= 2012 Negros Occidental's 5th congressional district special election =

- June 2, 2012

Negros Occidental's 5th congressional district
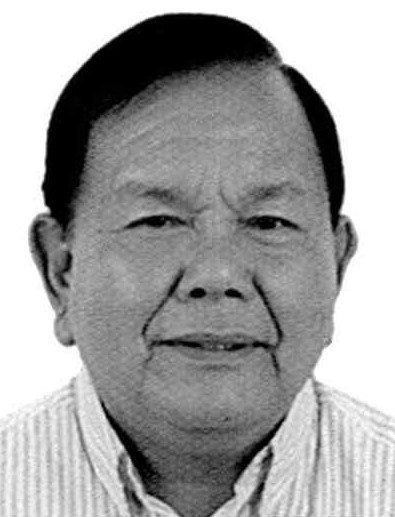

Candidate	Alejandro Mirasol	Dino Yulo
Party	Liberal	Nacionalista
Popular vote	81,982	68,879
Percentage	54.34	45.66
Representative before election
Iggy Arroyo
Lakas–Kampi
Representative-elect
Alejandro Mirasol
Liberal

A special election (known elsewhere as "by-elections") for Negros Occidental's 5th district seat in the House of Representatives of the Philippines was on June 2, 2012. The special election was called after incumbent representative Iggy Arroyo died on January 26, 2012. Binalbagan Mayor Alejandro Mirasol defeated Negros Occidental Provincial Board Member Dino Yulo in the election and served out the remainder of Arroyo's unfinished term during the 15th Congress that expired on June 30, 2013.

== Electoral system ==
The House of Representatives is elected via parallel voting system, with 80% of seats elected from congressional districts, and 20% from the party-list system. Each district sends one representative to the House of Representatives. An election to the seat is via first-past-the-post, in which the candidate with the most votes, whether or not one has a majority, wins the seat.

Based on Republic Act (RA) No. 6645, in order for a special election to take place, the seat must be vacated, the relevant chamber notifies the Commission on Elections (COMELEC) the existence of a vacancy, then the COMELEC schedules the special election. There has been a dispute in the procedure as a subsequent law, RA No. 7166, supposedly amended the procedure, bypassing the need for official communication from the relevant chamber of the vacancy. The COMELEC has always waited on official communication from the relevant chamber before scheduling a special election.

Meanwhile, according to RA No. 8295, should only one candidate file to run in the special election, the COMELEC would declare that candidate as the winner and no longer hold the election.

== Background ==
Negros Occidental's 5th district consists of the city of Himamaylan and the municipalities of Binalbagan, Hinigaran, Isabela, La Castellana and Moises Padilla, all in the central portion of the province.

Iggy Arroyo, brother-in-law of Pampanga representative and former President Gloria Macapagal Arroyo, was in his third and final term as representative of Negros Occidental's 5th district when he died on January 26, 2012, in London.

A House resolution was filed declaring the seat vacant to pave the way for a special election, although Speaker Feliciano Belmonte, Jr. and Negros Occidental Commission on Elections supervisor Jessie Suarez expressed reservations since the 2013 elections were just more than a year away. Belmonte instead suggested of appointing a caretaker to attend to the projects in the district; representatives from the neighboring districts, Mercedes Alvarez (6th) and Jeffrey Ferrer (4th), expressed interest in serving as caretaker until a new representative has been elected. Negros Occidental Governor Alfredo Marañon also expressed reservations in continuing with the special election, while Negros Occidental Provincial Board Member Melvin Ibañez had expressed interest in contesting the seat if an election would be held.

On February 29, Belmonte, together with Negros Occidental representatives Alfredo Marañon III, Albee Benitez, Mercedes Alvarez and Julio Ledesma IV, filed a House resolution calling for a special election. On March 14, the House of Representatives passed the resolution approving the special election; the commission would have to schedule the date of the election. Possible candidates that were running include Arroyo's sister Marilou Arroyo-Lesaca (former representative of Ang Kasangga party-list), Binalbagan Mayor Alejandro Mirasol and Board Member Dino Yulo. The next night, the commission scheduled the special election on June 9. Benitez also announced that the United Negros Alliance (UNA), the province's dominant political party, would decide on who they nominate for the vacant seat, with Benitez adding that the ruling Liberal Party has yet to state its preference among local politicians.

Election lawyer Romulo Macalintal said that the commission would just waste money on the special election, saying that money could have been better spent on basic services in the district. The Parish Pastoral Council for Responsible Voting (PPCRV) described the decision of holding the special election as "highly unconscionable" and a "total waste", stating that four months after election day, the filing of candidacies for the 2013 election would have had begun.

The UNA meeting on March 24 ended in a stalemate as Mirasol and Yulo, his nephew, disagreed on how the nomination process would be conducted; Yulo wanted a ballot where the choice would be ticked, while Mirasol wanted a ballot where one has to write the name of the preferred nominee. There were also allegations of "grease money" distributed prior to the convention that led to Yulo calling off the convention.

On March 27, Arroyo-Lesaca announced that she would not contest the election, while UNA would meet anew to decide on who among Mirasol and Ibañez would be their nominee; Mirasol was the frontrunner after being perceived to be the candidate by the Benigno Aquino III's administration. Later that week, Ibañez withdrew from the contest in favor of Mirasol; the latter was later seen as UNA's presumptive nominee. If Mirasol was not nominated by UNA, Grace Ibuna, Arroyo's longtime partner, would run. Other prospective candidates include former board member Enrique Montilla, a nephew of Arroyo-Lesaca, and former Isabela mayor Renato Malabor.

On a resolution dated March 28, the commission set the election on June 2, with a budget of more than 21 million pesos.

In a UNA caucus in Bacolod that April, it was decided that Mirasol would be their nominee for the special election. The governor, vice governor, the five other representatives, and all mayors in the 5th district gave their support to Mirasol. Only Himamaylan Mayor Agustin Ernesto Bascon, who was not present at the caucus, did not support Mirasol, instead endorsing Yulo. Ibuna expressed joy in Mirasol's nomination and supported him. Benitez also recruited Mirasol, a member of the Nationalist People's Coalition (NPC) to the Liberal Party, although he said that the Liberals would support Mirasol even though he would not join them.

Yulo said that he would not withdraw from the election. This came as Yulo allegedly gave way to Arroyo in the 2010 election after being talked to by Mirasol. Yulo denied that Benitez was offering him to be included in 1DSWD's nominees in the 2013 party-list election to give way for Mirasol, and that he was not interested if ever he was offered. He admitted that while he won't match the financial resources of UNA and he only has the support of his cousin Mayor Bascon, he was not intimidated.

On April 20, Macalintal and fellow lawyer Antonio Carlos Bautista questioned the legality of the special election "because it will be held beyond the period as provided for by law." They argued that since Arroyo died on January 25, and that a special election "shall be called and held not earlier than 60 days nor longer than 90 days after the occurrence of the vacancy," the period of time when the election can be held was between March 25 and April 25.

Mirasol defected to the Liberal Party of President Aquino on May 5, along with his vice mayor and councilors, although he remained as a UNA member. As a result, Mirasol, who had previously been a Liberal in 1988 but joined the NPC after the Liberals disappeared from the province, got the endorsement of President Aquino. Former Las Piñas Representative Cynthia Villar, wife of Nacionalista party president and senator Manny Villar, announced they were supporting Yulo's candidacy.

=== District profile ===
The 5th congressional district in Negros Occidental.

The 5th district of Negros Occidental is located on its south-central portion, centered on Himamaylan. After defeating the incumbent Jose Apolinario Lozada in the 2004 elections, Iggy Arroyo, President Gloria Macapagal Arroyo's brother-in-law, held the district until his death in 2012.

== Candidates ==
1. Alejandro Mirasol (Liberal), mayor of Binalbagan
2. Dino Yulo (Nacionalista), Negros Occidental Provincial Board member from the 5th district

== Campaign ==
The two candidates submitted their certificates of candidacies on May 16; Yulo went to the provincial elections office in the morning accompanied by his family, including Himamaylan mayor Bascon, where they handed out lollipops, while Mirasol submitted his certificate on the afternoon with the UNA officials. The two filed leaves of absence from their posts until the election period was over. To counter Mirasol's logistical advantage, Yulo relied on his "lollipop campaign," where he distributed lollipops on the campaign trail, which had worked for him in previous elections.

Mirasol and Yulo signed a peace covenant pledging a peaceful election and denouncing the use of violence. The local government also promised that the police and military would be neutral in the election. On the eve of the election, both campaigns predicted victory; Governor Marañon hosted a rally at the Valeriano Gatuslao gym in Himamaylan for Mirasol, while Yulo ended the campaign on the road.

== Results ==
2012 Negros Occidental's 5th congressional district special election
Candidate	Party	Votes	%
Alejandro Mirasol	Liberal Party	81,982	54.34
Dino Yulo	Nacionalista Party	68,879	45.66
Total		150,861	100.00
Valid votes		150,861	99.51
Invalid/blank votes		750	0.49
Total votes		151,611	100.00
Registered voters/turnout			73.41
Majority		13,103	8.69
Liberal Party gain from Lakas Kampi CMD			

=== Per municipality ===
Municipality	Mirasol	Yulo	Percent of valid votes
Binalbagan	18,821 / 3,666		14.91%
Himamaylan	15,125 / 21,916		24.55%
Hinigaran	15,250 / 15,435		20.34%
Isabela	10,853 / 10,553		14.19%
La Castellana	14,070 / 10,104		16.02%
Moises Padilla	7,863 / 7,205		9.99%
5th district of Negros Occidental	81,982 / 68,879		100%

The provincial board of canvassers declared Mirasol as the winner at 6:45 a.m. of June 3 at the Provincial Capitol in Bacolod. Commission on Elections chairman Sixto Brillantes, who had supervised the election, said that the election "was very peaceful, quiet and orderly. The weather did not cooperate but we still had a very good voters turnout at 73.41 percent." Mirasol won in Binalbagan, Isabela and La Castellana.

== Aftermath ==
Mirasol again defeated Yulo in the 2013 general election, and in 2016. In 2019, Marilou Arroyo-Lesaca sought the district's seat. Because of this, Mirasol said that he would run as mayor of Binalbagan again, and endorsed Arroyo-Lesaca instead of running against her. She was elected unopposed. Arroyo-Lesaca was then defeated in 2022 by Yulo, who finally clinched the seat. Yulo defended the seat in 2025. Mirasol, who had then become mayor of Binalbagan since 2019, was defeated in 2025.

== 2010 election result ==
2010 Philippine House of Representatives election at Negros Occidental's 5th district
Candidate	Party	Votes	%
Iggy Arroyo	Lakas Kampi CMD	117,894	87.43
Rodolfo Magalona	Independent	16,945	12.57
Total		134,839	100.00
Valid votes		134,839	78.96
Invalid/blank votes		35,932	21.04
Total votes		170,771	100.00
Majority		100,949	74.87
Lakas Kampi CMD hold			
