= Negros Occidental Provincial Board =

Legislative body of the province of Negros Occidental, Philippines

Negros Occidental Provincial Board Sangguniang Panlalawigan ng Negros Occidental Sanggunian nga Pangkapuoran sang Negros Nakatundan Sangguniang Panlalawigan sa Kasadpang Negros
- 10th Negros Occidental Provincial Board

Type
- Type: Unicameral
- Term limits: 3 terms (9 years)

Leadership
- Presiding Officer: Jose Benito A. Alonso, NUP

Structure
- Seats: 15 board members 1 ex officio presiding officer
- Political groups: NUP (4) NPC (3) UNEGA (2) PFP (2) TBD (1) Nonpartisan (2)
- Length of term: 3 years
- Authority: Local Government Code of the Philippines

Elections
- Voting system: Multiple non-transferable vote (regular members); Indirect election (ex officio members)
- Last election: May 12, 2025
- Next election: May 15, 2028

Meeting place
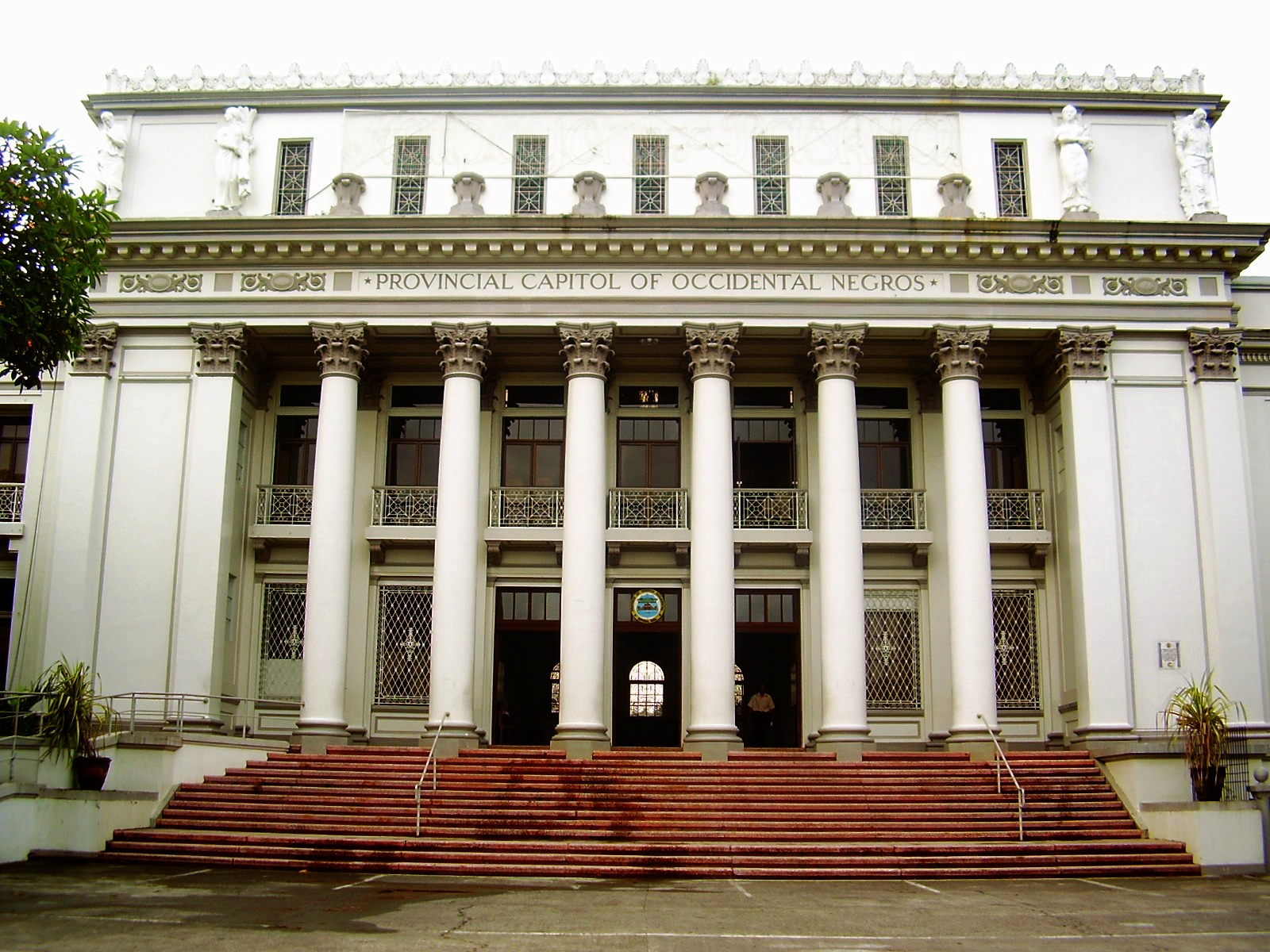
- Negros Occidental Provincial Capitol, Bacolod

The Negros Occidental Provincial Board is the Sangguniang Panlalawigan (provincial legislature) of the Philippine province of Negros Occidental.

The members are elected via six provincial board districts, coextensive with the legislative districts of Negros Occidental, each sending two members to the provincial board; the electorate votes for two members, with the two candidates with the highest number of votes being elected. The Vice Governor of Negros Occidental is the ex officio presiding officer, elected with the Governor. As ex officio presiding officer, he only votes to break ties.

== List of members ==
An additional three ex officio members are the presidents of the provincial chapters of the Association of Barangay Captains, the Councilors' League, the Sangguniang Kabataan provincial president; the municipal and city (if applicable) presidents of the Association of Barangay Captains, Councilor's League and Sangguniang Kabataan, shall elect amongst themselves their provincial presidents which shall be their representatives at the board.

=== Current members ===
These are the members after the 2025 local elections and 2023 barangay and SK elections:

- Vice Governor: Jose Benito A. Alfonso (NUP)

Seat	Board member	Party	Start of term	End of term
1st district	Laurence Marxlen J. dela Cruz	NUP	June 30, 2025	June 30, 2028
1st district	Araceli T. Somosa	NPC	June 30, 2019	June 30, 2028
2nd district	Arthur Christopher D. Marañon	NUP	June 30, 2025	June 30, 2028
2nd district	Sixto V. Guanzon Jr.	UNEGA	June 30, 2019	June 30, 2028
3rd district	Andrew Gerard L. Montelibano	PFP	June 30, 2019	June 30, 2028
3rd district	Hope Marey D. Sazon	PFP	June 30, 2025	June 30, 2028
4th district	Patricia Paula A. Valderama	NUP	June 30, 2025	June 30, 2028
4th district	Nicholas M. Yulo	NUP	June 30, 2025	June 30, 2028
5th district	Hadji P. Trojillo	Nacionalista	June 30, 2025	June 30, 2028
5th district	Rita Angela S. Gatuslao	UNEGA	June 30, 2019	June 30, 2028
6th district	Genaro G. Alvarez IV	NPC	June 30, 2025	June 30, 2028
6th district	Jeffrey T. Tubola	NPC	June 30, 2019	June 30, 2028
ABC	Juvy A. Pepello	Nonpartisan	July 30, 2018	January 1, 2023
PCL				June 30, 2028
SK	Mayvelyn L. Madrid	Nonpartisan		

== Past members ==
=== Vice governor ===
Election year	Name	Party	Ref.
2016	Bong Lacson	NPC	
2019	Jeffrey Ferrer	NUP	
2022	Jeffrey Ferrer	NUP	
2025	Jose Benito A. Alonso	NUP	

=== 1st district board members ===
- City: Escalante, San Carlos City
- Municipalities: Calatrava, Salvador Benedicto, Toboso
- Population (2015): 375,006

Election year	Member (party)	Member (party)	Ref.
2016	Rommel T. Debulgado (NPC)	Antonio T. Encarguez, Sr. (NPC)	
2019	Rommel T. Debulgado (NPC)	Araceli T. Somosa (NPC)	
2022	Rommel T. Debulgado (NPC)	Araceli T. Somosa (NPC)	
2025	Laurence Marxlen J. dela Cruz (NUP)	Araceli T. Somosa (NPC)	

=== 2nd district board members ===
- City: Cadiz, Sagay City
- Municipality: Manapla
- Population (2015): 355,832

Election year	Member (party)	Member (party)	Ref.
2016	Salvador G. Escalante, Jr. (Liberal)	Samson C. Mirhan (Liberal)	
2019	Samson C. Mirhan (UNEGA)	Sixto Teofilo Roxas V. Guanzon Jr. (UNEGA)	
2022	Sixto V. Guanzon Jr. (UNEGA)	Samson C. Mirhan (NUP)	
2025	Arthur Christopher D. Marañon (NUP)	Sixto V. Guanzon Jr. (UNEGA)	

=== 3rd district board members ===
- City: Silay City, Talisay City, Victorias City
- Municipalities: Enrique B. Magalona, Murcia
- Population (2015): 461,284

Election year	Member (party)	Member (party)	Ref.
2016	Manuel Frederick O. Ko (NPC)	David Albert R. Lacson (NUP)	
2019	Manuel Frederick O. Ko (NPC)	Andrew Gerard L. Montelibano (PDP–Laban)	
2022	Manuel Frederick O. Ko (NPC)	Andrew Gerard L. Montelibano (PDP–Laban)	
2025	Andrew Gerard L. Montelibano (PFP)	Hope Marey D. Sazon (PFP)	

=== 4th district board members ===
- City: Bago, La Carlota City
- Municipalities: Pontevedra, Pulupandan, San Enrique, Valladolid
- Population (2015): 376,791

Election year	Member (party)	Member (party)	Ref.
2016	Jose Benito A. Alonso (NUP)	Victor B. Javellana (NPC)	
2019	Jose Benito A. Alonso (NUP)	Victor B. Javellana (NPC)	
2022	Jose Benito A. Alonso (NUP)	Andrew Martin Y. Torres (NPC)	
2025	Patricia Paula A. Valderama (NUP)	Nicholas M. Yulo (NUP)	

=== 5th district board members ===
- City: Himamaylan City
- Municipalities: Binalbagan, Hinigaran, Isabela, La Castellana, Moises Padilla
- Population (2015): 438,139

Election year	Member (party)	Member (party)	Ref.
2016	Renato M. Malabor, Jr. (NUP)	Alain S. Gatuslao (Liberal)	
2019	Agustin Ernesto G. Bascon (NPC)	Rita Angela S. Gatuslao (UNEGA)	
2022	Rita Angela S. Gatuslao (UNEGA)	Anthony Dennis J. Occeño (Independent)	
2025	Hadji P. Trojillo (Nacionalista)	Rita Angela S. Gatuslao (UNEGA)	

=== 6th district board members ===
- City: Kabankalan City, Sipalay City
- Municipalities: Candoni, Cauayan, Hinoba-an, Ilog
- Population (2015): 490,209

Election year	Member (party)	Member (party)	Ref.
2016	Pedro P. Zayco, Jr. (NPC)	Helen Z. Zafra (NPC)	
2019	Valentino Miguel J. Alonso (NPC)	Jeffrey T. Tubola (NPC)	
2022	Valentino Miguel J. Alonso (NPC)	Jeffrey T. Tubola (NPC)	
2025	Genaro G. Alvarez IV (NPC)	Jeffrey T. Tubola (NPC)	

=== Philippine Councilors League President ===
These are members representing a group of elected councilors from the twelve City Councils and nineteen Municipal Councils of Negros Occidental.

Election year	Member (party)	Local council	Ref.
2019	Ryan Milos Romeo M. Gamboa (PDP-Laban)	Silay	

=== Liga ng mga Barangay President ===
These are members representing a group of elected barangay chairpersons from 31 ABC councils of Negros Occidental.

Election year	Member	Municipality/City	Ref.
2018	Juvy A. Pepello	Victorias	

=== Sangguniang Kabataan Federation President ===
These are members representing a group of elected SK chairpersons from 31 SK Federation councils of Negros Occidental.

Election year	Member	Municipality/City	Ref.
2018	Pocholo C. Yuvienco	San Carlos	
2025	Mayvelyn L. Madrid	San Carlos	
