= Alejandro Mirasol =

Filipino politician

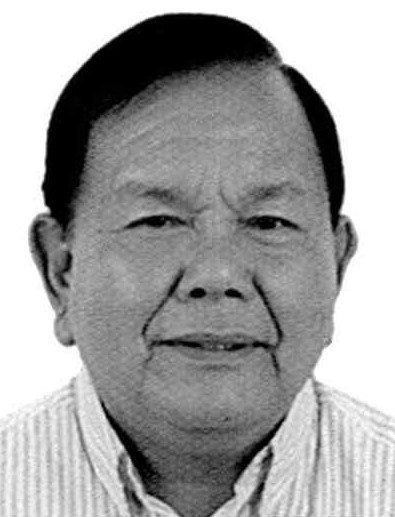
- Mirasol certificate of candidacy photo in 2024

Mayor of Binalbagan
- In office June 30, 2019 – June 30, 2025
- Vice Mayor: Sammuel Gavaran (2019–2022); Mary Ann Mirasol (2022–2025)
- Preceded by: Emmanuel Aranda
- Succeeded by: Emmanuel Aranda
- In office June 30, 2007 – June 4, 2012
- Vice Mayor: Emmanuel Aranda
- Preceded by: Emmanuel Aranda
- Succeeded by: Emmanuel Aranda

Member of the Philippine House of Representatives from Negros Occidental's 5th congressional district
- In office June 4, 2012 – June 30, 2019
- Preceded by: Iggy Arroyo
- Succeeded by: Marilou Arroyo-Lesaca

Personal details
- Born: Alejandro Yulo Mirasol
- Party: PFP (2024–present)
- Other political affiliations: PDP–Laban (2021–2024); Lakas (2018–2021); Liberal (2012–2018); UNEGA (2009–2012); NPC (2007–2009)
- Spouse: Mary Ann Mirasol

Alejandro "Bebot" Yulo Mirasol is a Filipino politician who was a member of the House of Representatives. He represented Negros Occidental's 5th congressional district from 2012 to 2019. In 2022, he ran for mayor of Binalbagan with his wife Mary Ann Mirasol as running mate.

== See also ==
- 15th Congress of the Philippines
- 16th Congress of the Philippines
- 17th Congress of the Philippines
