= Isabela, Negros Occidental =

Municipality in Negros Occidental, Philippines

Isabela
- Municipality
- Municipality of Isabela
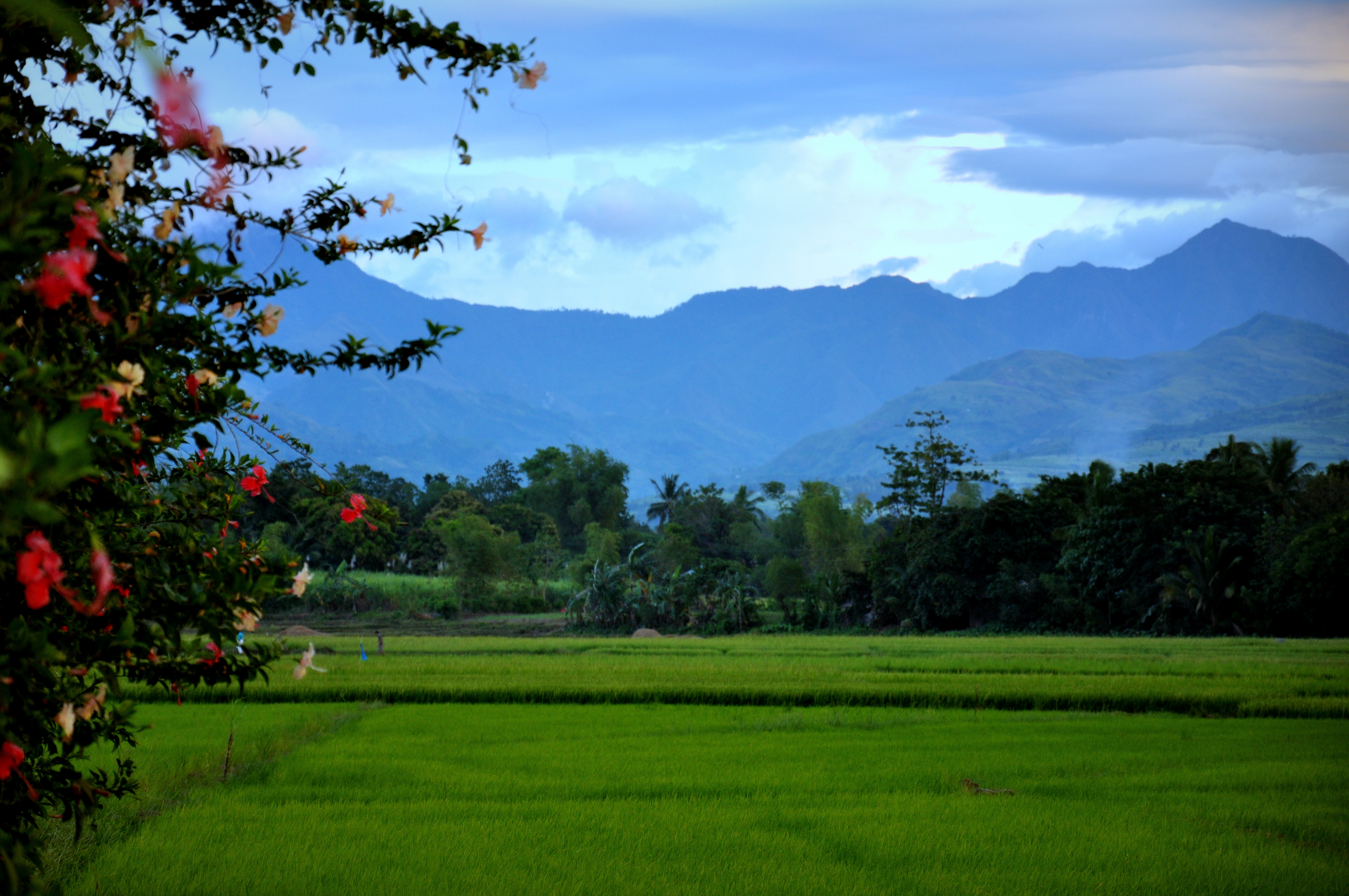
- Barangay Camangcamang with Mabinay Mountains seen in the distance

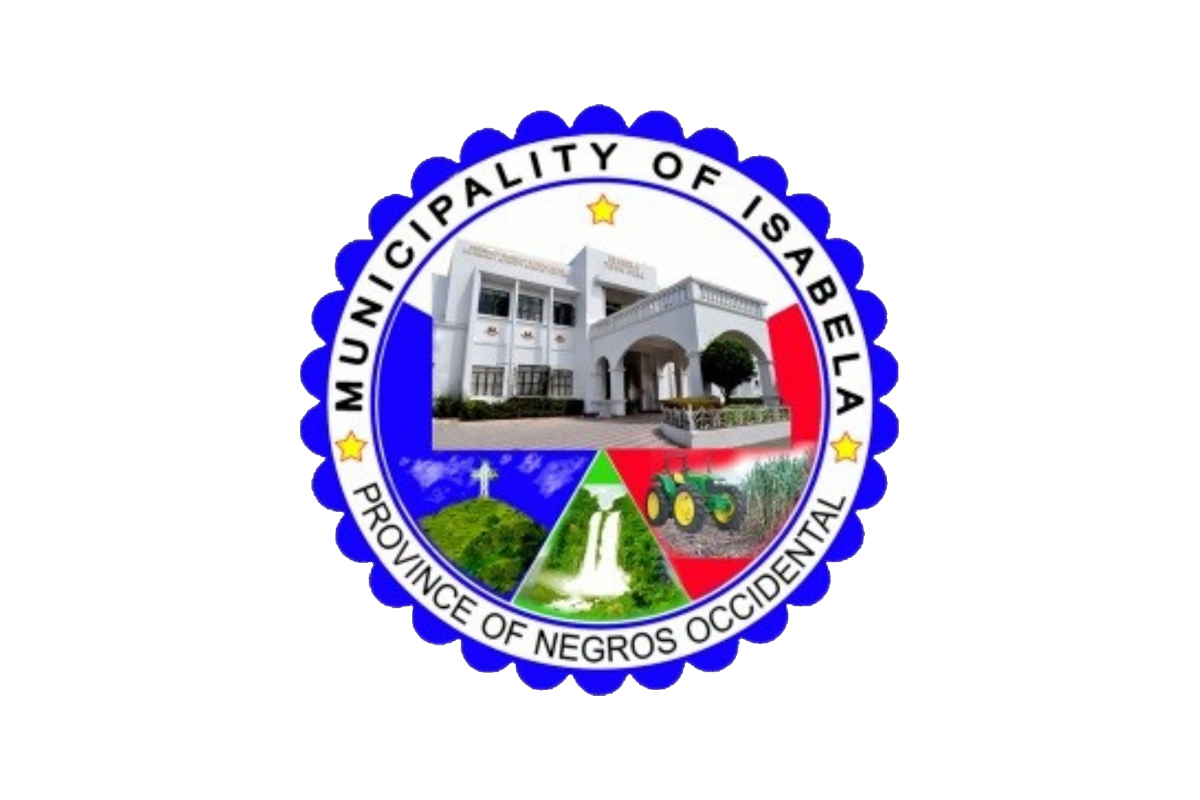
- Flag
- Nickname: The Sweet Heart of Negros
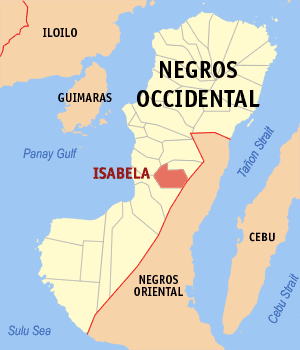
- Map of Negros Occidental with Isabela highlighted
- Interactive map of Isabela
- Location within the Philippines
- Coordinates: 10°12′N 122°59′E
- Country: Philippines
- Region: Negros Island Region
- Province: Negros Occidental
- District: 5th district
- Named for: Isabella II of Spain
- Barangays: 30 (see Barangays)

Government
  - Type: Sangguniang Bayan
  - Mayor: Miguel Angelo G. Yulo (Lakas)
  - Vice Mayor: Renato M. Malabor, Jr. (Lakas)
  - Representative: Emilio Bernardino L. Yulo III (Lakas)
  - Municipal Council: Members: Nico Adrian K. Vasquez; Ryan G. Uy; Francis Y. Malabor; Arjay D. Ansag; Wilfredo D. Flores; Dadilos T. Española, Jr.; Randy T. Candelario; Eduardo T. Española; Alyssa Therese T. Celo ^{◌}; ◌ ex officio SK chairman
  - Electorate: 42,760 voters (2025)

Area
  - Total: 178.76 km^{2} (69.02 sq mi)
- Elevation: 52 m (171 ft)
- Highest elevation: 651 m (2,136 ft)
- Lowest elevation: 12 m (39 ft)

Population (2024 census)
  - Total: 65,399
  - Density: 365.85/km^{2} (947.54/sq mi)
  - Households: 15,685

Economy
  - Income class: 1st municipal income class
  - Poverty incidence: 26.99% (2023)
  - Revenue: ₱ 273.5 million (2024)
  - Assets: ₱ 520.8 million (2024)
  - Expenditure: ₱ 268.6 million (2024)
  - Liabilities: ₱ 78.13 million (2024)

Service provider
  - Electricity: Negros Occidental Electric Cooperative (NOCECO)
- Time zone: UTC+8 (PST)
- ZIP code: 6128
- PSGC: 064514000
- IDD : area code: +63 (0)34
- Native languages: Hiligaynon; Ati; Tagalog
- Website: www.isabela.gov.ph

Isabela, officially the Municipality of Isabela, is a municipality in the province of Negros Occidental, Philippines. According to the 2024 census, it has a population of 65,399 people.

== History ==
In 1951, the barrios of Magallon, Odiong, and Guinpanaan were separated from Isabela and formed into the town of Magallon (now Moises Padilla).

== Geography ==
Isabela is 80 kilometres (50 mi) from Bacolod (via La Castellana) or 71 kilometres (44 mi) (via Hinigaran), 35 kilometres (22 mi) from Guihulngan, 14 kilometres (8.7 mi) from Binalbagan, and 19 kilometres (12 mi) from Hinigaran.

=== Barangays ===
Isabela is politically subdivided into 30 barangays, namely:

- Amin
- Banogbanog
- Bulad
- Bungahin
- Cabcab
- Camangcamang
- Camp Clark
- Cansalongon
- Guintubhan
- Libas
- Limalima
- Makilignit
- Mansablay
- Maytubig
- Panaquiao
- Barangay 1 (Poblacion)
- Barangay 2 (Poblacion)
- Barangay 3 (Poblacion)
- Barangay 4 (Poblacion)
- Barangay 5 (Poblacion)
- Barangay 6 (Poblacion)
- Barangay 7 (Poblacion)
- Barangay 8 (Poblacion)
- Barangay 9 (Poblacion)
- Riverside
- Rumirang
- San Agustin
- Sebucawan
- Sikatuna
- Tinongan

Each barangay consists of puroks and some have sitios.

=== Climate ===
Climate data for Isabela, Negros Occidental
Month	Jan	Feb	Mar	Apr	May	Jun	Jul	Aug	Sep	Oct	Nov	Dec	Year
Mean daily maximum °C (°F)	30 (86)	31 (88)	32 (90)	33 (91)	32 (90)	30 (86)	29 (84)	29 (84)	29 (84)	29 (84)	30 (86)	30 (86)	30 (87)
Mean daily minimum °C (°F)	22 (72)	22 (72)	22 (72)	24 (75)	25 (77)	25 (77)	25 (77)	24 (75)	24 (75)	24 (75)	23 (73)	23 (73)	24 (74)
Average precipitation mm (inches)	38 (1.5)	29 (1.1)	55 (2.2)	65 (2.6)	141 (5.6)	210 (8.3)	212 (8.3)	176 (6.9)	180 (7.1)	180 (7.1)	130 (5.1)	70 (2.8)	1,486 (58.6)
Average rainy days	9.0	7.2	11.1	13.5	25.6	28.4	28.9	27.3	26.9	27.7	21.8	13.8	241.2
Source: Meteoblue (modeled/calculated data, not measured locally)

== Demographics ==
Population census of Isabela

Year	Pop.	±% p.a.
1903	12,836	—
1918	19,653	+2.88%
1939	43,509	+3.86%
1948	33,743	−2.78%
1960	29,769	−1.04%
1970	33,636	+1.23%
1975	37,400	+2.15%
1980	39,704	+1.20%

Year	Pop.	±% p.a.
1990	47,010	+1.70%
1995	49,019	+0.79%
2000	48,719	−0.13%
2007	58,819	+2.63%
2010	59,523	+0.43%
2015	62,146	+0.82%
2020	64,516	+0.79%
2024	65,399	+0.33%

Source: Philippine Statistics Authority

== Economy ==
Poverty incidence of Isabela (%)

Source: Philippine Statistics Authority

Panublion Festival, started during the time of Mayor Irene C. Montilla. Gained national awareness because of the high level talent mayor and Vice Mayor Montilla brought in, culminating in Moira Dela Torre coming to Isabela. These were heights rare to be seen in a municipality as small as Isabela but history was made under their leadership.

== Notable personalities ==
- Lt. Cesar Basa, World War II pilot and hero. First Filipino aviator killed during aerial combat.
- Allan K., actor-comedian/TV host/entrepreneur
