= Paolo Tantoco =

Filipino businessman (1981–2025)

Juan Paolo Tantoco
- Born: January 6, 1981
- Died: March 8, 2025 (aged 44); Los Angeles County, United States
- Citizenship: Philippines; United States
- Occupation: Businessman
- Known for: Executive at Rustan's Group of Companies including head of administration at Rustan's Department Store, and COO of Pacific Links Golf Development Inc. and chief security and procurement officer of Sta. Elena Golf and Country Estate.
- Spouse: Dina Arroyo (m. 2006)
- Parents: Bienvenido (Rico) Tantoco II (father); Marina (Nena) Vargas (mother)
- Relatives: Iggy Arroyo (father-in-law)

Juan Paolo "Paowee" Tantoco (January 6, 1981–March 8, 2025) was a Filipino businessman who was administrator of the department store chain Rustan's.

== Early life and education ==
Paolo Tantoco was born on January 6, 1981 to Nena (nee Vargas) and Bienvenido "Rico" Tantoco Jr. He is sixth among a family of seven children. He is a grandson of Rustan's founders Bienvenido Tantoco and Gliceria Rustia Tantoco.

Tantoco attended the International School Manila during middle school where he first met his future wife. He parted ways with his classmate and went to the United States to study at the Bentley College in Boston to pursue a degree in business administration.

He earned a master's degree in business at the Asian Institute of Management in 2017.

== Career ==
Paolo Tantoco was assistant vice president of Rustan Commercial Corporation which was started by his grandparents. Tantoco was also chief operating officer of Pacific Links Golf Development and chief security and procurement officer of Sta. Elena Golf and Country Estate at the time of his death.

== Death ==
Tantoco was found dead at the Beverly Hilton Hotel in Los Angeles County in the United States and was formally declared dead March 8, 2025.

The Los Angeles Coroner’s Office declared his official cause of death to be a drug overdose from the use of cocaine.

His death was also claimed without concrete evidence to be a diversion tactic from the arrest of Rodrigo Duterte in March 11 for the International Criminal Court. Misinformation regarding First Lady Liza Araneta Marcos' detention in Los Angeles was also spread connecting Tantoco's death.

== Personal life ==
Tantoco was married to Dina Arroyo, daughter of Ignacio Arroyo. They had three children. Classmates back in middle school at International School Manila, Tantoco reunited with Arroyo in 2004 and started dating. He entered in a civil union with Arroyo in 2006 in Los Angeles when both of them were residing in Boston. The two married in the Philippines on September 17, 2006 at the Santa Elena Golf Club in Santa Rosa, Laguna.
