= Marilou Arroyo-Lesaca =

Filipino politician

Member of the Philippine House of Representatives from Negros Occidental's 5th congressional district
- In office June 30, 2019 – June 30, 2022
- Preceded by: Alejandro Y. Mirasol
- Succeeded by: Dino Yulo

Personal details
- Party: Lakas (2018–present); UNEGA (local party; 2018–present)
- Relations: Ignacio Tuason Arroyo Jr. (brother); Jose Miguel Tuason Arroyo (brother)

Maria Lourdes Tuason Arroyo-Lesaca is a Filipino politician who was a member of the House of Representatives for Negros Occidental's 5th congressional district.

== Political career ==
She was elected as a representative of Negros Occidental's 5th congressional district at the House of Representatives in the 2019 House of Representatives elections.

== Family ==
She is the daughter of Ignacio Lacson Arroyo, Sr. and Lourdes Zaragoza Tuason. She is the wife of the violinist John Lesaca. She is the sister-in-law of Former President and now Representative Gloria Macapagal-Arroyo. Her brother, Iggy Arroyo, was the district’s congressman from 2004 until his death in 2012.

== See also ==
- List of female members of the House of Representatives of the Philippines
- 18th Congress of the Philippines
