= Negros Occidental's 5th congressional district =

Legislative district of the Philippines

- Constituency for the House of Representatives of the Philippines
- Boundary of Negros Occidental's 5th congressional district in Negros Occidental
- Location of Negros Occidental within the Philippines
- Province: Negros Occidental
- Region: Negros Island Region
- Population: 464,026 (2020)
- Electorate: 291,349 (2022)
- Major settlements: 6 LGUs: Cities; Himamaylan; Municipalities; Binalbagan; Hinigaran; Isabela; La Castellana; Moises Padilla
- Area: 1,220.00 km^{2} (471.04 sq mi)

Current constituency
- Created: 1987
- Representative: Dino Yulo
- Political party: Lakas–CMD
- Congressional bloc: Majority

Negros Occidental's 5th congressional district is one of the six congressional districts of the Philippines in the province of Negros Occidental. It has been represented in the House of Representatives since 1987. The district consists of the area in south-central Negros Occidental containing the city of Himamaylan and adjacent municipalities of Binalbagan, Hinigaran, Isabela, La Castellana and Moises Padilla. It is currently represented in the 20th Congress by Dino Yulo of the Lakas–CMD.

== Representation history ==
#	Image	Member	Term of office		Congress	Party	Electoral history	Constituent LGUs
#	Image	Member	Start	End	Congress	Party	Electoral history	Constituent LGUs
=== Negros Occidental's 5th district for the House of Representatives of the Philippines ===
District created February 2, 1987. Redistricted from Negros Occidental's at-large district.
1		Mariano M. Yulo	June 30, 1987	June 30, 1998	8th	Independent	Elected in 1987.	1987–present Binalbagan, Himamaylan, Hinigaran, Isabela, La Castellana, Moises Padilla
1		Mariano M. Yulo	June 30, 1987	June 30, 1998	9th	NPC	Re-elected in 1992.	1987–present Binalbagan, Himamaylan, Hinigaran, Isabela, La Castellana, Moises Padilla
1		Mariano M. Yulo	June 30, 1987	June 30, 1998	10th	NPC	Re-elected in 1995.	1987–present Binalbagan, Himamaylan, Hinigaran, Isabela, La Castellana, Moises Padilla
2		Jose Apolinario Lozada	June 30, 1998	June 30, 2004	11th	Lakas	Elected in 1998.	1987–present Binalbagan, Himamaylan, Hinigaran, Isabela, La Castellana, Moises Padilla
2		Jose Apolinario Lozada	June 30, 1998	June 30, 2004	12th	Lakas	Re-elected in 2001.	1987–present Binalbagan, Himamaylan, Hinigaran, Isabela, La Castellana, Moises Padilla
3		Iggy Arroyo	June 30, 2004	January 26, 2012	13th	KAMPI	Elected in 2004.	1987–present Binalbagan, Himamaylan, Hinigaran, Isabela, La Castellana, Moises Padilla
3		Iggy Arroyo	June 30, 2004	January 26, 2012	14th	Lakas	Re-elected in 2007.	1987–present Binalbagan, Himamaylan, Hinigaran, Isabela, La Castellana, Moises Padilla
3		Iggy Arroyo	June 30, 2004	January 26, 2012	15th	Lakas	Re-elected in 2010. Died in office.	1987–present Binalbagan, Himamaylan, Hinigaran, Isabela, La Castellana, Moises Padilla
4		Alejandro Y. Mirasol	June 4, 2012	June 30, 2019	15th	Liberal	Elected in 2012 to finish Arroyo's term.	1987–present Binalbagan, Himamaylan, Hinigaran, Isabela, La Castellana, Moises Padilla
4		Alejandro Y. Mirasol	June 4, 2012	June 30, 2019	16th	Liberal	Re-elected in 2013.	1987–present Binalbagan, Himamaylan, Hinigaran, Isabela, La Castellana, Moises Padilla
4		Alejandro Y. Mirasol	June 4, 2012	June 30, 2019	17th	Lakas	Re-elected in 2016.	1987–present Binalbagan, Himamaylan, Hinigaran, Isabela, La Castellana, Moises Padilla
5		Ma. Lourdes T. Arroyo-Lesaca	June 30, 2019	June 30, 2022	18th	Lakas	Elected in 2019.	1987–present Binalbagan, Himamaylan, Hinigaran, Isabela, La Castellana, Moises Padilla
6		Emilio Bernardino L. Yulo III	June 30, 2022	Incumbent	19th	Lakas	Elected in 2022.	1987–present Binalbagan, Himamaylan, Hinigaran, Isabela, La Castellana, Moises Padilla
6		Emilio Bernardino L. Yulo III	June 30, 2022	Incumbent	20th	Lakas	Re-elected in 2025.	1987–present Binalbagan, Himamaylan, Hinigaran, Isabela, La Castellana, Moises Padilla

== Election results ==
=== 2025 ===
2025 Philippine House of Representatives election in the First District of Negros Occidental
Candidate	Party	Votes	%
Dino Yulo	Lakas–CMD	201,003	84.67
Anton Occeno	Partido Federal ng Pilipinas	36,406	15.33
Total		237,409	100.00
Lakas–CMD hold			
Source: Commission on Elections

=== 2022 ===
2022 Philippine House of Representatives elections
Party	Candidate	Votes	%
Independent	Emilio Bernardino "Dino" Yulo III	118,558	60.9
Lakas	Marilou Arroyo-Lesaca (incumbent)	76,115	39.1
Total votes		194,673	100.00
Independent gain from Lakas			

=== 2019 ===
2019 Philippine House of Representatives elections
Party	Candidate	Votes	%
Lakas	Marilou Arroyo-Lesaca	105,227	
Total votes			
Lakas hold			

=== 2016 ===
2016 Philippine House of Representatives elections
Party	Candidate	Votes	%
Liberal	Alejandro Y. Mirasol	88,897	50.93%
Nacionalista	Emilio Yulo III	85,638	49.06%
Invalid or blank votes		29,260	
Total votes		203,795	100.00%

=== 2013 ===
2013 Philippine House of Representatives elections
Party	Candidate	Votes	%
Liberal	Alejandro Y. Mirasol	73,184	45.72
Nacionalista	Emilio Yulo III	70,161	43.83
Margin of victory		3,023	1.89%
Invalid or blank votes		16,726	10.45
Total votes		160,071	100.00
Liberal hold			

=== 2012 special ===
2012 Negros Occidental's 5th congressional district special election
Candidate	Party	Votes	%
Alejandro Y. Mirasol	Liberal Party	81,982	54.34
Emilio Yulo III	Nacionalista Party	68,879	45.66
Total		150,861	100.00
Valid votes		150,861	99.51
Invalid/blank votes		750	0.49
Total votes		151,611	100.00
Registered voters/turnout			73.41
Majority		13,103	8.69
Liberal Party gain from Lakas Kampi CMD			

=== 2010 ===
Candidate	Party	Votes	%
Iggy Arroyo (incumbent)	Lakas–Kampi–CMD	117,894	87.43
Rodolfo Magalona	Independent	16,945	12.57
Total		134,839	100.00
Valid votes		134,839	78.96
Invalid/blank votes		35,932	21.04
Total votes		170,771	100.00
Lakas–Kampi–CMD hold			
Source: Commission on Elections

== See also ==
- Legislative districts of Negros Occidental
