= Ryan Sermona =

Filipino boxer

Personal information
- Nickname: The Crusher
- Nationality: (Philippines) Filipino
- Born: Ryan Pabillo Sermona; October 31, 1987 (age 38) Himamaylan City, Negros Occidental, Philippines
- Height: 5 ft 4 in (1.63 m)
- Weight: Featherweight; Super Featherweight

Boxing career
- Stance: Southpaw

Boxing record
- Total fights: 33
- Wins: 21
- Win by KO: 14
- Losses: 11
- Draws: 1
- No contests: 0

Ryan Pabillo Sermona (born October 31, 1987) is a Filipino boxer. He is a former WBC International Super Featherweight champion.

== Professional career ==
On December 6, 2013, Sermona won the WBC International Super Featherweight title by defeating Matt Garlett by fourth-round knockout.

On August 16, 2014, Sermona defended the WBC International Super Featherweight title against Corey McConnell, but lost by seventh-round technical knockout.

== Professional boxing record ==
17 Wins (10 knockouts, 7 decisions), 7 Losses, 0 Draws
Res.	Record	Opponent	Type	Round, Time	Date	Location	Notes
Win	17–7	(Philippines) Gilbert Donasales	RTD	3 (6), 3:00	2015-04-25	(Philippines) The Flash Grand Ballroom of the Elorde Sports Complex, Parañaque, Metro Manila	
Loss	16–7	(Japan) Masayuki Ito	TKO	1 (8), 2:10	2014-11-25	(Japan) Korakuen Hall, Tokyo	
Loss	16–6	(Australia) Corey McConnell	TKO	7 (12), 0:57	2014-08-09	(Australia) Crossing Theatre, Narrabri, New South Wales	Lost WBC International Super Featherweight title.
Loss	16–5	(Japan) Shingo Eto	TD	6 (8), 2:28	2014-04-14	(Japan) Korakuen Hall, Tokyo	
Win	16–4	(Australia) Matt Garlett	KO	4 (12), 2:25	2013-12-06	Metro City, Northbridge, Western Australia	Won WBC International Super Featherweight title.
Win	15–4	(Philippines) Balweg Bangoyan	TD	5 (10), 3:00	2013-03-16	(Philippines) PAGCOR Grand Theater, Parañaque, Metro Manila	Won vacant Philippines Games & Amusement Board Super Featherweight title.
Loss	14–4	(Romania) Viorel Simion	TKO	4 (12)	2012-11-29	(Romania) Sala Sporturilor, Craiova	For WBC International Featherweight title.
Win	14–3	(Philippines) Joan de Guia	KO	3 (10), 2:58	2012-07-14	(Philippines) The Flash Grand Ballroom of the Elorde Sports Complex, Parañaque, Metro Manila	
Win	13–3	(Philippines) Roberto Gonzales	KO	5 (10), 1:28	2012-05-13	(Philippines) Puerto Galera Gym, Puerto Galera, Oriental Mindoro	Won IBF Pan Pacific Youth Super Featherweight title.
Win	12–3	(Thailand) Ratchata Twinswingym	TKO	2 (10), 1:28	2011-12-03	(Philippines) IIocos Norte Centennial Arena, Laoag City, Ilocos Norte	
Win	11–3	(Philippines) Vic Racuma	TD	5 (10), 2:26	2011-08-13	(Philippines) Elorde Sports Center, Parañaque, Metro Manila	
Loss	10–3	(South Korea) Nam-Joon Lee	MD	8	2011-04-29	(South Korea) Chungeui Temple, Yesan-gun	
Win	10–2	(Philippines) Dave Day Galas	RTD	1 (4), 3:00	2010-08-01	(Philippines) PAGCOR Hotel and Casino, Bacolod, Negros Occidental	
Win	9–2	(Philippines) Rolando Omela	TKO	5 (6), 1:12	2010-05-29	(Philippines) PAGCOR Hotel and Casino, Bacolod, Negros Occidental	
Win	8–2	(Philippines) Reggie Binueza	KO	6 (8), 1:38	2010-04-21	(Philippines) Agustin Gatuslao Memorial Gym, Himamaylan City, Negros Occidental	
Win	7–2	(Philippines) Jomar Labiogo	UD	4	2010-02-21	(Philippines) PAGCOR Hotel and Casino, Bacolod, Negros Occidental	
Win	6–2	(Philippines) Mervin Batolina	KO	1 (8), 1:26	2009-10-24	(Philippines) Elorde Sports Center, Parañaque, Metro Manila	
Loss	5–2	(Philippines) Ronnel Esparas	UD	8	2009-06-27	(Philippines) Elorde Sports Center, Parañaque, Metro Manila	
Win	5–1	(Philippines) Ruel Cuizon	SD	8	2009-03-28	(Philippines) Polytechnic State College of Antique, Sibalom, Antique	
Loss	4–1	(Philippines) Jose Ocampo	TKO	6 (8), 2:53	2008-12-20	(Philippines) Elorde Sports Center, Parañaque, Metro Manila	
Win	4–0	(Philippines) Jeffrey Torio	KO	4 (6), 0:54	2008-10-25	(Philippines) Tambo Seaside View, Parañaque, Metro Manila	
Win	3–0	(Philippines) Jeffrey Torio	MD	6	2008-09-07	(Philippines) Elorde Sports Center, Parañaque, Metro Manila	
Win	2–0	(Philippines) Jeffrey Torio	UD	4	2008-05-07	(Philippines) Barangay San Dionisio, Parañaque, Metro Manila	
Win	1–0	(Philippines) Michael Dan	MD	4	2008-04-19	(Philippines) Elorde Sports Center, Parañaque, Metro Manila	Professional debut.
