= Moises Padilla =

Municipality in Negros Occidental, Philippines

Moises Padilla Magallon
- Municipality
- Municipality of Moises Padilla
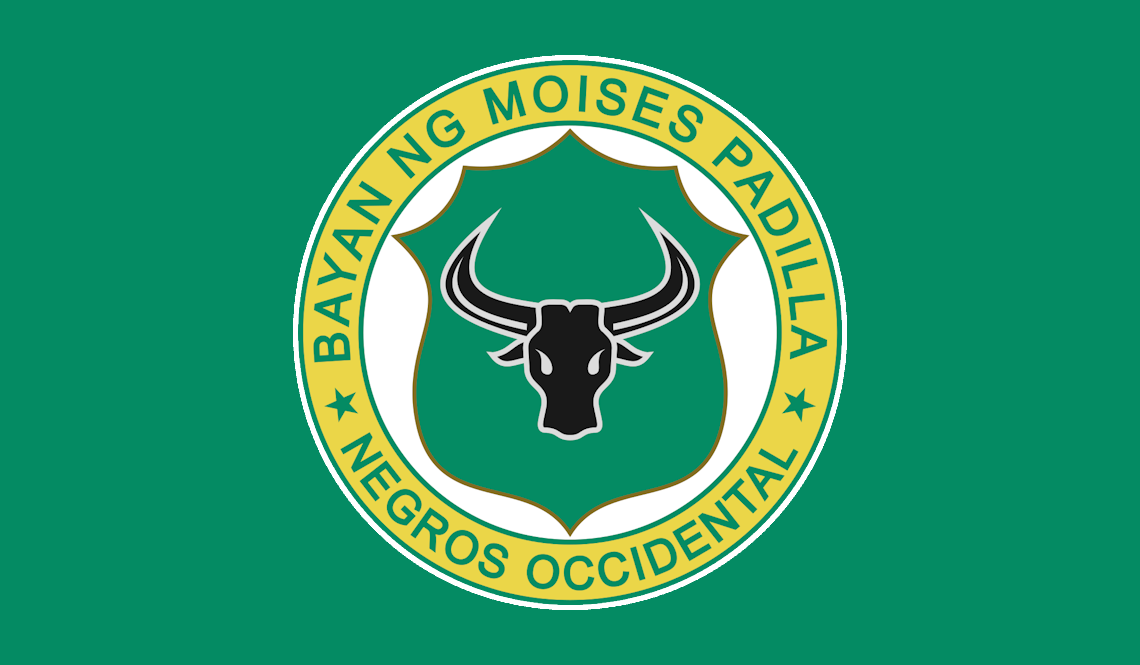
- Flag Seal

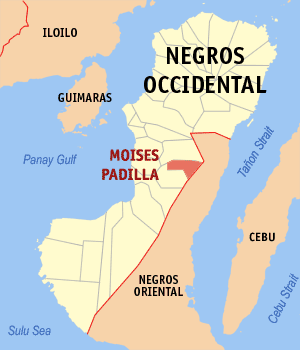
- Map of Negros Occidental with Moises Padilla highlighted
- Interactive map of Moises Padilla
- Location within the Philippines
- Coordinates: 10°16′N 123°05′E
- Country: Philippines
- Region: Negros Island Region
- Province: Negros Occidental
- District: 5th district
- Founded: 1951
- Named for: Lt. Moises Padilla
- Barangays: 15 (see Barangays)

Government
  - Type: Sangguniang Bayan
  - Mayor: Ella Celestina D. Garcia-Yulo (UNegA)
  - Vice Mayor: Felix Mathias Segundo F. Yulo III (UNegA)
  - Representative: Emilio Bernardino L. Yulo III (Lakas)
  - Municipal Council: Members: Absalon V. Alconera, Sr.; Romulo E. Fajardo, Sr.; Vincent Bryan G. Garcia; Joenes T. Frias; Omega P. Bangcaya; Jose Morito J. Flores; Dowen Michael S. Ogatis; Pedro A. Magquilat, Jr.; Anna Marie B. Abibuag ^{◌}; ◌ ex officio SK chairman
  - Electorate: 27,877 voters (2025)

Area
  - Total: 144.10 km^{2} (55.64 sq mi)
- Elevation: 70 m (230 ft)
- Highest elevation: 297 m (974 ft)
- Lowest elevation: 21 m (69 ft)

Population (2024 census)
  - Total: 44,864
  - Density: 311.34/km^{2} (806.37/sq mi)
  - Households: 9,657

Economy
  - Income class: 2nd municipal income class
  - Poverty incidence: 36.24% (2023)
  - Revenue: ₱ 199.3 million (2024)
  - Assets: ₱ 705.6 million (2024)
  - Expenditure: ₱ 157.5 million (2024)
  - Liabilities: ₱ 160.7 million (2024)

Service provider
  - Electricity: Negros Occidental Electric Cooperative (NOCECO)
- Time zone: UTC+8 (PST)
- ZIP code: 6132
- PSGC: 064519000
- IDD : area code: +63 (0)34
- Native languages: Hiligaynon; Tagalog; Cebuano
- Website: www.moisespadilla.gov.ph

Moises Padilla, officially the Municipality of Moises Padilla (Hiligaynon: Banwa sang Moises Padilla; Tagalog: Bayan ng Moises Padilla), is a municipality in the province of Negros Occidental, Philippines. According to the 2024 census, it has a population of 44,864 people.

Formerly known as Magallon, it is famous for its vast livestock yard, the major source of income of the town. Traders all over the island of Negros come to buy, sell, and trade a variety of farm and dairy animals. The town's official emblem shows the "Carabao" or the Water buffalo.

== History ==
Through Republic Act 631 of 1951 authored and sponsored by Congressman Augurio Maranon Abeto, third congressional representative of Negros Occidental, the barrios of Magallon, Odiong and Guinpanaan, then belonging to the town of Isabela, were separated to form the town of Magallon. The boundary between the two towns were as surveyed by the Bureau of lands in accordance with Resolution No. 1. of the joint session of the Provincial Board of Negros Occidental and the Municipal Council of Isabela dated November 15, 1949, and subsequently concurred to by Resolution No. 79 of the Municipal Council of Isabela dated December 26, 1949.

In 1957, the town was renamed to Moises Padilla, a politician who was tortured and killed by assassins of former Negros Occidental governor Rafael Lacson.

== Geography ==
Moises Padilla is situated in the central part of Negros Island. The location of the town provides a good view of the Kanlaon Volcano in its near perfect cone shape. Along the east side part of the town is the longest river in Negros Island, the Binalbagan River.

The town a natural spring in the heart of the town. Large concrete storage tanks were constructed to store the clean and fresh water. No mechanical device is needed to extract the water.

=== Barangays ===
Moises Padilla is politically subdivided into 15 barangays. Each barangay consists of puroks and some have sitios.

- Barangay 1 (Poblacion)
- Barangay 2 (Poblacion)
- Barangay 3 (Poblacion)
- Barangay 4 (Poblacion)
- Barangay 5 (Poblacion)
- Barangay 6 (Poblacion)
- Barangay 7 (Poblacion)
- Crossing Magallon
- Guinpana-an
- Inolingan (Hda. Salapid)
- Macagahay
- Magallon Cadre.
- Montilla
- Odiong
- Quintin Remo

=== Climate ===
Climate data for Moises Padilla, Negros Occidental
Month	Jan	Feb	Mar	Apr	May	Jun	Jul	Aug	Sep	Oct	Nov	Dec	Year
Mean daily maximum °C (°F)	28 (82)	29 (84)	30 (86)	32 (90)	31 (88)	30 (86)	29 (84)	29 (84)	29 (84)	29 (84)	29 (84)	29 (84)	30 (85)
Mean daily minimum °C (°F)	23 (73)	23 (73)	23 (73)	24 (75)	25 (77)	25 (77)	25 (77)	25 (77)	25 (77)	24 (75)	24 (75)	23 (73)	24 (75)
Average precipitation mm (inches)	100 (3.9)	75 (3.0)	90 (3.5)	101 (4.0)	183 (7.2)	242 (9.5)	215 (8.5)	198 (7.8)	205 (8.1)	238 (9.4)	194 (7.6)	138 (5.4)	1,979 (77.9)
Average rainy days	14.9	11.3	14.5	17.4	26.4	28.4	28.5	27.5	26.9	28.4	24.2	17.2	265.6
Source: Meteoblue

== Demographics ==
Population census of Moises Padilla
Year	Pop.	±% p.a.
1960	13,301	—
1970	17,565	+2.82%
1975	22,106	+4.72%
1980	22,916	+0.72%
1990	30,742	+2.98%
1995	31,350	+0.37%
2000	34,658	+2.17%
2007	39,239	+1.73%
2010	39,257	+0.02%
2015	41,386	+1.01%
2020	43,462	+1.04%
2024	44,864	+0.77%
Source: Philippine Statistics Authority

=== Languages ===
Hiligaynon is the main language of Moises Padilla followed by Cebuano. Tagalog and English are also used.

=== Religion ===
Majority of the people in the municipality are Christians.

== Economy ==
Poverty incidence of Moises Padilla (%)

Source: Philippine Statistics Authority

Sugarcane, rice, corn, root crops, lumber, and livestock are the main produce of the town.

== Transportation ==
Regular trips of bus and other utility vehicles to and from Bacolod, Canlaon in Negros Oriental, and Cebu City.

== See also ==
- List of renamed cities and municipalities in the Philippines
