= Himamaylan =

Component city in Negros Occidental, Philippines

- Component city
- City of Himamaylan
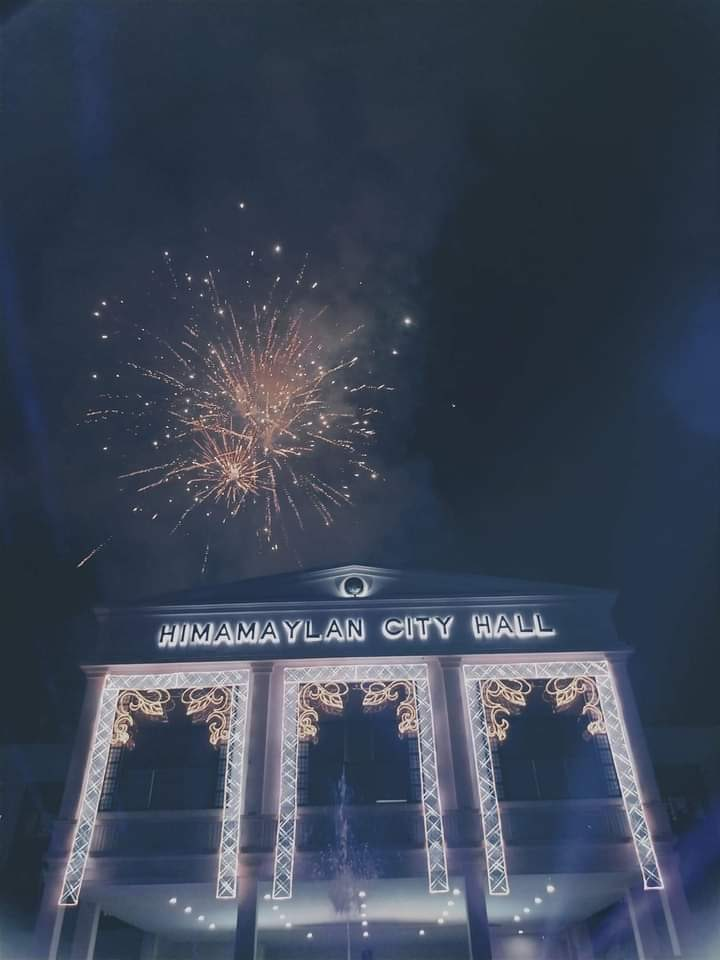
- Himamaylan City Hall

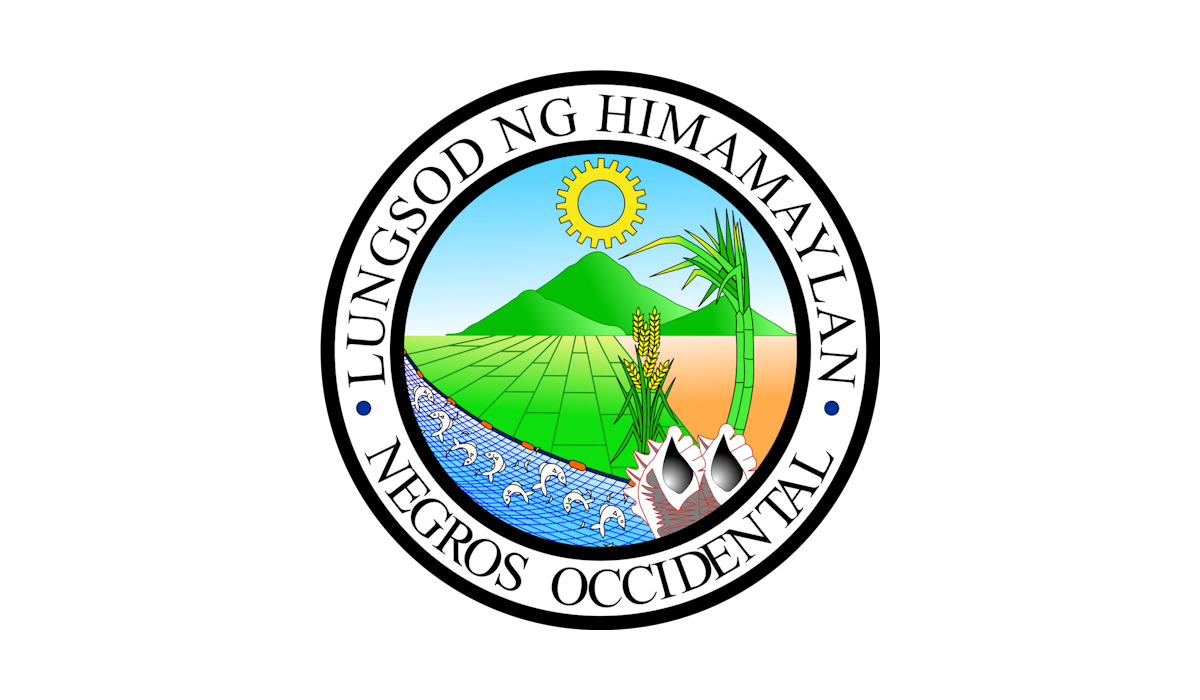
- Flag Seal
- Nicknames: Maylan; Home of Himaya Festival and Patik Kawayan
- Motto: Maylan: My Land
- Interactive map of Himamaylan
- Location within the Philippines
- Coordinates: 10°06′N 122°52′E
- Country: Philippines
- Region: Negros Island Region
- Province: Negros Occidental
- District: 5th district
- Founded: 1575
- Cityhood: March 5, 2001
- Barangays: 19 (see Barangays)

Government
  - Type: Sangguniang Panlungsod
  - Mayor: Rogelio Raymund I. Tongson Jr.
  - Vice Mayor: Justin Dominic S. Gatuslao (UNegA)
  - Representative: Emilio Bernardino L. Yulo III (Lakas)
  - City Council: Members: Julie Ann T. Vasquez; Johny T. Ades; Emmanuel V. Castro; Ricky T. Genova; Richard N. Genada; Pablo M. Libo-on; Teresita A. Gamposilao; Esther Marie B. Tongson; Jacinto B. Castillo; Marie Antoinette R. Limsiaco; Jeda Pampliega ^{◌}; ◌ ex officio SK chairman
  - Electorate: 77,802 voters (2025)

Area
  - Total: 367.04 km^{2} (141.71 sq mi)
- Elevation: 230 m (750 ft)
- Highest elevation: 1,459 m (4,787 ft)
- Lowest elevation: 0 m (0 ft)

Population (2024 census)
  - Total: 117,286
  - Density: 319.55/km^{2} (827.62/sq mi)
  - Households: 28,225

Economy
  - Income class: 2nd city income class
  - Poverty incidence: 27.98% (2023)
  - Revenue: ₱ 111.4 million (2024)
  - Assets: ₱ 3,566 million (2024)
  - Expenditure: ₱ 243.7 million (2024)
  - Liabilities: ₱ 528.7 million (2024)

Service provider
  - Electricity: Negros Occidental Electric Cooperative (NOCECO)
- Time zone: UTC+8 (PST)
- ZIP code: 6108
- PSGC: 064510000
- IDD : area code: +63 (0)34
- Native languages: Hiligaynon; Tagalog
- Website: himamaylancity.gov.ph

Himamaylan (/hiːmɑːˈmaɪlən/), officially the City of Himamaylan (Hiligaynon: Dakbanwa/Syudad sang Himamaylan; Filipino: Lungsod ng Himamaylan), is a component city in the province of Negros Occidental, Philippines. According to the 2024 census, it has a population of 117,286 people.

Due to its coastal location, it is a rich source of different types of seafood, mainly fish, oysters, mussels and shrimps. The city celebrates the Himaya Festival every April 14–25.

== Etymology ==
During the Spanish and American colonial periods, the town’s name was commonly spelled as “Guimamaylan” or “Gimamaylan.”

The name of Himamaylan is derived from “Mamaylan,” one of the pre-colonial names for Negros Island used by Cebuano-speaking Visayans, and likely refers to an early settlement in the area.

== History ==
In 1795, Himamaylan became the capital of Negros. At that time, the city served as a garrison for occupying Spanish forces. Today, the old Spanish-built fort constructed as a lookout point for frequent Moro raids is one of the historical attractions found in the city.

=== Cityhood ===
On March 5, 2001, the Philippine Congress passed Republic Act No. 9028, providing for the conversion of the municipality into a city after a favourable plebiscite, making it the only city in the 5th District of the province.

== Geography ==
Himamaylan is located at the centre-most cove on the coastline of Negros Island. Himamaylan has a natural harbour characterised by deep waters favourable to access by marine vessels.

Located in the centre of the island, the city is conducive to operations reaching all parts of the country and the rest of Southeast Asia from a strategic point. Most portions of the city are plains and generally have fertile soil, conducive for agriculture. The city's rivers are 12 feet (3.7 m) or deeper, providing drainage for farmland.

This city is 75 kilometres (47 mi) south of Bacolod, the provincial capital, and 140 kilometres (87 mi) from Dumaguete.

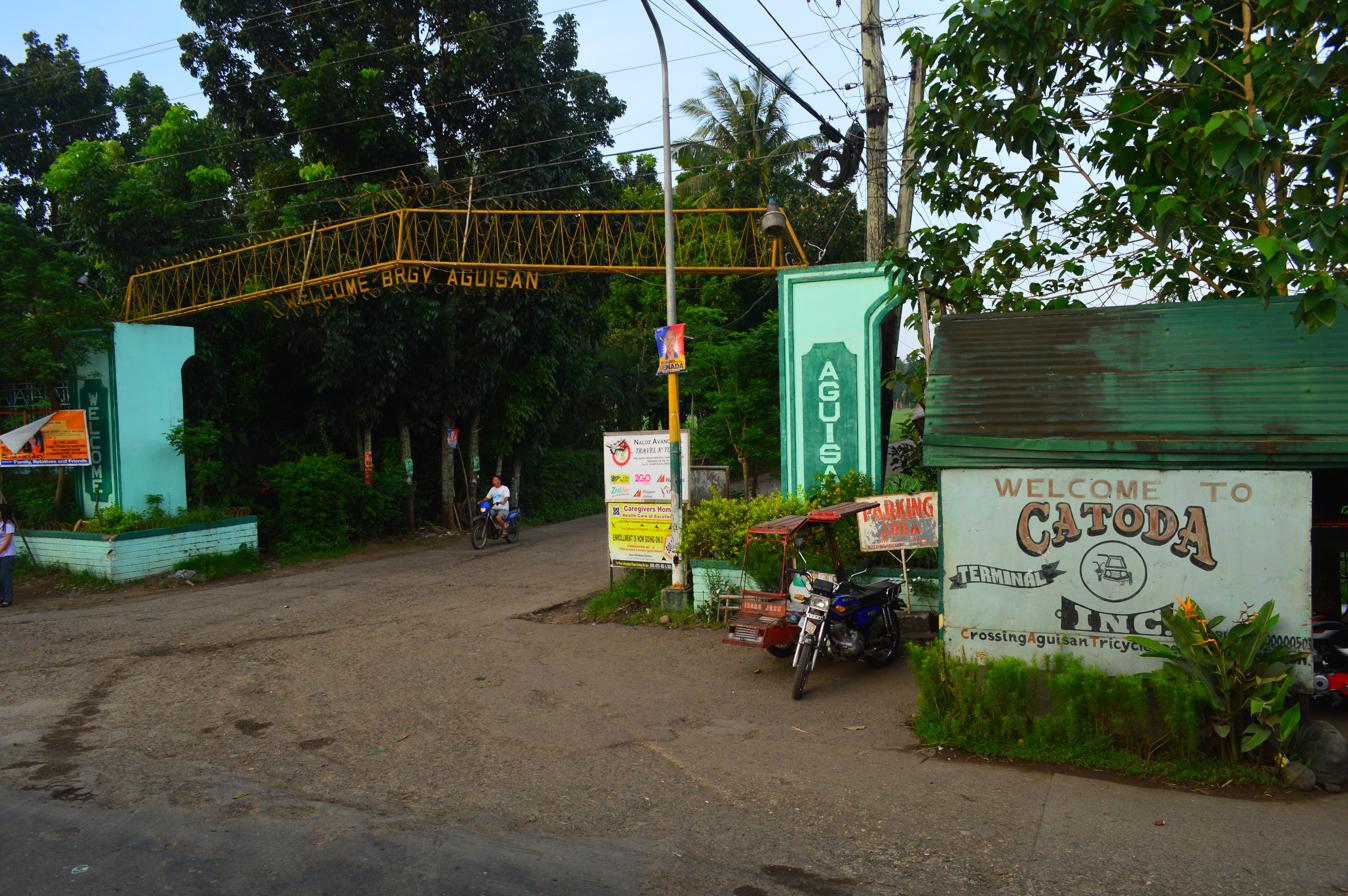
Entry to Barangay Aguisan

=== Barangays ===
Himamaylan is politically subdivided into 19 barangays. Each barangay consists of puroks and some have sitios.

- Aguisan
- Buenavista
- Cabadiangan
- Cabanbanan
- Carabalan
- Caradio-an
- Libacao
- Mambagaton
- Nabali-an
- Mahalang
- San Antonio
- Sara-et
- Su-ay
- Talaban
- To-oy
- Barangay I (Poblacion)
- Barangay II (Poblacion)
- Barangay III (Poblacion)
- Barangay IV (Poblacion)

=== Climate ===
Climate data for Himamaylan
| Month | Jan | Feb | Mar | Apr | May | Jun | Jul | Aug | Sep | Oct | Nov | Dec | Year |
|---|---|---|---|---|---|---|---|---|---|---|---|---|---|
| Mean daily maximum °C (°F) | 30 (86) | 31 (88) | 32 (90) | 33 (91) | 32 (90) | 30 (86) | 29 (84) | 29 (84) | 29 (84) | 29 (84) | 30 (86) | 30 (86) | 30 (87) |
| Mean daily minimum °C (°F) | 22 (72) | 22 (72) | 22 (72) | 24 (75) | 25 (77) | 25 (77) | 25 (77) | 24 (75) | 24 (75) | 24 (75) | 23 (73) | 23 (73) | 24 (74) |
| Average precipitation mm (inches) | 38 (1.5) | 29 (1.1) | 55 (2.2) | 65 (2.6) | 141 (5.6) | 210 (8.3) | 212 (8.3) | 176 (6.9) | 180 (7.1) | 180 (7.1) | 130 (5.1) | 70 (2.8) | 1,486 (58.6) |
| Average rainy days | 9.0 | 7.2 | 11.1 | 13.5 | 25.6 | 28.4 | 28.9 | 27.3 | 26.9 | 27.7 | 21.8 | 13.8 | 241.2 |
Source: Meteoblue

== Demographics ==
Population census of Himamaylan
| Year | Pop. | ±% p.a. |
|---|---|---|
| 1903 | 14,932 | — |
| 1918 | 15,559 | +0.27% |
| 1939 | 28,407 | +2.91% |
| 1948 | 33,984 | +2.01% |
| 1960 | 41,985 | +1.78% |
| 1970 | 53,663 | +2.48% |
| 1975 | 65,521 | +4.09% |
| 1980 | 70,467 | +1.47% |
| 1990 | 81,014 | +1.40% |
| 1995 | 83,268 | +0.52% |
| 2000 | 88,684 | +1.36% |
| 2007 | 102,014 | +1.95% |
| 2010 | 103,006 | +0.35% |
| 2015 | 106,880 | +0.71% |
| 2020 | 116,240 | +1.78% |
| 2024 | 117,286 | +0.22% |
Source: Philippine Statistics Authority

=== Language ===
The people in the city speak Hiligaynon. Tagalog and English are generally understood.

== Economy ==
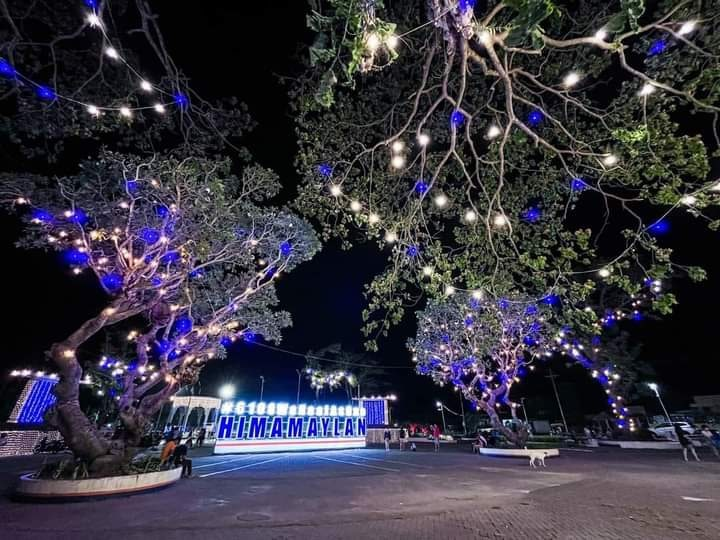
Himamaylan City Public Plaza

Poverty incidence of Himamaylan (%)

Source: Philippine Statistics Authority

The city's main sources of livelihood include fishery, sugarcane farming and sugar production, rice farming, mango cultivation and ethanol exports.

== Notable personalities ==
- Rolando Bohol – Boxer, International Boxing Federation Flyweight champion
- Bernard Bonnin – Film and television actor
- Charlene Gonzales – Beauty Queen, Philippine representative to the Miss Universe 1994 beauty pageant where she placed in the Top 6, Film and Television actress
- Andres Muhlach – Film and television actor, model
- Atasha Muhlach – Television actress and host, singer, model, debutante at the Bal des débutantes 2022
- Ryan Sermona - World Boxing Council Super featherweight champion

== Sister city ==
- Taguig, Metro Manila
- Cebu City
