= Jose Apolinario Lozada =

Filipino politician and diplomat (1950-2018)

- Official portrait, 2004

Member of Philippine House of Representatives from Negros Occidental's 5th congressional district
- In office June 30, 1998 – June 30, 2004
- Preceded by: Mariano Yulo
- Succeeded by: Ignacio Arroyo Jr.

Personal details
- Born: Jose Apolinario Leconia Lozada Jr. August 17, 1950 Quezon City, Philippines
- Died: July 31, 2018 (aged 67) Quezon City, Philippines
- Party: PMP (2009–2018)
- Other political affiliations: Lakas–CMD (1998–2009)

Jose Apolinario "Jun" Leconia Lozada Jr. (August 17, 1950 – July 31, 2018) was a Filipino diplomat and politician.

== Biography ==
=== Early life and education ===
He was born in Quezon City. Lozada studied mathematics at De La Salle University. He earned two master's degrees, in physics and public administration, at Silliman University and the University of the Philippines, respectively.

=== Diplomatic career ===
Lozada was Philippine ambassador to the Vatican, Austria, and Palau, before serving as adviser and secretary to Fidel Ramos between 1992 and 1998.

=== House of Representatives ===
Lozada was elected to the House of Representatives from Negros Occidental fifth district for the first time in 1998, and won reelection in 2001. He was allied with Lakas–CMD. Over the course of his legislative tenure, Lozada led the House committee of foreign affairs, authored the Dual Citizenship Act, and helped pass the Overseas Absentee Voting Law. Lozada also authored and filed a bill in March 1999 seeking the establishment of a Pasig River Development Office to better solve the pollution problem of the Pasig River.

=== 2010 Senate bid ===
In 2010, Lozada launched an unsuccessful campaign for a Senate seat, representing Pwersa ng Masang Pilipino.

=== Later life and death ===
He was diagnosed with prostate cancer in 2014. After treatment, the cancer went into remission the next year. Lozada died of a brain hemorrhage on July 31, 2018, at the National Kidney and Transplant Institute in Quezon City.
