= Jeffrey Ferrer =

Filipino politician

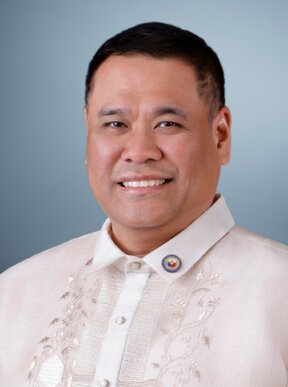
- Official portrait, 2025

Member of the House of Representatives of the Philippines from Negros Occidental's 4th District
- Incumbent
- Assumed office June 30, 2025
- Preceded by: Juliet Marie Ferrer
- In office June 30, 2007 – June 30, 2016
- Preceded by: Charlie Cojuangco
- Succeeded by: Juliet Marie Ferrer

Vice Governor of Negros Occidental
- In office June 30, 2019 – June 30, 2025
- Governor: Bong Lacson
- Preceded by: Bong Lacson
- Succeeded by: Jose Benito Alonso

Mayor of La Carlota, Negros Occidental
- In office June 30, 2004 – June 30, 2007

Member of the La Carlota City Council
- In office June 30, 1998 – June 30, 2004

Personal details
- Born: Jeffrey Padilla Ferrer; May 6, 1969 (age 57) Bacolod, Negros Occidental, Philippines
- Party: NUP (2012–present); UNEGA (local party; 2004–present)
- Other political affiliations: Independent (2009–2012); NPC (2007–2009); Reporma (until 2004)
- Spouse: Juliet Marie Ferrer
- Children: Julius Martin Asistio
- Occupation: Politician

Jeffrey Padilla Ferrer (born May 6, 1969) is a Filipino politician who served as the representative of the Fourth District of Negros Occidental in the House of Representatives of the Philippines from 2007 to 2016, and as Vice Governor of the province from 2019 to 2025, and as Congressman again in 2025.

== Personal life ==
Jeffrey Padilla Ferrer was born on May 6, 1969 in Negros Occidental. He is currently married to former Congresswoman, Juliet Marie Ferrer. He has a step-son, Julius Martin Asistio, who has served as a city councilor of La Carlota since 2016.

== Political career ==
=== Local politics ===
Ferrer was first elected in Barangay 1, La Carlota City, serving as a kagawad from 1990 to 1998. He was elected as city councilor in 1998 and held that post until 2004. In the same year, he won election as Mayor of La Carlota City and served until 2007.

=== Congressman (2007–2016) ===
In 2007, Ferrer successfully ran for the House of Representatives, representing Negros Occidental’s 4th congressional district. He was first elected under the Nationalist People’s Coalition (NPC), was re‑elected in 2010 as an independent, and again in 2013 under the National Unity Party (NUP). His tenure ended in 2016, and was succeeded by his wife.

During his time in Congress, he became the first and only NPC nominee to have his Certificate of Nomination and Acceptance (CONA) withdrawn in 2012, amid internal party disputes.

=== Vice Governorship (2019–2025) ===
Ferrer returned to politics in 2019 and was elected Vice Governor of Negros Occidental in 2019, running unopposed under a Love Negros - UNegA coalition. He secured re‑election in 2022, also unopposed. During his two terms, Ferrer served as acting governor on several occasions.

In August 2024, President Bongbong Marcos appointed him Personal Adviser for Western Visayas. He declined the cabinet-rank equivalent, opting to retain his vice governorship.

Ferrer also emerged as the richest member of the Negros Occidental Provincial Board, with a net worth of ₱106.54 million in 2019.

=== Return to Congress (2025–present) ===
With his wife term-limited in 2025, Ferrer filed his Certificate of Candidacy for the 4th congressional district seat on October 6, 2024. He received broad support from the UNegA–Love Negros coalition and retained an endorsement from Governor Bong Lacson despite the NPC nominating an opposing candidate.

He was elected Representative again in May 2025, succeeding his wife. He assumed office on June 30, 2025.

In the 20th Congress, Ferrer was appointed chairman of the Philippine House Committee on Legislative Franchises.
