= La Castellana, Negros Occidental =

Municipality in Negros Occidental, Philippines

La Castellana
- Municipality
- Municipality of La Castellana
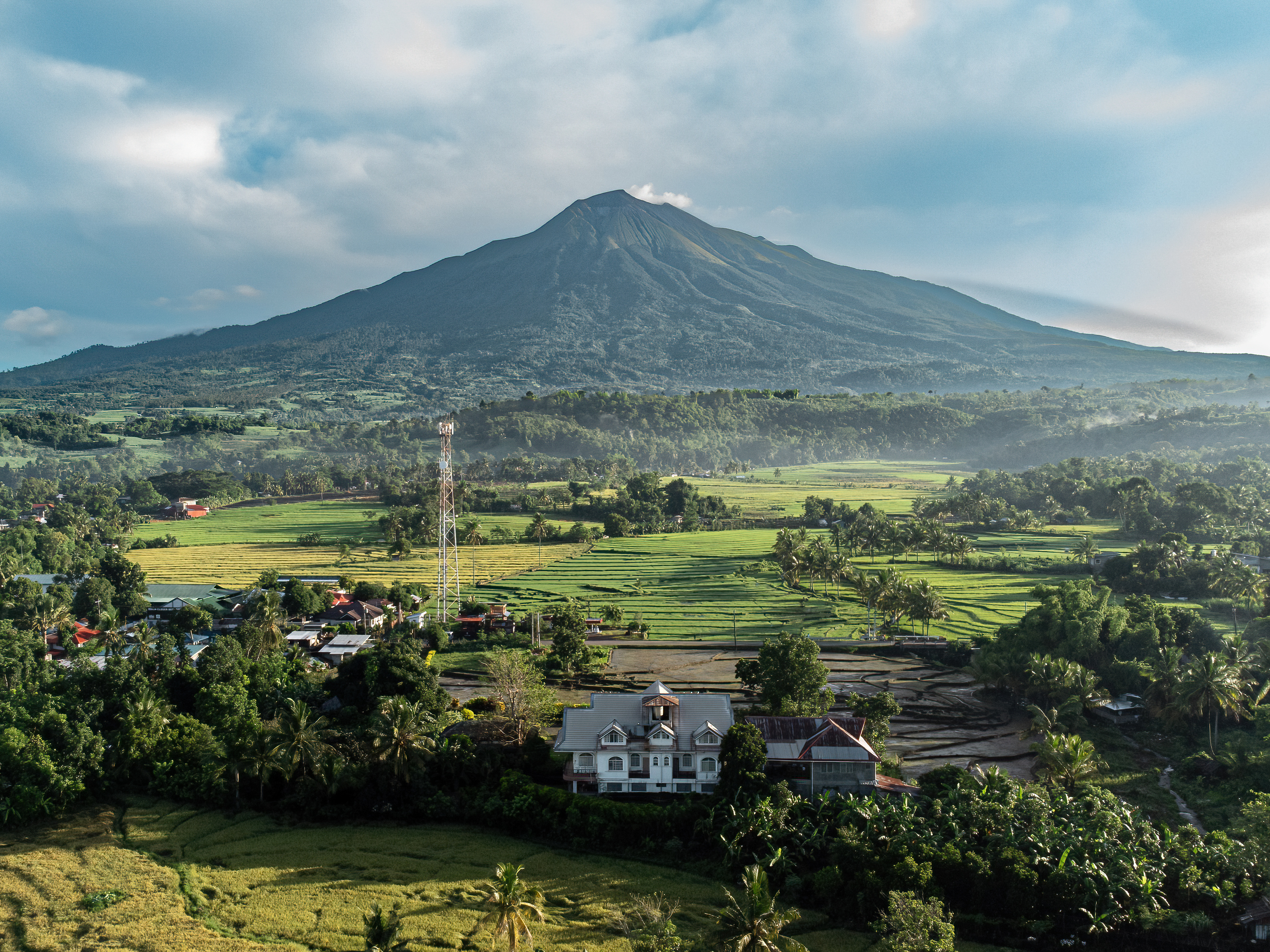
- Kanlaon from Brgy. Cabacungan

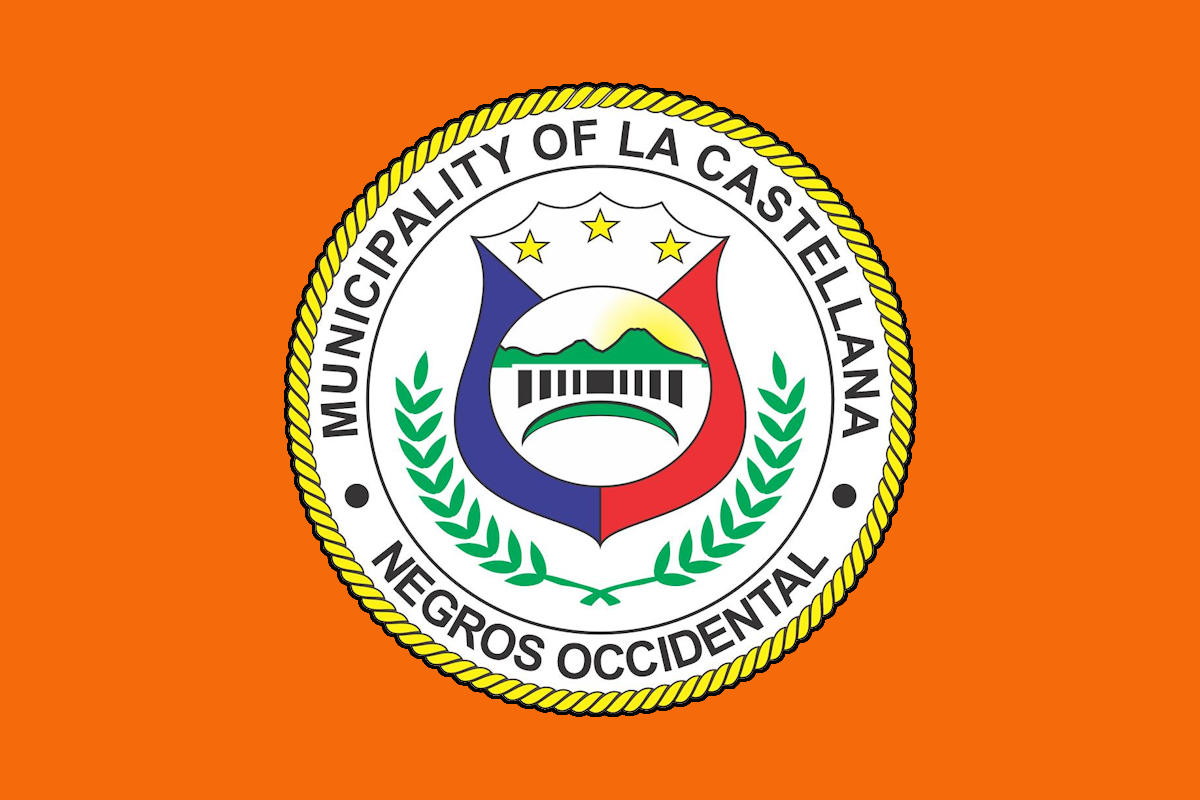
- Flag Seal

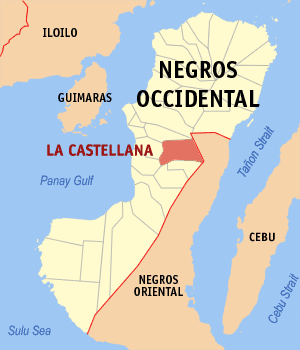
- Map of Negros Occidental with La Castellana highlighted
- Interactive map of La Castellana
- Location within the Philippines
- Coordinates: 10°21′N 123°04′E
- Country: Philippines
- Region: Negros Island Region
- Province: Negros Occidental
- District: 5th district
- Founded: January 1, 1918
- Named for: Paseo de la Castellana
- Barangays: 13 (see Barangays)

Government
  - Type: Sangguniang Bayan
  - Mayor: Añejo G. Nicor (Lakas)
  - Vice Mayor: Alme Rhummyla G. Nicor-Mangilimutan (UNegA)
  - Representative: Emilio Bernardino L. Yulo III (Lakas)
  - Municipal Council: Members: Pritz V. Timbad; Christine Thel A. Geollegue; Nel John N. Labesores; Felix U. Feria V; Lara Angelika G. Vera-Guanzon; Kaye P. Cabalatungan-Enriquez; Alberto A. Nicor, Jr.; Marven Paolo J. Magno, Jr.
  - Electorate: 51,604 voters (2025)

Area
  - Total: 185.22 km^{2} (71.51 sq mi)
- Elevation: 77 m (253 ft)
- Highest elevation: 244 m (801 ft)
- Lowest elevation: 25 m (82 ft)

Population (2024 census)
  - Total: 82,500
  - Density: 445/km^{2} (1,150/sq mi)
  - Households: 5,398

Economy
  - Income class: 1st municipal income class
  - Poverty incidence: 26.69% (2023)
  - Revenue: ₱ 305 million (2024)
  - Assets: ₱ 495.2 million (2024)
  - Expenditure: ₱ 285.6 million (2024)
  - Liabilities: ₱ 360.8 million (2024)

Service provider
  - Electricity: Negros Occidental Electric Cooperative (NOCECO)
- Time zone: UTC+8 (PST)
- ZIP code: 6131
- PSGC: 064517000
- IDD : area code: +63 (0)34
- Native languages: Hiligaynon; Tagalog; Cebuano

La Castellana, officially the Municipality of La Castellana, is a municipality in the province of Negros Occidental, Philippines. According to the 2024 census, it has a population of 82,500 people.

== Etymology ==
The town is named after the Paseo de la Castellana in Madrid, Spain.

== History ==
According to local tradition, the early settlers of the town originated from Marayo (now Pontevedra), and initially referred to their settlement as the village of “Lapak.”

During the Spanish colonial period, the area was renamed La Castellana due to its resemblance in vegetation to Paseo de la Castellana in Madrid. The Spaniards established haciendas and sugar plantations, significantly boosting the local economy and attracting migrants and workers from various regions. As a result, the town developed into an important center of trade and commerce.

Under American rule, La Castellana was formally established as a municipality on January 1, 1918, through Executive Order No. 101 issued by Governor-General Francis Burton Harrison.

== Geography ==
La Castellana lies at the base of Kanlaon Volcano, known for its natural springs and water falls. It is 65 kilometres (40 mi) from Bacolod and 22 kilometres (14 mi) from Pontevedra.

=== Barangays ===
La Castellana is politically subdivided into 13 barangays. Each barangay consists of puroks and some have sitios.

- Biaknabato
- Cabacungan
- Cabagnaan
- Camandag
- Lalagsan
- Manghanoy
- Mansalanao
- Masulog
- Nato
- Puso
- Robles (Poblacion)
- Sag-ang
- Talaptap

=== Climate ===
Climate data for La Castellana, Negros Occidental
| Month | Jan | Feb | Mar | Apr | May | Jun | Jul | Aug | Sep | Oct | Nov | Dec | Year |
|---|---|---|---|---|---|---|---|---|---|---|---|---|---|
| Mean daily maximum °C (°F) | 28 (82) | 29 (84) | 30 (86) | 32 (90) | 31 (88) | 30 (86) | 29 (84) | 29 (84) | 29 (84) | 29 (84) | 29 (84) | 28 (82) | 29 (85) |
| Mean daily minimum °C (°F) | 20 (68) | 22 (72) | 23 (73) | 24 (75) | 25 (77) | 25 (77) | 24 (75) | 24 (75) | 24 (75) | 24 (75) | 24 (75) | 23 (73) | 24 (74) |
| Average precipitation mm (inches) | 100 (3.9) | 75 (3.0) | 90 (3.5) | 101 (4.0) | 183 (7.2) | 242 (9.5) | 215 (8.5) | 198 (7.8) | 205 (8.1) | 238 (9.4) | 194 (7.6) | 138 (5.4) | 1,979 (77.9) |
| Average rainy days | 14.9 | 11.3 | 14.5 | 17.4 | 26.4 | 28.4 | 28.5 | 27.5 | 26.9 | 28.4 | 24.2 | 17.2 | 265.6 |
Source: Meteoblue

== Demographics ==
Population census of La Castellana
| Year | Pop. | ±% p.a. |
|---|---|---|
| 1903 | 5,329 | — |
| 1918 | 8,087 | +2.82% |
| 1939 | 16,861 | +3.56% |
| 1948 | 24,654 | +4.31% |
| 1960 | 35,630 | +3.12% |
| 1970 | 34,881 | −0.21% |
| 1975 | 41,821 | +3.71% |
| 1980 | 44,684 | +1.33% |
| 1990 | 54,368 | +1.98% |
| 1995 | 59,620 | +1.74% |
| 2000 | 59,102 | −0.19% |
| 2007 | 70,838 | +2.53% |
| 2010 | 71,013 | +0.09% |
| 2015 | 74,855 | +1.01% |
| 2020 | 79,492 | +1.27% |
| 2024 | 82,500 | +0.90% |
Source: Philippine Statistics Authority

== Economy ==
La Castellana is an agricultural town engaged in sugarcane, rice, and banana farming.

Poverty incidence of La Castellana (%)

Source: Philippine Statistics Authority

== Culture and tourism ==
La Castellana holds many festivals namely Bailes de Luces, Banana Festival and Senior San Vicente Ferrer Feast Day where devotees far and near attend to for healing. Caduhada Spring Resort is a popular tourist spot located in Sitio Mambangon, Barangay Cabacungan.
