= Binalbagan =

Municipality in Negros Occidental, Philippines

- Municipality
- Municipality of Binalbagan
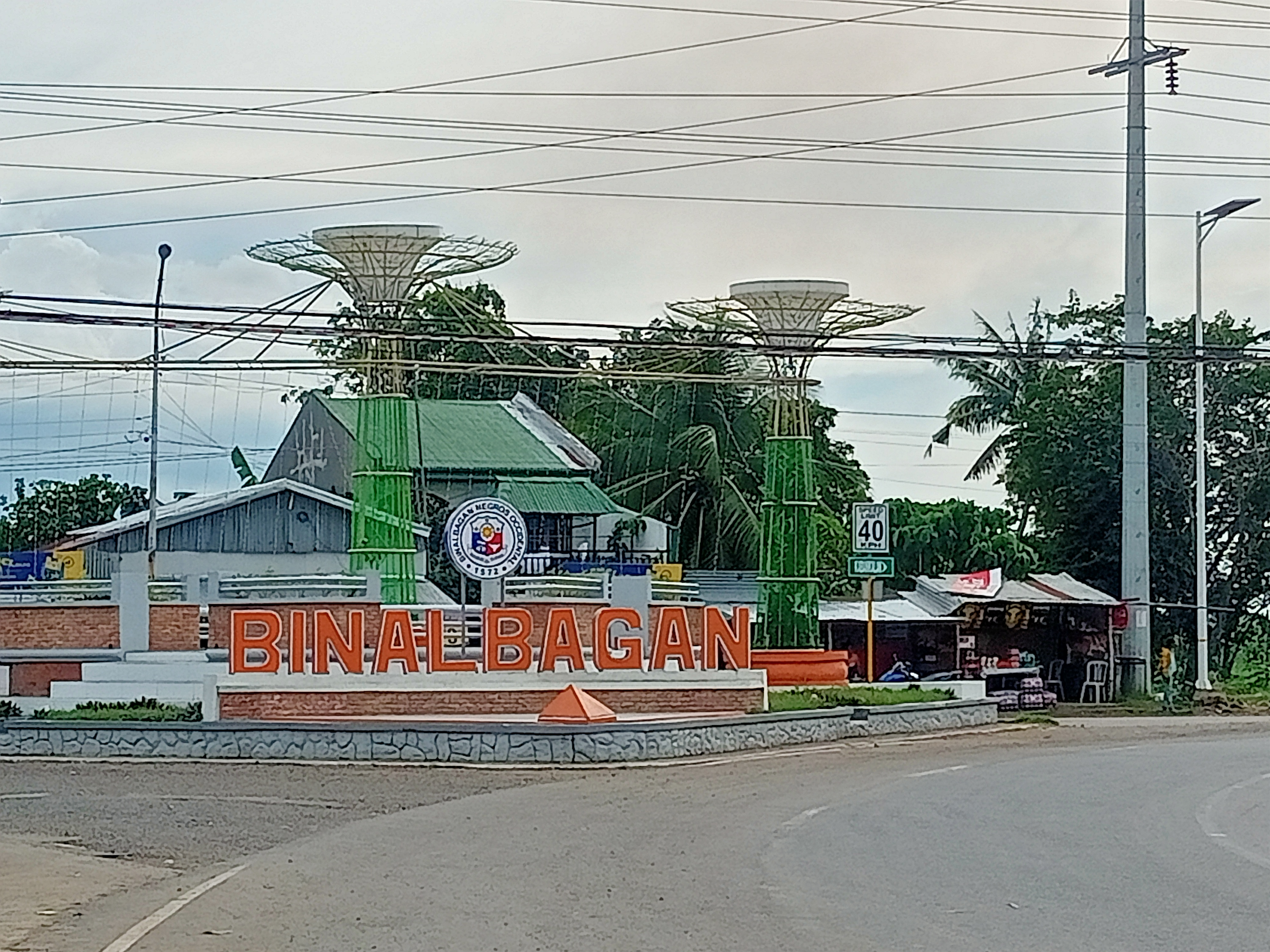
- Binalbagan welcome marker

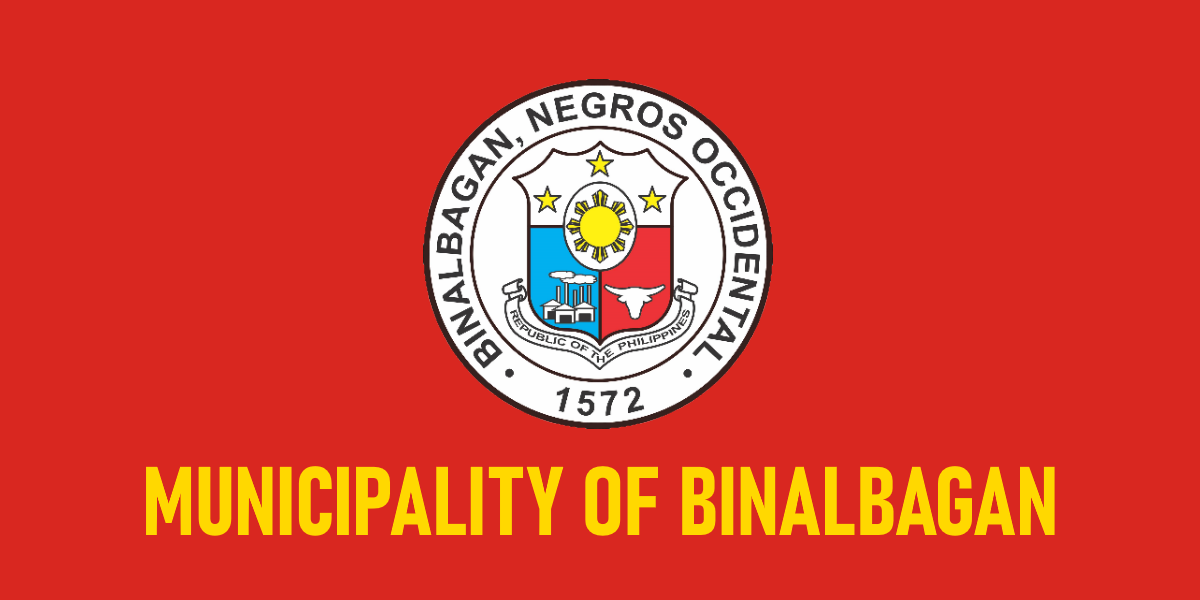
- Flag Seal
- Nicknames: The True Heart of Negros; Banwang Panganay
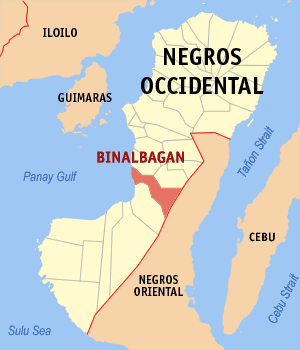
- Map of Negros Occidental with Binalbagan highlighted
- Interactive map of Binalbagan
- Location within the Philippines
- Coordinates: 10°12′N 122°52′E
- Country: Philippines
- Region: Negros Island Region
- Province: Negros Occidental
- District: 5th district
- Founded: May 15, 1572
- Barangays: 16 (see Barangays)

Government
  - Type: Sangguniang Bayan
  - Mayor: Emmanuel I. Aranda
  - Vice Mayor: Mary Ann T. Mirasol (UNegA)
  - Representative: Emilio Bernardino L. Yulo III (Lakas)
  - Municipal Council: Members: John Henry T. Tajonera; Nicola Therese P. Yusay; Ursecio B. Inodeo; Arnie M. Sarad; Jerry S. Yulo; Delilah S. Gavaran; Danilo T. Sevilla, Jr.; Alan Paul P. Mirasol; Reggie P. Gedoria ^{‡}; Gemnell C. Verzosa ^{◌}; ‡ ex officio ABC president; ◌ ex officio SK chairman
  - Electorate: 45,508 voters (2025)

Area
  - Total: 189.96 km^{2} (73.34 sq mi)
- Elevation: 5.0 m (16.4 ft)
- Highest elevation: 34 m (112 ft)
- Lowest elevation: 0 m (0 ft)

Population (2024 census)
  - Total: 72,594
  - Density: 382.15/km^{2} (989.77/sq mi)
  - Households: 17,305

Economy
  - Income class: 1st municipal income class
  - Poverty incidence: 20.54% (2023)
  - Revenue: ₱ 363.3 million (2024)
  - Assets: ₱ 876.2 million (2024)
  - Expenditure: ₱ 155.7 million (2024)
  - Liabilities: ₱ 269.6 million (2024)

Service provider
  - Electricity: Negros Occidental Electric Cooperative (NOCECO)
- Time zone: UTC+8 (PST)
- ZIP code: 6107
- PSGC: 064503000
- IDD : area code: +63 (0)34
- Native languages: Hiligaynon; Tagalog
- Website: www.binalbagan.gov.ph

Binalbagan, officially the Municipality of Binalbagan (Hiligaynon: Banwa sang Binalbagan; Tagalog: Bayan ng Binalbagan), is a municipality in the province of Negros Occidental, Philippines. According to the 2024 census, it has a population of 72,594 people.

Major economic activities include manufacturing, agriculture, services, cottage industries and tourism. Binalbagan is also known for the Binalbagan Isabela Sugar Company (BISCOM).

== History ==
Binalbagan was established as a town on May 15, 1572, making it one of the earliest settlements in Negros Occidental (the second being the municipality of Ilog). It is recognized as the oldest town on Negros Island, earning the title “Banwang Panganay” (oldest town).

The municipality celebrates its annual Balbagan Festival every May.

== Geography ==
Binalbagan is 64 kilometres (40 mi) from Bacolod and 151 kilometres (94 mi) from Dumaguete.

=== Barangays ===
Binalbagan is politically subdivided into 16 barangays: thirteen (13) rural barangays and three (3) urban barangays. Each barangay consists of puroks and some have sitios.

Currently, there are 3 barangays which are considered urban (highlighted in bold).

- Amontay
- Bagroy
- Bi-ao
- Canmoros
- Enclaro
- Marina
- **Pagla-um (Poblacion)**
- Payao (formerly Soledad)
- Progreso
- San Jose
- San Juan
- **San Pedro (Poblacion)**
- San Teodoro
- San Vicente
- **Santo Rosario (Poblacion)**
- Santol

=== Climate ===
Climate data for Binalbagan, Negros Occidental
Month	Jan	Feb	Mar	Apr	May	Jun	Jul	Aug	Sep	Oct	Nov	Dec	Year
Mean daily maximum °C (°F)	30 (86)	31 (88)	32 (90)	33 (91)	32 (90)	30 (86)	29 (84)	29 (84)	29 (84)	29 (84)	30 (86)	30 (86)	30 (87)
Mean daily minimum °C (°F)	22 (72)	22 (72)	22 (72)	24 (75)	25 (77)	25 (77)	25 (77)	25 (77)	24 (75)	24 (75)	23 (73)	23 (73)	24 (75)
Average precipitation mm (inches)	38 (1.5)	29 (1.1)	55 (2.2)	65 (2.6)	141 (5.6)	210 (8.3)	212 (8.3)	176 (6.9)	180 (7.1)	180 (7.1)	130 (5.1)	70 (2.8)	1,486 (58.6)
Average rainy days	9.0	7.2	11.1	13.5	25.6	28.4	28.9	27.3	26.9	27.7	21.8	13.8	241.2
Source: Meteoblue

== Demographics ==
Population census of Binalbagan
Year	Pop.	±% p.a.
1903	10,599	—
1918	8,966	−1.11%
1939	18,112	+3.40%
1948	19,748	+0.97%
1960	31,160	+3.87%
1970	36,765	+1.67%
1975	43,968	+3.65%
1980	49,428	+2.37%
1990	52,073	+0.52%
1995	54,664	+0.91%
2000	58,280	+1.38%
2007	64,747	+1.46%
2010	65,431	+0.38%
2015	67,270	+0.53%
2020	71,407	+1.26%
2024	72,594	+0.40%
Source: Philippine Statistics Authority

=== Languages ===
The people in the municipality speak Hiligaynon. Tagalog and English are generally understood.

== Economy ==
Poverty incidence of Binalbagan (%)

Source: Philippine Statistics Authority

== Education ==
Tertiary

- Binalbagan Catholic College
- Carlos Hilado Memorial State University (formerly Negros Occidental School of Fisheries)
- Technological University of the Philippines-Visayas Binalbagan Campus

== Notable personalities ==
- Jose Miguel Tuason Arroyo (first gentleman of former Philippine President, Gloria Macapagal Arroyo)
- Ignacio "Iggy" Tuason Arroyo, Jr. (member of the Philippine House of Representatives)
- Augurio Abeto (dubbed as the "King of Hiligaynon Poetry")
- Ian Clark Bautista (Southeast Asian Games Boxing Gold Medalist)
