= Hinigaran =

Municipality in Negros Occidental, Philippines

- Municipality
- Municipality of Hinigaran
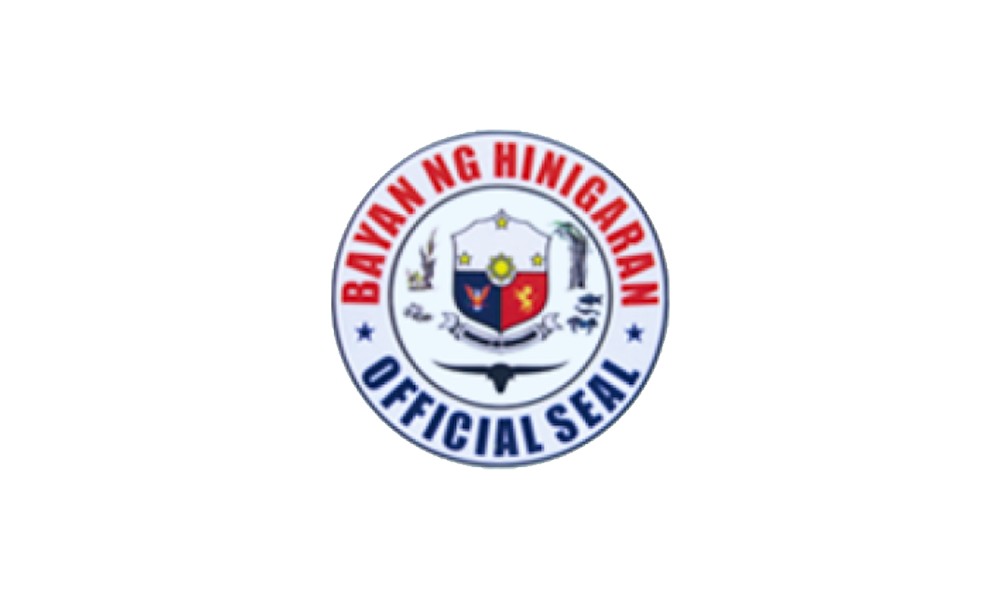
- Flag
- Nicknames: "The Oyster and Pyrotechnics Capital of Negros Occidental" "Center of Economic Development by 2030"
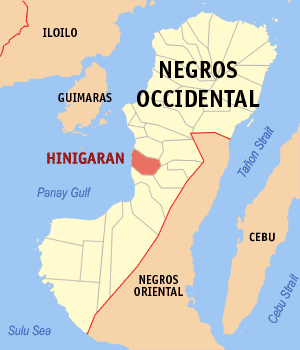
- Map of Negros Occidental with Hinigaran highlighted
- Interactive map of Hinigaran
- Location within the Philippines
- Coordinates: 10°16′N 122°51′E
- Country: Philippines
- Region: Negros Island Region
- Province: Negros Occidental
- District: 5th district
- Founded: 1768
- Barangays: 24 (see Barangays)

Government
  - Type: Sangguniang Bayan
  - Mayor: Mary Grace S. Arceo (NPC)
  - Vice Mayor: Jose Nadie P. Arceo (NPC)
  - Representative: Emilio Bernardino L. Yulo III (Lakas)
  - Municipal Council: Members: Paul Christopher L. Yulo; Narciso Martini P. Gayares III; Allain Joy M. Lopez; Maria Xenia Angela T. Guanco; Don Angelo Emil F. Colmenares; Jafet John M. Jong; Edmund P. Arceo; Steven P. Pineda; Freddie Mongcal ^{‡}; John Michael C. Mongcal ^{◌}; ‡ ex officio ABC president; ◌ ex officio SK chairman
  - Electorate: 55,682 voters (2025)

Area
  - Total: 154.92 km^{2} (59.81 sq mi)
- Elevation: 5.0 m (16.4 ft)
- Highest elevation: 43 m (141 ft)
- Lowest elevation: 0 m (0 ft)

Population (2024 census)
  - Total: 90,403
  - Density: 583.55/km^{2} (1,511.4/sq mi)
  - Households: 22,592
- Demonyms: Hiligaynon (Ilonggo): Hinigaranon (masculine) Hinigareno (feminine) Hinigarena

Economy
  - Income class: 1st municipal income class
  - Poverty incidence: 20.27% (2023)
  - Revenue: ₱ 417.1 million (2024)
  - Assets: ₱ 1,026 million (2024)
  - Expenditure: ₱ 230.9 million (2024)
  - Liabilities: ₱ 420.5 million (2024)

Service provider
  - Electricity: Negros Occidental Electric Cooperative (NOCECO)
  - Water: Hinigaran Municipal Water Enterprise
- Time zone: UTC+8 (PST)
- ZIP code: 6106
- PSGC: 064511000
- IDD : area code: +63 (0)34
- Languages: Hiligaynon; Tagalog; English
- Website: www.hinigaran.ph

Hinigaran, officially the Municipality of Hinigaran (Hiligaynon: Banwa sang Hinigaran; Tagalog: Bayan ng Hinigaran; Cebuano: Dakbayan sa Hinigaran, is a municipality in the province of Negros Occidental, Philippines. According to the 2024 census, it has a population of 90,403 people.

It is the fast-growing economy and development in the south-central part of Negros Occidental. Hinigaran envisioned itself to be the leading of top economic hub place for agri-tourism, commercial, industrial and education in the Fifth District. Hinigaran also be known as soon as the "Center of Economic Development by 2030".

Hinigaran is currently applying for Independent Component City (ICC).

== Etymology ==
The town's name is derived from the word higad and was originally recorded as "Ginigaran" by the Spaniards. The early settlers from Panay, known as Tagahigad, displaced the aboriginals called "Mundos" and "Ambaks" to the mountains. Over time, the name evolved in spelling and pronunciation to "Hinigaran."

An alternative legend suggests that the name originated from the Bisayan word Linigaran, which means "bypassed" or "skirted." Based on this account, during an eruption of Mount Kanlaon, a massive snake fled to the sea, bypassing the present-day Hinigaran, and became stranded at the mouth of the present-day Binalbagan River.

== History ==
The early inhabitants of the town were indigenous groups known as the “Mundos” and “Ambaks.” With the arrival of traders and settlers from Panay, many of the natives were displaced and moved to the mountainous areas.

The town was founded in 1765, and Basilio Mongcal was appointed as its first municipal president in 1806. Among the early settlers were the families of Mongcal, Lagtapon, Curio, Sario, David, Orin, Pido, Pabalinas, Luntayao, Javier, Vargas, Lucasan, Grijaldo, and Dano-og, some of whom also originated from Panay.

During the Spanish period, the seat of the pueblo was established along Jacinto and Zamora Streets. The town was administered by officials such as capitanes municipales, tenientes absolutas, and cabezas de barangay. When the revolt against Spanish rule broke out, Bibiano Gelvosa and his followers resisted Spanish forces. He served as the last capitan municipal before the arrival of the Americans.

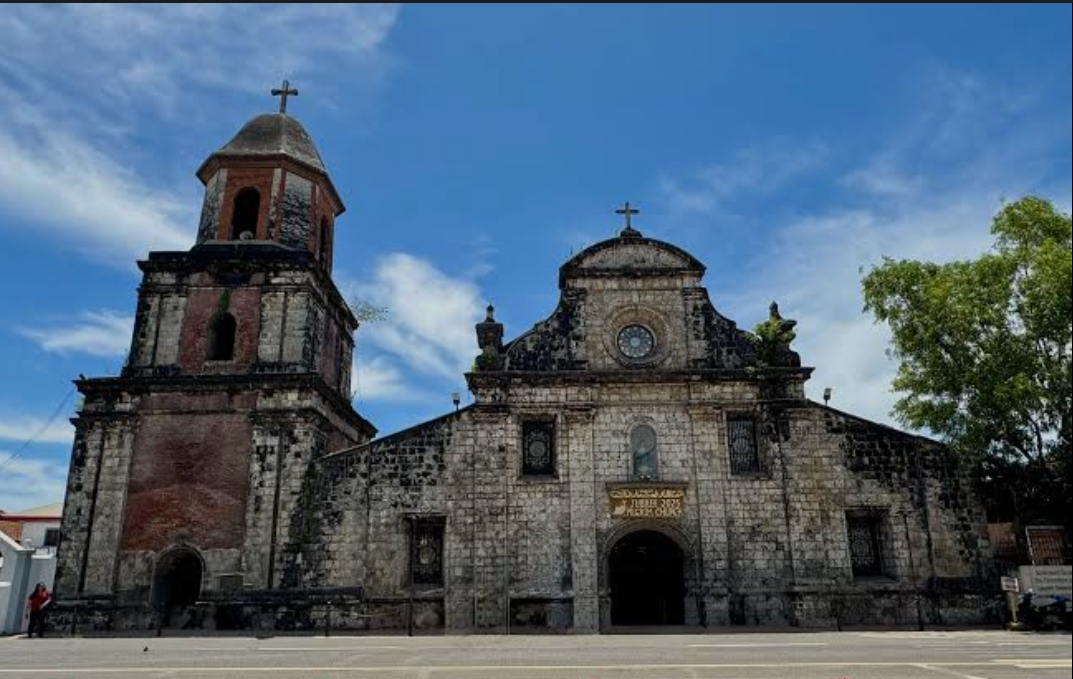
Sta. Maria Magdalena Parish Church, Hinigaran

One of the most imposing and beautiful structures in Hinigaran is the St. Mary Magdalene Parish Church. Established in 1848, the church is considered as one of the oldest churches in the country and is one of the lasting legacies of the early missionaries and residents of this historic town.

It was in early 1800s when Spanish missionaries came to Hinigaran to evangelize and serve the spiritual needs of the residents here. Then, in 1848, Reverend Father Jose Maria Pavon an Augustinian Priest from Spain, was commissioned to set up the parish of Hinigaran. Back then, there was no physical structure where priests can celebrate the Holy Mass and so, on November 4, 1848, Fr. Pavon built a temporary church made of “nipa,” a palm tree with creeping roots, characteristic of mangrove swamps in India and the Pacific islands, which abundantly grows in various swampy areas in Hinigaran. Several years later, under the joint efforts of Parish Priests Fr. Jose Ma. Martinez in 1854, and Fr. Francisco Ayarra in 1868 and the residents of Hinigaran, a more permanent structure was built.

The architectural concept of the church was based upon the designs of European churches which is very much common during that era. As the usual engineering practice during that time, the façade and walls of the church were made from a composition of stones, corals and bricks, some of which came from the nearby island of Guimaras. The pillars used came from nearby places like Paticui and as far as the island of Palawan, which were then transported to a place known today as Quincihan derived from the wages of the laborers of fifteen centavos every fifteen days.

As for the workforce that will actually build the church, the residents of the town were required to render the equivalent of fifteen days free labor every month, and among their daily tasks was to bring twenty-five eggs a day which were mixed with lime, coral and bricks that will form the foundation and walls of the church.

When it was finished, the desire of the parish priests of having a semi-baroque, yet simplified architectural style, was achieved. An antique image of St. Mary Magdalene, which was brought from Spain by early missionaries, was placed at the top of the main doorway where it still stands and can be viewed to this time.

The last Recollect parish priest assigned in Hinigaran was Fr. Melchor Ardanaz in June 1897 until December 1898. When the Revolution broke out in 1898, the Recollects left Hinigaran and never returned.

The secular clergy took over the administration in 1898 and later the Mill Hill fathers from 1907 until 1914. From then on, the parish was administered by secular clergy of the Diocese of Bacolod.

The structure of the St. Mary Magdalene Parish Church, as well as the antique religious statues and items within it, are considered cultural treasures of Hinigaran and the province of Negros Occidental. It is regarded as a heritage of the 18th century during the time of Spanish colonial churches during that era.

This is one of the Spanish colonial churches in Negros considered as a cultural treasure of the prestigious heritage of the 18th century during the Spanish Era.

== Geography ==
Hinigaran is 52 kilometres (32 mi) south from Bacolod and 163 kilometres (101 mi) from Dumaguete.

=== Barangays ===
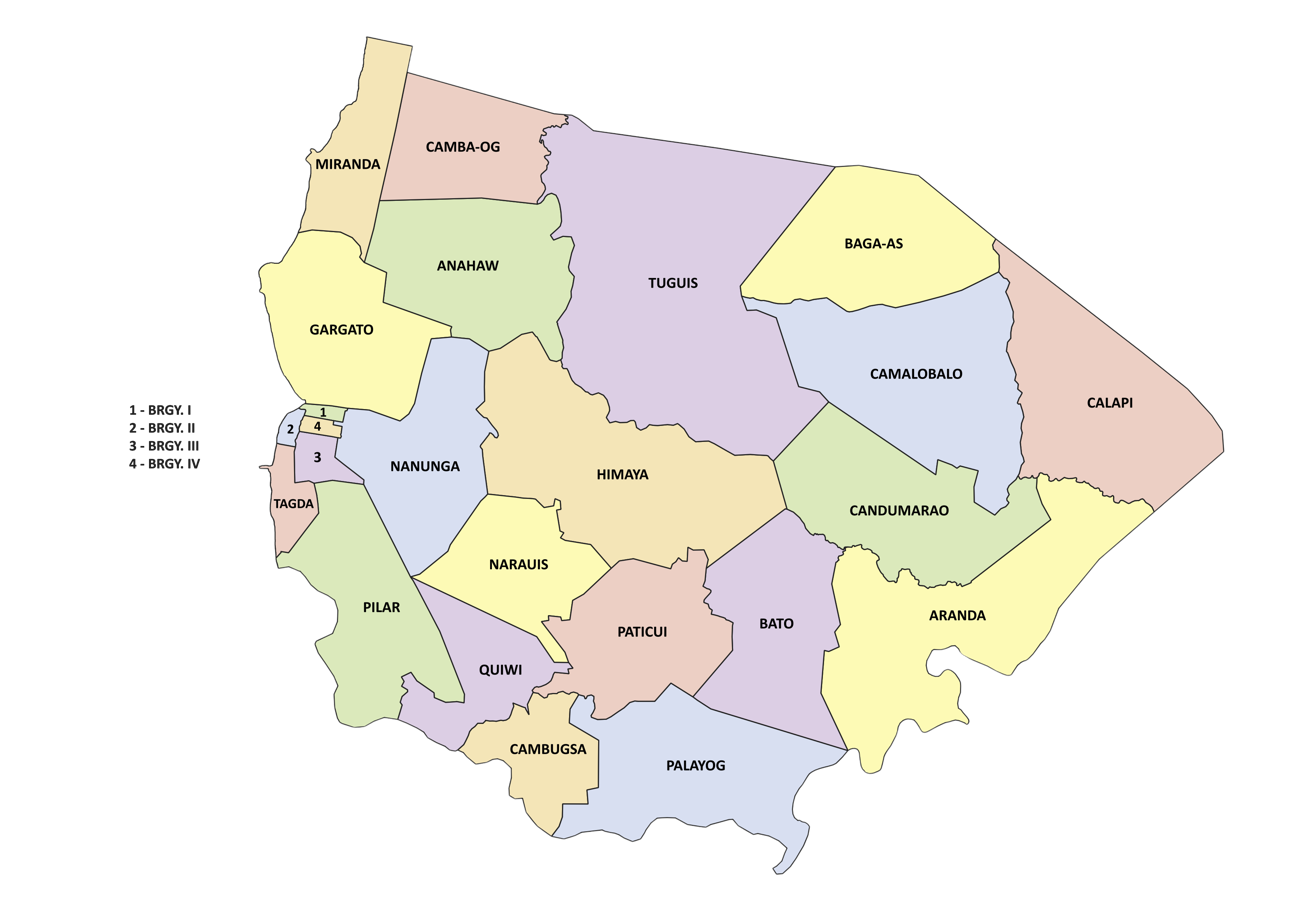
Political map of Hinigaran

Hinigaran is politically subdivided into 24 barangays. Each barangay consists of puroks and some have sitios.

- Anahaw
- Aranda
- Baga-as
- Barangay I (Poblacion)
- Barangay II (Poblacion)
- Barangay III (Poblacion)
- Barangay IV (Poblacion)
- Bato
- Calapi
- Camalobalo
- Camba-og
- Cambugsa
- Candumarao
- Gargato
- Himaya
- Miranda
- Nanunga
- Narauis
- Palayog
- Paticui
- Pilar
- Quiwi
- Tagda
- Tuguis

=== Climate ===
Climate data for Hinigaran, Negros Occidental
Month	Jan	Feb	Mar	Apr	May	Jun	Jul	Aug	Sep	Oct	Nov	Dec	Year
Mean daily maximum °C (°F)	30 (86)	31 (88)	32 (90)	33 (91)	32 (90)	30 (86)	29 (84)	29 (84)	29 (84)	29 (84)	30 (86)	30 (86)	30 (87)
Mean daily minimum °C (°F)	22 (72)	22 (72)	22 (72)	24 (75)	25 (77)	25 (77)	25 (77)	25 (77)	24 (75)	24 (75)	23 (73)	23 (73)	24 (75)
Average precipitation mm (inches)	38 (1.5)	29 (1.1)	55 (2.2)	65 (2.6)	141 (5.6)	210 (8.3)	212 (8.3)	176 (6.9)	180 (7.1)	180 (7.1)	130 (5.1)	70 (2.8)	1,486 (58.6)
Average rainy days	9.0	7.2	11.1	13.5	25.6	28.4	28.9	27.3	26.9	27.7	21.8	13.8	241.2
Source: Meteoblue

== Demographics ==
Population census of Hinigaran
Year	Pop.	±% p.a.
1903	14,256	—
1918	16,097	+0.81%
1939	27,438	+2.57%
1948	29,017	+0.62%
1960	36,240	+1.87%
1970	46,010	+2.41%
1975	52,018	+2.49%
1980	54,717	+1.02%
1990	68,739	+2.31%
1995	71,519	+0.75%
2000	74,997	+1.02%
2007	80,528	+0.99%
2010	81,925	+0.63%
2015	85,602	+0.84%
2020	88,909	+0.80%
2024	90,403	+0.40%
Source: Philippine Statistics Authority

=== Languages ===
The people in the town speak Hiligaynon. Tagalog and English are generally understood.

== Economy ==
Poverty incidence of Hinigaran (%)

Source: Philippine Statistics Authority

Hinigaran is one of the major sources of income to boost the local economy of production in agriculture, fishing and manufacturing industry to produce the key products of firecrackers, oysters, capiz shells, bananas, rice, milkfish and, coconuts. Hinigaran has also one of the primary economic hub for commercial and retail chains included Mang Inasal, Dunkin', Mcdonald's, Prince Hypermart, Puregold, KJ Fairmart, Metro Retail Stores Group and Jollibee.

NutriHogs Corporation and CPF Philippines Food Corporation the first agri-industrial hub in Hinigaran and the province of Negros Occidental and it is also known now as the largest facility in the Philippines. It is a 100 hectare land with 12,000 Sow-Level Modern Breeder Farm located in Sitio Alambre, Barangay Tuguis, Hinigaran. This modern facility aimed to produce 35 million kilograms of pork annually for the province to combines advanced, eco-friendly technology and enhance food security.

== Infrastructures ==
Hinugyaw Inn a three (3) storey building hotel with 24 rooms fully airconditioned and function hall, owned and operated by the local government of Hinigaran could boost the local economy and town's tourism industry in the southern negros.

- Ramon Magsaysay Boulevard also known simply as Magsaysay Boulevard is currently underconstruction and formerly as Hinigaran Seaside Boulevard, It is a two lane divided roadway that travels northwest and southwest from Brgy. 1 Old Reclamation, Brgy. 2 Tugbungan, Brgy. Tagda to Brgy. Pilar.

== Landmarks ==
Hinigaran Public Plaza it is the historic and civic center of Hinigaran, Negros Occidental. It serves as an open communal space for recreation and a focal point for the town's local heritage, christmas lights'on, hosting festivals and community gatherings.

Sta. Maria Magdalena Parish

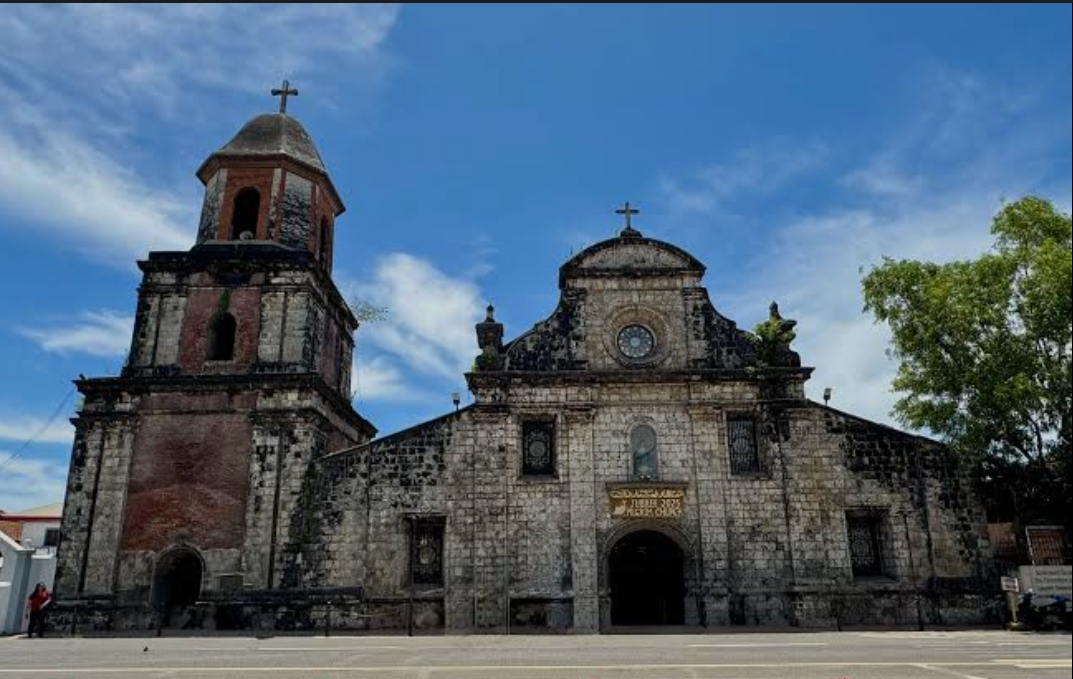
Sta. Maria Magdalena Parish Church, Hinigaran

== Cultures ==
is renowned for its fresh, mildly sweet buko pie with a soft, non-starchy filling.

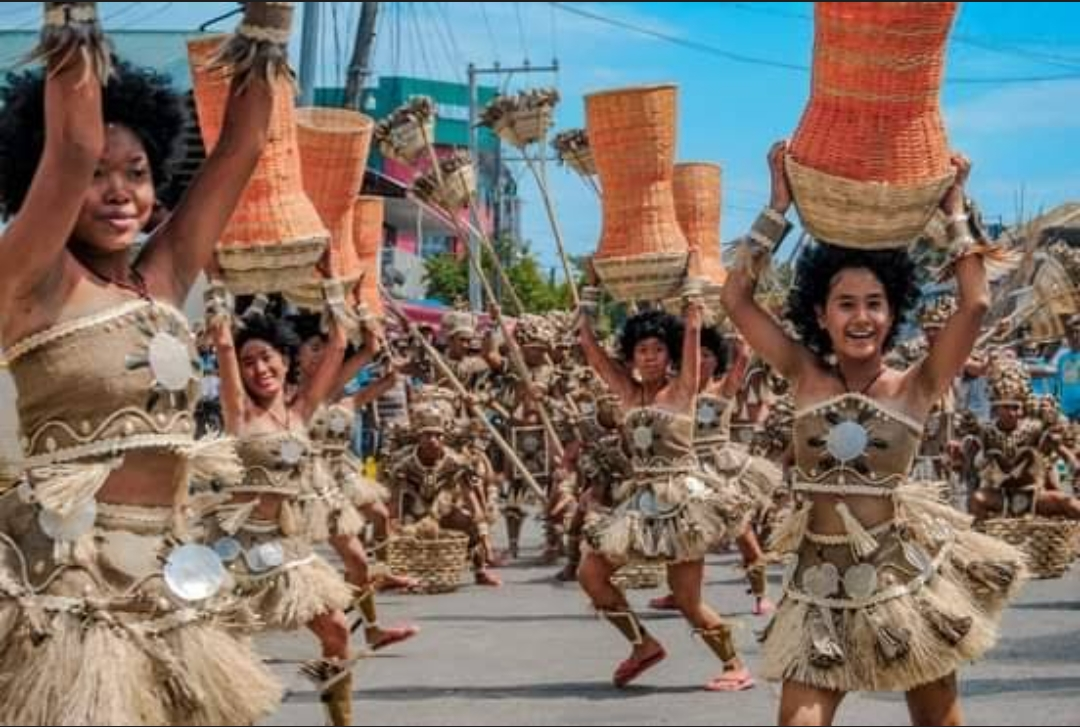
Hinugyaw Festival Hinigaran

This week-long festivity showcases the town’s dynamic cultural identity through street dancing, beauty pageants, culinary fairs, and community-led activities that reflect the unity and creativity of its people. This festival was held every year of the last week of the month of April.

== Healthcare ==
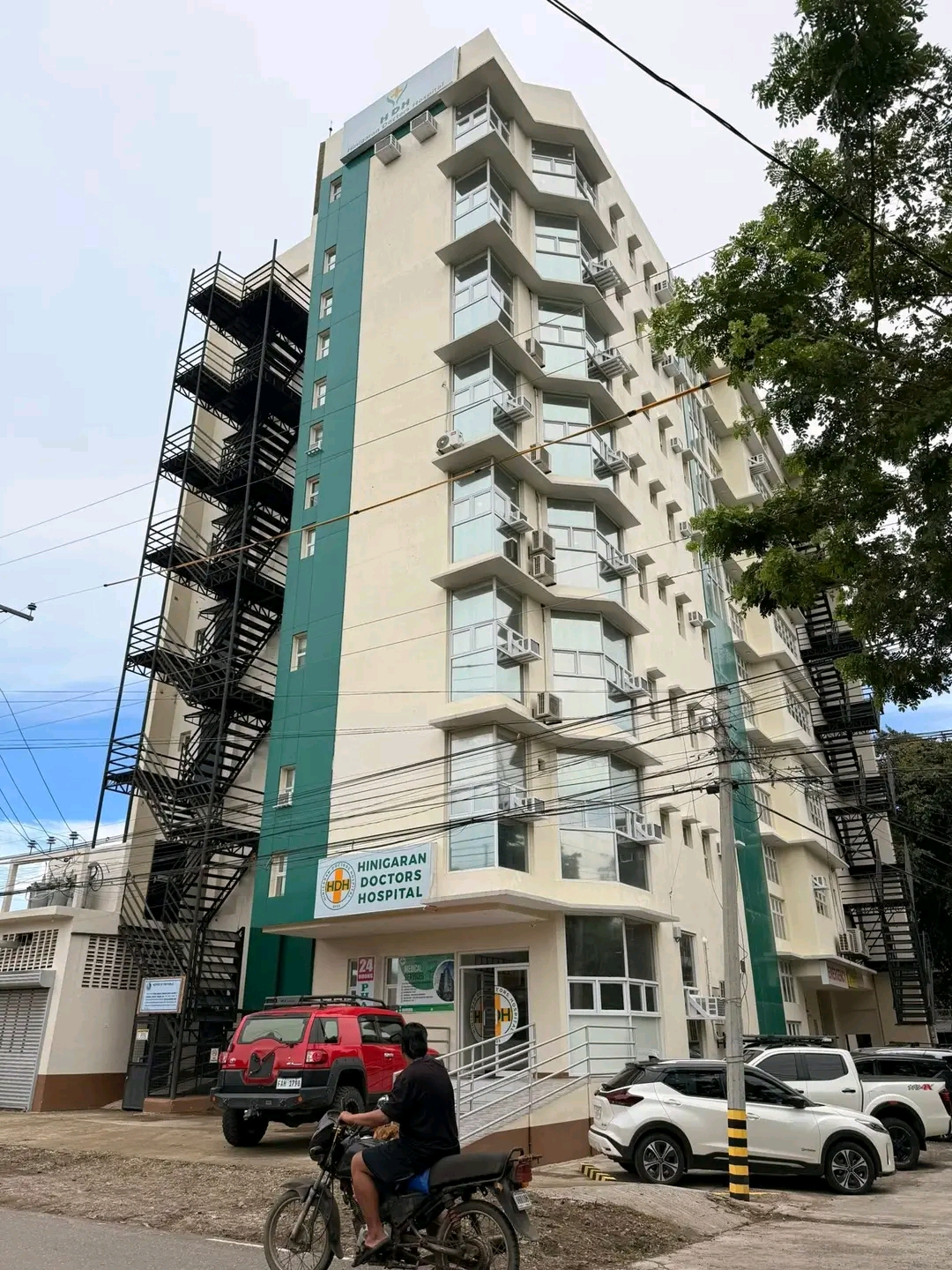
Hinigaran Doctors Hospital Incorporated

Corner M.H. Del Pilar-Luna Street, Brgy. III poblacion, Hinigaran. Sen. Espiridion Guanco Northdrive Avenue, Acacia, Brgy. Gargato, Hinigaran.

Hinigaran has only one government hospital that provide quality healthcare services which is Hinigaran Medical Hospital. The Hinigaran Municipal Health Office is responsible for the implementation and planning of the health care programs provided by the municipal government, which also operates and supervises Health Centers in the barangays of the municipality. Private hospitals in Hinigaran are fully operational in 2025 namely the Hinigaran Doctors' Hospital Incorporated and Holy Mother of Mercy Hospital Hinigaran. Upcoming the Negros South Provincial Hospital.

== Media ==
=== FM radio stations ===
- 105.7 Radyo Natin Hinigaran
- 104.9 5K Broadcasting Network Hinigaran
- 107.9 Life Radio Hinigaran

== Education ==
Hinigaran has only one university that offered a several programs. Currently, as sanctioned by the Department of Education, all primary and secondary institutions in the municipality use the K-12 and the MATATAG educational system.

- 27 elementary schools and 7 secondary schools, both public & private schools
- Negros Occidental National Agro-Industrial School Of Home Industries (1969)
- Esteban Jalandoni Farm School Baga-as and Calapi Extension (1991)
- Hinigaran Fundamental Baptist Christian School (1983)
- Hinigaran National High School (1946)
- Pahilanga National High School
- Hinigaran Institute (1922)
- Madeleine Academy (1919)
- Herman Harrell Horne School
- Hinigaran Adventist School
- Maranatha Christian Academy
- Central Philippines State University Hinigaran Campus (2011), the municipality's lone tertiary school.
- Hinigaran Central Colleges, the first local community college, public and coeducational higher education institution in the southern negros to be offered programs in the field of science and technology, education, agriculture and fisheries.

== Notable personalities ==
- Espiridion Guanco – first President pro tempore of the Senate of the Philippines and Secretary to Senate President Manuel L. Quezon
- Gil Montilla - 9th Governor of Negros Occidental,Senator of the Philippines, 4th Speaker of the House of Representatives of the Philippines
- Remy Presas - Martial artist, Founder of modern Arnis
- Mariano Yulo – 6th Governor of Negros Occidental,Senator of the Philippines from 1925 to 1929
- Vicente Lim - a Filipino Brigadier General and World War II hero from 1888 to 1944
- Lieutenant Eduardo Siguenza Baumann a Hinigaranon PMA Cadet and a Commander of group of guilliras that ambushed a japanese patrol in Barangay Narauis.

== Sister Cities ==
Local
San Juan City, Metro Manila
