= Iggy Arroyo =

Filipino politician (1950–2012)

The Honorable Ignacio Arroyo Jr.
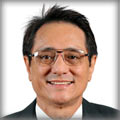
- Official portrait, 2010

Member of the Philippine House of Representatives from Negros Occidental's 5th congressional district
- In office June 30, 2004 – January 26, 2012
- Preceded by: Jose Apolinario Lozada
- Succeeded by: Alejandro Mirasol

Personal details
- Born: Ignacio Tuason Arroyo Jr. October 24, 1950 Quezon City, Philippines
- Died: January 26, 2012 (aged 61) London, England
- Resting place: Manila North Cemetery
- Party: Lakas (2007–2012)
- Other political affiliations: KAMPI (2004–2007)
- Spouses: Marilyn Jacinto (annulled); Alicia Rita "Aleli" Morales-Arroyo (estranged)
- Domestic partner: Mary Grace Ibuna (until his death)
- Relations: Jose Miguel Arroyo (brother); Marilou Arroyo-Lesaca (sister); Paolo Tantoco (son-in-law)
- Children: Bernardina Arroyo-de Tantoco; Bianca Arroyo; Alelu Arroyo
- Profession: Politician
- Website: Iggy Arroyo
- Nickname: "Jose Pidal"

Ignacio Tuason Arroyo Jr. (Tagalog pronunciation: [ɐˈɾɔjɔ]; October 24, 1950 – January 26, 2012), also known as Iggy Arroyo, was a Filipino politician. He was a member of the Philippine House of Representatives representing the Fifth District of Negros Occidental from 2004 until 2012. He is the brother of former First Gentleman, Jose Miguel Arroyo.

== Early life ==
He was born on October 24, 1950, in Quezon City to Ignacio Lacson Arroyo Sr., and Lourdes Tuason Arroyo. His siblings include former Philippine First Gentleman Jose Miguel Tuason Arroyo and former congresswoman Ma. Lourdes Arroyo Lesaca.

His early education began in Ateneo de Manila University in Quezon City. He finished High School in 1969 at Villanova Preparatory High School in Ojai, California, USA and he took his preparatory course in Menlo College in Palo Alto, California then he went on to pursue his Bachelor of Science in Business Administration degree, Major in Finance at the University of San Francisco, California, USA where he graduated in 1974.

Arroyo had daughters named Bernardina Arroyo Tantoco and Bianca Jacinto Arroyo from his first wife Marilyn Jacinto. He was married to his second wife Alicia "Aleli" Morales and is father to Alelu Morales Arroyo.

== Career ==
Congressman Ignacio Tuason Arroyo Jr. was elected as Congressman during his first try in politics in 2004 and in 2007, he was again chosen by his constituents in the 5th District of Negros Occidental. During the 13th Congress, he became the Vice-Chairman of the House Committees on Agriculture and Appropriations and Member of other various Committees. He is presently the Chairman of the House Committee on Environment and Natural Resources, Vice-Chairman of the House Committee on Government Reorganization and Member of other various Committees.

Prior to his election as Representative of the 5th District of Negros Occidental, he was a Board Member of the Philippine Producers Corporation (PHILPROCOM) in Bacolod City as well as the Planters Association of Negros Occidental.

He has proposed an act to promote environmental awareness through environmental education, which was signed into law as Republic Act No. 9512 otherwise known as the National Environmental Awareness and Education Act of 2008. He authored the Philippine Climate Change Act of 2008, which created the Climate Change Commission.

Among other significant bills, he has authored acts on increasing the salary grades of public school teachers, Seafarers Act of 2008, giving scholarship to the youth engaged in agriculture, instituting the children's welfare funds for the protection and rehabilitation of abandoned, abused and sexually exploited children, the anti-child pornography act, Magna Carta for Day Care workers, establishing drug rehabilitation in every region in the country and granting incentives and benefits to rural health workers.

== Education ==
- Bachelor of Science in Business Administration, Major in Finance University of San Francisco, California, United States
  - Year Graduated: 1974
- Villanova Preparatory High School, Ojai, California, United States
  - Year Graduated: 1969
- Ateneo de Manila University, Quezon City
  - Year Graduated: 1965

== Ancestry ==
Ancestors of Iggy Arroyo

16. Pedro Arroyo
8. Ignacio Arroyo y Lacson
17. Apolonia Petronila Lacson
4. José María Lacson Arroyo y Pidal
18. Melquiades Pidal
9. Maria Pidal y Regalado
19. Luisa Regalado
2. Ignacio Arroyo Pidal y Lacson
20. Lucio Lacson y Petronila
10. Aniceto Lacson y Ledesma
21. Clara Ledesma y Zunico
5. Jesusa Lacson y Araneta
22. Patricio Araneta y Cabunsol
11. Rosario Araneta y Emilio
23. Leonicia Emilio
1. Ignacio Tuason Arroyo Jr.
6. Demetrio Tuason y de la Paz
3. Lourdes Tuason y Zaragoza
7. Natividad Zaragoza y Roxas

== Death ==
Early on January 26, 2012, his brother Mike Arroyo announced that Iggy died before afternoon Philippine Standard Time (PST). With this, the Philippine flag in Batasan Pambansa was later put to half-mast. However, the chief of staff of Iggy Arroyo later released an advisory that he is not dead but he is currently under life support and declared "brain dead", or clinically dead. And they later rolled up the Philippine flag after two hours at half-mast. On the evening of that day, 6pm PST it was announced that the 5th representative of Negros Occidental representative Iggy Arroyo had died because the life support was already removed. This was confirmed by his brother and his chief of staff who received the message from loved ones of Iggy Arroyo from London. Arroyo was survived by girlfriend and live-in partner Grace Ibuna. It can be remembered that Iggy went to London late last year to seek treatment for liver ailment.
