= Dino Yulo =

Filipino lawyer and politician

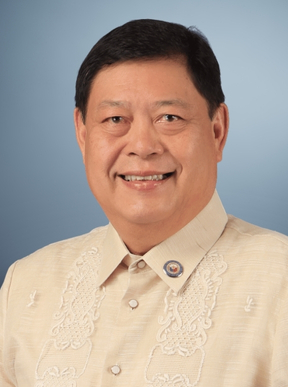
- Official portrait, 2025

Member of the House of Representatives from Negros Occidental's 5th District
- Incumbent
- Assumed office June 30, 2022
- Preceded by: Marilou Arroyo-Lesaca

Vice Governor of Negros Occidental
- In office May 14, 2008 – June 30, 2010; Acting
- Governor: Isidro Zayco
- Preceded by: Isidro Zayco
- Succeeded by: Genaro Alvarez

Member of the Negros Occidental Provincial Board from the 5th District
- In office June 30, 2004 – June 30, 2013

Personal details
- Born: Emilio Bernardino Lim Yulo III; May 20, 1963 (age 63)
- Party: Lakas (2024–present)
- Other political affiliations: Independent (2004–2007; 2021–2024); Nacionalista (2009–2021); KAMPI (2007–2009)

Emilio Bernardino "Dino" Lim Yulo III (born May 20, 1963) is a Filipino lawyer and politician who was a member of the House of Representatives. He has represented Negros Occidental's 5th congressional district since 2022.

== See also ==
- 19th Congress of the Philippines
- 20th Congress of the Philippines

House of Representatives of the Philippines
Preceded by Marilou Arroyo-Lesaca	Member of the House of Representatives from Negros Occidental's 5th district 2022–present	Incumbent
