= Lin-ay sang Negros 2012 =

- Date: April 13, 2012
- Venue: Pana-ad Stadium, Bacolod, Negros Occidental, Philippines
- Entrants: 24
- Winner: Alyssa Villarico; Bacolod

Lin-ay sang Negros 2012, the 18th edition of the annual Lin-ay sang Negros pageant was held on April 13, 2012 at

the Pana-ad Stadium. A total of 13 cities and municipalities sent their representatives. Ann Marie Malayo of Hinoba-an, crowned her successor, Mass Communication student Alyssa Marie E. Villarico of Bacolod City, at the end of the event.

== Final results ==
Placement	Contestant
Lin-ay sang Negros 2012	Bacolod – Alyssa Marie E. Villarico
1st Runner-up	Victorias – Jemaimah N. Taladico
2nd Runner-up	Talisay – Sherizze Sean C. Acot
Top 5	Manapla – Patricia Anne Reconquista; Hinoba-an – Kristy Claire Ebreo
Top 10	Bago - Catherine Joy Marin; Murcia – Chinky Cantere; Sagay - Marjoelyn B. Rebadomia; San Carlos - Damaris Vi T. Landao; Silay - Cel Marie Lachica

== Corporate Awards ==
Special Award	Winner	Name
Miss EDC	Bacolod City	Alyssa Marie E. Villarico
Miss 2GO Travel	Himamaylan	Precious Grace V. Heradura
Miss 2GO Freight	Bago City	Catherine Joy Marin
Miss New Placenta	Manapla	Patricia Anne A. Reconquista
Miss Olive C	Murcia	Chinky A. Cantere
Miss Sunstar Reader's Choice	Silay City	Cel Marie A. Lachica
Miss Globe	Bacolod City	Alyssa Marie E. Villarico
Miss Air Phil. Express	Kabankalan City	Vaness Marie G. Oyos
Miss Watchmen Reader's Choice	Talisay City	Sherizze Sean C. Acot
Miss Camisa	Bago City	Catherine Joy Marin
Miss Mary Kay	Bacolod City	Alyssa Marie E. Villarico
Miss ASN People's Choice	Bacolod	Alyssa Marie E. Villarico
Miss Del Monte Fit 'n Right	Talisay City	Sherizze Sean C. Acot
Miss Silka	Murcia	Chinky A. Cantere
Miss Kapuso	Bago City	Catherine Joy Marin
Miss Dermaline	Bago City	Catherine Joy Marin
Miss Coca-Cola	Silay City	Cel Marie A. Lachica
Miss Island Living Channel	Bago City	Catherine Joy Marin

== Special awards ==
Special Award	Winner	Name
Best in Festival Costume	San Carlos City	Damaris Vi T. Landao
Best Festival Costume Designer	Talisay City	Sherizze Sean C. Acot
Best in Swimsuit	Bago City	Catherine Joy Marin
Miss Photogenic	La Castellana	Karla O. Ape
Best in Evening Gown	Bago City	Catherine Joy Marin
Miss Congeniality	Hinobaan	Kristy Claire S. Ebreo
Lin-ay nga Abilidadan	Bago City	Catherine Joy Marin
Best Evening Gown Designer	John-john Ditching	

== Contestants ==
City/Municipality	Contestant
Bacolod	Alyssa Marie E. Villarico
Bago	Catherine Joy F. Marin
Binalbagan	Lea Grace G. Jardinico
Cadiz	Jennybeb E. Bedelo
Cauayan	Shara A. Villaflor
Don Salvador Benedicto	Rita Dayanara V. Alla
Enrique B. Magalona	Rose Ann Mae J. Diaz
Escalante	Cristy Mae Q. Mendoza
Himamaylan	Precious Grace V. Heradura
Hinigaran	Cherry Ann M. Magarse
Hinoba-an	Kristy Claire S. Ebreo
Ilog	Jan Camille Y. Albito
Isabela	Christ'l C. Garrido
Kabankalan	Vaness Marie G. Oyos
La Carlota	Twinkle B. Fernandez
La Castellana	Karla O. Ape
Manapla	Patricia Anne A. Reconquista
Murcia	Chinky A. Cantere
Sagay	Marjoelyn B. Rebadomia
San Carlos	Damaris Vi T. Landao
Silay	Cel Marie A. Lachica
Sipalay	Keulani Marie J. Dizon
Talisay	Sherizze Sean C. Acot
Victorias	Jemaimah N. Taladico

== Other Pageant Notes ==
=== Historical significance ===
- Bacolod City won its 3rd Lin-ay sang Negros title.
- Bacolod City, Talisay City, Victorias City, Silay City, San Carlos City and Hinoba-an also placed in last year's pageant
- Bacolod City also placed Top 3 in last year's pageant.

=== Withdrawal and Replacement ===
- Alyssa Villarico was 2012 Masskara Festival Queen, 2nd Runner Up. Alexis Danica Drilon, the winner decided not to represent the city because of her academic commitments. Two years after, she went on to represent the city and adjudged Lin-ay sang Negros 2014.

=== Panel of Judges ===
- Leonilo Agustin - Department of Tourism Consultant
- Vicky Marie Milagrosa Rushton - 2009 Lin-ay sang Negros and 2011 Mutya ng Pilipinas International
- Helen Nicolette Henson - 2011 Miss World-Philippines 1st Princess
- Raphael Kieffer - Model
- Blance Marie Brown - 2004 Lin-ay sang Negros

=== Hosts ===
- Binibining Pilipinas-World 2006 Ann Mariz Igpit
- GMA star Victor Aliwalas
