= Lin-ay sang Negros 2019 =

- Date: April 12, 2019
- Presenters: Patricia Tumulak, Adrian Bobe
- Entertainment: Kristoffer Martin
- Venue: Panaad Stadium, Bacolod, Negros Occidental, Philippines
- Entrants: 26
- Returns: Escalante, La Carlota, Pontevedra, Salvador Benedicto
- Winner: Roxanne Toleco; Talisay

Lin-ay sang Negros 2019, the 25th edition of the annual Lin-ay sang Negros was held on April 12, 2019, at the Pana-ad Park and Stadium. A total of 26 candidates from 12 cities and 14 municipalities sent their representatives. Talisay City's Roxanne Toleco was crowned by Danice Decolongon Lin-ay sang Negros 2018 winner from the municipality of Ilog at the end of the event.

== Final results ==
Final Result	Contestant
Lin-ay sang Negros 2019*	Talisay - Roxanne Toleco
1st Runner-Up	Sagay - Jarizz Borcelas
2nd Runner Up	Hinoba-an - Leila Jules Sarino
Top 5	San Carlos - Ma Rita Sol Requieron; Pontevedra- Chaira Victoria Juarez
Top 12	Cauayan- Eunice Mejica; Isabela - Helcie Jamili; Hinigaran - Weny Joy Azuelo; La Carlota - Jan Marie Bordon; Murcia- Ma. Avedale Berondo; Silay - Shaira Dorilag; Victorias - Ma. Vachel Anna Ramos

* - She also automatically competed in Eat Bulaga's Miss Millennial Philippines 2019.

== Special awards ==
Special Award	Winner	Name
Miss Congeniality	San Enrique	Janine Bautista
Best in Festival Costume	Murcia	Ma. Avedale Berondo
Muse of the Media - North	Talisay	Roxanne Toleco
Muse of the Media - South	Hinoba-an	Leila Jules Sarino
Miss Photogenic	Talisay	Roxanne Toleco
Miss GMA Kapuso	Sagay City	Jarizz Borcelas
Lin-ay sang Organik nga Negros	Talisay	Roxanne Toleco
Lin-ay nga Abilidadan	Hinoba-an	Leila Jules Sarino
People's Choice Awardee	Sagay City	Jarizz Borcelas
Best in Swimwear	Sagay City	Jarizz Borcelas
Best In Evening Gown	Talisay	Roxanne Toleco
Best Evening Gown Designer	Bacolod	Edwin Benitez

== Contestants ==
Contestant	Name	Age
Bacolod City	Joana Angelica E. Ortillo	18
Bago City	Kryztstar Angel P. Gustilo	18
Binalbagan	Judy Mae Garcia	19
Cadiz	Jasline S. Batiller	18
Candoni	Gwyneth Avigail B. Lambot	16
Cauayan	Eunice N. Mejica	17
Don Salvador Benedicto	Jhudiel Micha L. Lianda	17
E.B. Magalona	Red Marie A. Jimena	17
Escalante	Deanne Marie M. Buenavista	21
Hinigaran	Weny Joy Azuelo	16
Hinoba-an	Leila Jules A. Sarino	20
Isabela	Helcie S. Jamili	18
Kabankalan	Patricia Louise R. Zayco	18
La Carlota	Jan Marie Bordon	18
La Castellana	Mary Louise L. Delacruz	21
Moises Padilla	Mheralyn P. Balenario	17
Murcia	Ma. Avedale R. Berondo	18
Pontevedra	Chaira Victoria M. Juarez	18
Sagay	Jarizz Borcelas	18
San Carlos	Ma. Rita Sol S. Requieron	18
San Enrique	Angelica Janine Bautista	18
Silay	Shaira B. Dorilag	20
Sipalay	Jonnabelle Hilary A. Lara	17
Talisay	Roxanne L. Toleco	19
Toboso	Gene Warmae C. Gascon	17
Victorias	Ma. Vachel Anna B. Ramos	20

== Performances ==
- Kristofer Martin

== Panel of Judges ==
- Jojo Bragais- Designer
- Maureen Wroblewitz - Asia's Next Top Model Winner
- Tom Ramos
- Cathrene Stanzon
- Ryan Agoncillo - Actor
- Maria Lopez - Lin-ay sang Negros 1994 Winner
