= Lin-ay sang Negros =

Beauty contest

- Type: Women's beauty pageant
- Headquarters: Negros Occidental, Philippines
- First edition: 1994
- Most recent edition: 2026
- Current titleholder: Jamaicah Bantigue; Don Salvador Benedicto

Lin-ay sang Negros (transl. Lady of Negros) is a local beauty pageant in Negros Occidental, Philippines. Started in 1994, it is the highlight of a week-long celebration called Panaad sa Negros Festival.

== Winners ==
Year	City / municipality	Lin-ay sang Negros	Number of candidates	Date
1994	Himamaylan	Beatrice Lopez		May 31, 1994
1995	No pageant held			
1996	Hinigaran	Maita Enteria		
1997	Sagay	Jennifer Legaspi		
1998	Hinoba-an	Jerene Vinco		
1999	La Castellana	Wilva Ann Cadianza		
2000	Victorias	Ma. Victoria Durana		
2001	Silay	Liezl Belonio		
2002	San Enrique	Richie Mediavilla		
2003	Murcia	Sharon Mallorca		
2004	Hinoba-an	Blanche Marie Brown		
2005	Sagay	Riza Liz Catigan		
2006	Bacolod	Jan Nicole Puentebella		
2007	Bacolod	Christer Mari Taclobos	23	April 20, 2007
2008	Hinigaran	Karlyn May Bautista	24	
2009	Talisay	Vickie Marie Milagrosa Rushton	24	April 24, 2009
2010	Silay	Kareen Ty		March 26, 2010
2011	Hinoba-an	Ann Marie Malayo	24	April 9, 2011
2012	Bacolod	Allysa Villarico	24	April 13, 2012
2013	Bacolod	Samyah Al-Dossary		April 12, 2013
2014	Bacolod	Alexis Danica Drilon	22	April 4, 2014
2015	San Carlos	Jessica Zevenbergen		April 17, 2015
2016	Victorias	Alyssa Louise Erika Tia Jimenea	23	April 18, 2016
2017	Bago	Angelika Esther Portugaleza	24	April 28, 2017
2018	Ilog	Danice Decolongon	27	April 20, 2018
2019	Talisay	Roxanne Toleco	26	April 12, 2019
2020	No pageant due to Covid-19			
2021	No pageant due to Covid-19			
2022	No pageant due to Covid-19			
2023	Cauayan	Alliah Janine Al Rashid	27	April 21, 2023
2024	Victorias	Kyla Rose Romarate	29	April 19, 2024
2025	Victorias	Jada Biaxyl Celeste	27	March 28, 2025
2026	Don Salvador Benedicto	Jamaicah Bantigue	32	April 18, 2026

=== By number of wins ===
City/Municipality	Number of wins	Winning years
Bacolod	5	2006, 2007, 2012, 2013, 2014
Victorias	4	2000, 2016, 2024, 2025
Hinoba-an	3	1998, 2004, 2011
Talisay	2	2009, 2019
Sagay	2	1997, 2005
Silay	2	2001, 2010
Hinigaran	2	1996, 2008
Don Salvador Benedicto	1	2026
Cauayan	1	2023
Ilog	1	2018
Bago	1	2017
San Carlos	1	2015
Murcia	1	2003
San Enrique	1	2002
La Castellana	1	1999
Himamaylan	1	1994

== Lin-ay's competing in national pageants ==
- Mimilannie Lisondra, Lin-ay sang Negros 1999 1st Runner-up joined Miss University International 2001 in New York, USA and was adjudged the winner. Later that year, she joined Mutya ng Pilipinas 2001 and placed 2nd runner-up.
- Lin-ay sang Negros 2002 Ma. Victoria Durana joined Miss Philippines Earth 2002 but was unplaced.
- Lin-ay sang Negros 2005 winner Riza Liz Catigan joined Binibining Pilipinas 2008 but was unplaced.
- Lin-ay sang Negros 2005 semifinalist Grezilda Ennis Simondo Adelantar joined Binibining Pilipinas 2007 but was also unplaced. In 2009, Adelantar joined Miss Philippines Earth 2009 and won the Miss Philippines Eco-tourism title.
- Kristine Alonso, Lin-ay sang Negros 2008 2nd runner-up joined Miss Philippines Earth 2010 as Miss Bacolod City but was unplaced. She was Top 10 for the Best in Talent category. In 2016 and 2017, she was handpicked by Carousel Productions to be one of the Team Operations Manager for the Miss Earth International pageant.
- Lin-ay sang Negros 2009 Vickie Marie Rushton joined Mutya ng Pilipinas 2011 and emerged the winner. As the Mutya ng Pilipinas 2011 winner, she was supposed to represent the Philippines to the Miss Intercontinental 2011 pageant in Alicante, Spain. However, because of the delay in the local pageant schedule, Kathleen Anne Po was handpicked by the organizer to represent. In 2018, Rushton joined Binibining Pilipinas and was adjudged Bb. First Runner Up.
- Alyssa Villarico, Lin-ay sang Negros 2012 joined Miss Philippines Earth 2013 but was unplaced. In 2015, one of her co-candidates, Catherine Joy Marin, joined Miss Philippines Earth 2015 and placed Miss Philippines Water.
- Lin-ay sang Negros 2015 Jessica Zevenbergen joined Miss Philippines Earth 2016 and placed in the semi-finals.
- Lin-ay Sang Negros 2017 Angelica Esther Portugaleza and Lin-ay Sang Negros 2019 Roxanne Toleco represented in their respective editions of Eat Bulaga's Miss Millennial Philippines in 2017 and 2019, respectively.
- Lin-ay sang Negros 2019 First Runner Up Jarizz Borcelas joined Miss Philippines Earth 2022 representing Sagay City. She made it to Top 8.
