= Lin-ay sang Negros 2018 =

Beauty pageant edition

- Date: April 20, 2018
- Presenters: Patricia Tumulak, Adrian Bobe
- Venue: Pana-ad Stadium, Bacolod, Negros Occidental, Philippines
- Entrants: 27
- Returns: E.B. Magalona, Himamaylan, La Castellana, Pulupandan, San Enrique
- Winner: Danice Decolongon; Ilog

Lin-ay sang Negros 2018, the 24th edition of the annual Lin-ay sang Negros was held on April 20, 2018 at the Pana-ad Park and Stadium. A total of 27 candidates from 11 cities and 16 municipalities sent their representatives. Ilog's Danice Decolongon was crowned by Lin-ay sang Negros 2017 winner from Bago Angelika Esther Portugaleza, and Lin-ay sang Negros 2009 winner Vickie Rushton at the end of the event. This pageant edition holds the record for having the most number of contestants.

== Final results ==
Final Result	Contestant
Lin-ay sang Negros 2018	Ilog - Danice Decolongon
1st Runner-Up	Toboso - Klaire Ann Libre
2nd Runner Up	Hinigaran - Yasmine Cabalfin
Top 10	Kabankalan - Nesa Mueller; Murcia - Lawrellie Cay Allen; San Carlos - Jimarie Lim; San Enrique - Rose Ann Niego; Bago - Marion Angel Dela Miñez; Cauayan - Le'Ann Marie Gayatin; Himamaylan - Milca Romares

== Contestants ==
Contestant	Name
Bacolod City	Krisley Sañor
Bago	Marion Angel Dela Miñez
Binalbagan	Kristilyn Del Prado
Cadiz	Meiele Polines
Calatrava	Ana Marie Sayat
Candoni	Glydel Geduriagao
Cauayan	Le'Ann Marie Gayatin
E.B. Magalona	Andrea Claire Balinas
Himamaylan	Milca Romares
Hinigaran	Yasmine Cabalfin
Hinoba-an	Krissel Crisostomo
Ilog	Danice Decolongon
Isabela	Kristelle Janne Sa-onoy
Kabankalan	Nesa Mueller
La Castellana	Jesette Pagsuguiron
Manapla	Joyce Cristal
Moises Padilla	Michelle Unabia
Murcia	Lawrellie Cay Allen
Pulupandan	Aira Doronila
Sagay	Daireen Dagatan
San Carlos	Jimarie Lim
San Enrique	Rose Ann Niego
Silay	Ronnielyn Jochico
Sipalay	Patricia Balbin
Talisay	Charlene Linga
Toboso	Klaire Ann Libre
Victorias	Kessia Angelic Bihag

== Special awards ==
Special Award	Winner	Name
Muse of the Media	Kabankalan	Gheneza Marie Mueller
Best in Festival Costume	Hinigaran	Yasmine Cabalfin
Miss GMA Kapuso	Hinigaran	Yasmine Cabalfin
People's Choice Awardee	Hinigaran	Yasmine Cabalfin
Best in Swimsuit	Toboso	Klaire Ann Libre
Miss Photogenic	Kabankalan	Gheneza Marie Mueller
Best in Evening Gown	Ilog	Danice Decolongon
Miss Congeniality	Binalbagan	Kristilyn Del Prado
Lin-ay nga Abilidadan	Sagay City	Daireen Mae Dagatan
Lin-ay sang Organic nga Negros	Sipalay	Patricia Balbin
Best Designer Award	Murcia	Lawrellie Cay Allen

== Hosts ==
- Patricia Tumulak
- Adrian Bobe

== Judges ==
Judge	Affiliation
Rolf Jost	
Don Mcgyver Cochico	
Vickie Rushton	Lin-ay sang Negros 2009, Mutya ng Pilipinas 2011
Jerene Vinco - Montelibano	Lin-ay sang Negros 1998
Rene Salud	

== Notes ==
- This is Ilog's first win.
