= Lin-ay sang Negros 2023 =

Local beauty pageant in Negros

- Date: April 21, 2023
- Venue: Pana-ad Stadium, Bacolod, Negros Occidental, Philippines
- Entrants: 27
- Withdrawals: Manapla, Pontevedra, San Carlos, San Enrique, Valladolid
- Winner: Alliah Janine Al Rashid; Cauayan

Lin-ay sang Negros 2023, the 26th edition of the annual Lin-ay sang Negros pageant held on April 21, 2023, at the Pana-ad Park and Stadium. A total of 27 candidates from 12 cities and 15 municipalities sent their representatives. Talisay City's Roxanne Toleco crowned her successor at the end of the event.

== Final results ==
Final Result	Contestant
Lin-ay sang Negros 2023	Cauayan - Alliah Janine Al Rashid
1st Runner-Up	Sagay City - Jasmine Claire Pesquera
2nd Runner Up	Don Salvador Benedicto - Ricah Alcorin
3rd Runner Up	Hinigaran - Ma. Xenia Angela Guanco
4th Runner Up	Kabankalan - Keziah Nicole White
Top 10	Cadiz City - Steppi Vanessa Felice Bacolado; La Carlota City - Janella Marie Avelino; Talisay City - Althea Nicole Gadingan; Silay City - Ina Marie Hengelmolen; Victorias City - Paola Nicole Reconquista

== Prepageant Challenges and Awards ==
Challenges	Results		Ref.
Muse of the Media	Winner	Himamaylan - Lyzabelle Blythe S. Villa	
Muse of the Media	Top 3	Murcia – Rebecca Gail Gerdon; Silay City – Ina Marie Hengelmolen	
Festival Costume	Top 3 Urban Legends	Bago - Chelyn Halpin; Calatrava - Givernie Anne Tomarong; Cauayan - Alliah Janine Al Rashid	
Festival Costume	Top 3 Myths and Deities	Kabankalan City - Keziah Nicole White; Pulupandan - Cristine Joy Gadiana; Sagay - Jasmine Claire Pesquera	

== Corporate Awards ==
Special Award	Winner	Name
Ms. Entrego	Cadiz	Steppi M. Bacolado
Ms. Robinsons Bacolod	Cadiz	Steppi M. Bacolado
Ms. Petron - Gasul Elite	Cauayan	Alliah Janine Al Rashid
Ms. EGY Travel and Tours	Kabankalan City	Keziah Nicole White
Ms. EGY Aesthetics	Cadiz	Steppi M. Bacolado
Ms. Stonebrothers	Sipalay City	Juliet Angeline Alvarez
Ms. Aldritz - Pau Masaje	Bacolod	Sandale Kishia Masangcay]
Ms. Aldritz - Bioclon	Cauayan	Alliah Janine Al Rashid
Ms. Silka	Talisay City	Althea Nicole Gadingan
Ms. Minute Burger	Murcia	Rebecca Gail Gerdon
Ms. Northwest Inn	Bacolod City	Sandale Kishia Masangcay
Ms. Flowers Studio	Himamaylan	Lyzabelle Blythe Siason Villa
Ms. SM Store	Cauayan	Alliah Janine Al Rashid
Ms. Usmile	Sagay	Jasmine Claire Pesquera
Ms. Merzci	Silay	Ina Marie Hengelmolen

== Special awards ==
Special Awards	Winner	Name
Muse of the Media	Himamaylan	Lyzabelle Blythe S. Villa
People's Choice Award	Sagay	Jasmine Claire Pesquera

== Major Awards ==
Major Corporate Awards	Winner	Name
Ms. Ayala Malls	Hinigaran	Ma. Xenia Angela Guanco
Ms. Coca-Cola	Hinigaran	Ma. Xenia Angela Guanco
Best in Festival Costume Designer (Urban Legends)	Hinigaran	Ma. Xenia Angela Guanco
Ms. Smart		
Ms. Globe		
Best in Festival Costume (Myths and Deities)	Sagay	Jasmine Claire Pesquera

== Contestants ==
Contestant	Name	Age
Bacolod City	Sandale Kishia Masangcay	20
Bago City	Chelyn Halpin	
Binalbagan	Mariam Althea Escalona	
Cadiz City	Steppi M. Bacolado	
Calatrava	Givernie Anne Tomarong	
Candoni	Ednalyn Garcia	
Cauayan	Alliah Janine Al Rashid	
Don Salvador Benedicto	Ricah Alcorin	
E.B. Magalona	Denielle Orsua	
Escalante	Catherine Pearl Lopez	
Himamaylan	Lyzabelle Blythe Siason Villa	
Hinigaran	Ma. Xenia Angela Guanco	
Hinoba-an	Khriselle Villarete	
Ilog	Ma. Neil Loqueloque	
Isabela	Melanie Claire Torillo	
Kabankalan	Keziah Nicole White	
La Carlota	Janella Marie Avelino	20
La Castellana	Allaena Dominique Angeles	
Moises Padilla	Thea Marie Abaño	
Murcia	Rebecca Gail Gerdon	
Pulupandan	Cristine Joy Gadiana	19
Sagay	Jasmine Claire Pesquera	17
Silay	Ina Marie Hengelmolen	
Sipalay	Juliet Angeline Alvarez	
Talisay	Althea Nicole Gadingan	
Toboso	Marace Salo	
Victorias	Paola Nicole Reconquista	
