= Lin-ay sang Negros 2017 =

- Date: April 28, 2017
- Presenters: Mikoy Morales, Jan Nicole Puentebella
- Venue: Pana-ad Stadium, Bacolod, Negros Occidental, Philippines
- Entrants: 24
- Returns: Escalante, Himamaylan, La Castellana, Pulupandan, San Enrique
- Winner: Angelika Esther Portugaleza; Bago

Lin-ay sang Negros 2017. the 23rd edition of the annual Lin-ay sang Negros pageant was held on April 28, 2017 at the Pana-ad Stadium. A total of 12 cities and 12 municipalities sent their representatives. Senator Juan Edgardo Angara and Lin-ay sang Negros 2016 winner Alyssa Jimenea of Victorias City, crowned her successor Angelika Esther Portugaleza of Bago at the end of the event. This is the first win for Bago since the pageant's inception in 1994.

== Final results ==
Final Result	Contestant
Lin-ay sang Negros 2017	Bago - Angelika Esther Portugaleza
1st Runner-Up	Pulupandan - Maria Angela Tañoso
2nd Runner Up	Silay-Elodie Langlet
Top 10	Candoni - Euan G. Castillo; Himamaylan - Fhaye Coleen Goza; Hinigaran - Mary Glissel s. Cabatac; Kabankalan- Trecia M. Toquero; Murcia - Ma. Paula C. Gibraltar; Sagay - Princess J. Kuan; Toboso - Febe Ann P. Punzalan

== Contestants ==
Contestant	Name
Bacolod City	Maria Angela Clarisse Estioko
Bago	Angelika Esther Portugaleza
Binalbagan	Rannie Anne Jocson
Cadiz	Maria Sariah S, Geronga
Calatrava	Ana G. Maasin
Candoni	Euan G. Castillo
Cauayan	Aila D. Cahaponon
Escalante	Kyra R. Uytiepo
Himamaylan	Fhaye Coleen Goza
Hinigaran	Mary Glissel s. Cabatac
Hinoba-an	Vines Joi Guinto
Kabankalan	Trecia M. Toquero
La Castellana	Kim C. Rato
Murcia	Ma. Paula C. Gibraltar
Pulupandan	Maria Angela Tañoso
Sagay	Princess J. Kuan
Salvador Benedicto	Linel C. Caballero
San Carlos	Allen Jean B. Mainit
San Enrique	Rosario Quitco Lu
Silay	Elodie Langlet
Sipalay	Princess Jane J. Sta. Ana
Talisay	Miles Liza Mondigo
Toboso	Febe Ann P. Punzalan
Victorias	Anne Reesee L. Jumuad

=== Notes ===
The pageant was directed by VTeam Network and was streamed via FB Live for the first time in the pageant history.

=== Hosts ===
- Mikoy Morales - GMA Kapuso Artist
- Jan Nicole Puentebella - Lin-ay sang Negros 2006

=== Panel of Judges ===
- Don Mcgyver Cochico - Manhunt International Philippines 2015 Winner
- Shannon Rebecca Bridgman - Miss Philippines Air 2016
- Jason Javelona - commercial model in the 90's from Negros
- AR Dela Serna - Print ad and runway model, Mister Supranational Philippines 2016
- Victoria Durana - Lin-ay sang Negros 2000
- Ricky Abad Jr. - Pageant Director, Chairman of the Board

=== Performances ===
- Dingdong Dantes GMA Kapuso Artist
