= Lin-ay sang Negros 2010 =

- Date: 26 March 2010
- Presenters: Iza Calzado; Mike Tan; John Arceo
- Venue: Panaad Stadium, Bacolod, Philippines
- Placements: 10
- Winner: Kareen Ty; Silay
- Photogenic: Ruth Angely Tan; San Enrique
- Best Festival Costume: Rhea Joy Florentino; Kabankalan

Lin-ay sang Negros 2010, the 16th edition of the annual Lin-ay sang Negros pageant was held on March 26, 2010 at the Panaad Stadium. She was crowned by 2009 Miss Earth Philippines, Sandra Seifert, and Lin-ay sang Negros 2009 Vickie Marie Rushton.

== Final results ==
Placement	Contestant
Lin-ay sang Negros 2010	Silay – Kareen Ty
1st Runner-up	Victorias – Ruffnee Reala
2nd Runner-up	Calatrava – Phoebe Corinne Ramsey Pataytay
Top 10	Bacolod – Christine Daphne Villanueva; Murcia – April Joy Recopuerto; Kabankalan – Rhea Joy Florentino; Himamaylan – Lyrine Bayle Ortiz; La Carlota – Shara Shane Rubejes; Sagay City – Shari Ann Albay; San Enrique – Ruth Angely Tan
