= Lin-ay sang Negros 2011 =

2011 beauty pageant in the Philippines

- Date: April 9, 2011
- Venue: Pana-ad Stadium, Bacolod, Negros Occidental
- Entrants: 24
- Winner: Ann Marie Malayo; Hinoba-an

Lin-ay sang Negros 2011, the 17th edition of the annual Lin-ay sang Negros pageant was held on April 9, 2011 at

the Pana-ad Stadium. A total of 24 candidates from all over Negros Occidental joined the pageant. Lin-ay sang Negros 2010 Kareen Ty of Silay City, along with Senator Jinggoy Estrada and First Lady of Negros Occidental Dr. Marilyn Marañon, crowned her successor, Ann Marie Malayo, at the end of the event.

== Final results ==
Final Result	City/Municipality	Name
Lin-ay sang Negros 2011	Hinoba-an	Ann Marie Malayo
1st Runner-Up	Cadiz	Angela Joy P. Johns
2nd Runner Up	Bacolod	Mary Catherine Abayon
Top 10	Candoni	Jessa Costelo
Top 10	Pulupandan	Mary Grace Unabia
Top 10	Silay City	Nathalie Persalida
Top 10	Victorias City	Saiphil Nipales
Top 10	Talisay City	Frances Keith Torres
Top 10	Binalbagan	Tiffany Grace Gentica
Top 10	San Carlos City	Janine Eborda

== Special awards ==
Special Award	Winner	Name
Best in Evening Gown	Hinoba-an	Ann Marie Malayo
Best in Swimsuit	Hinoba-an	Ann Marie Malayo
Miss Placenta	Cadiz	Angela Joy P. Johns
Best in Talent	Bacolod City	Catherine Ann Abayon
Lin-ay sang SM Department Store	Bacolod City	Catherine Ann Abayon
Miss SunStar Readers' Choice	Bacolod City	Catherine Ann Abayon
Miss Energy Development Corporation	Bacolod City	Catherine Ann Abayon
Miss Congeniality	San Carlos City	Janine Eborda
Miss Photogenic	Kabankalan City	Joy Magielen Jontillano
Best in Festival Costume	Talisay City	Frances Keith Torres
Muse of the Media	Candoni	Jessa Costelo
Miss Fit 'n Right	Binalbagan	Tiffany Grace Gentica
Miss Extract	Binalbagan	Tiffany Grace Gentica
Miss Island Living Channel	Binalbagan	Tiffany Grace Gentica
Negros Navigation Princess	Binalbagan	Tiffany Grace Gentica
Miss Gandang Index	La Carlota City	Belle Regine Chavez
Miss GMA Kapuso	Candoni	Jessa Costelo
Miss Olive-C	Candoni	Jessa Costelo
Miss SM City Bacolod	Candoni	Jessa Costelo
Miss SuperFerry	Victorias City	Saiphil Nipales
Miss Globe	Hinigaran	Quelch Ann Federez

== Other pageant notes ==
=== Significant Notes ===
- Hinoba-an won its second title. The first was in 1998 by Jerene Vinco.
- Cadiz made its first Top 3 placement since the pageant's inception in 1994.

=== Panel of judges ===
- Mikael Daez - model
- Barbara Salvador - beauty queen
- Dr. Mae Panes - doctor
- Leo Nilo Agustin - tourism officer
- Ben Jimena - tourism officer

=== Hosts ===
- Binibining Pilipinas - World 2006 Ann Mariz Igpit
- John Arceo
