= Angelia Ong =

Filipina beauty pageant titleholder

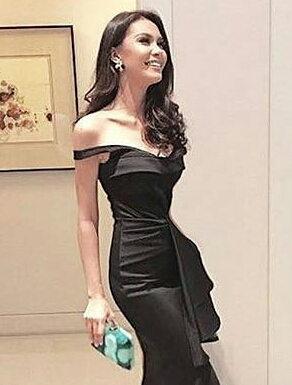
- Ong in 2016
- Born: Angelia Gabrena Paglicawan Ong; June 27, 1990 (age 36); Iloilo City, Philippines
- Education: De La Salle–College of Saint Benilde (Marketing Management)
- Height: 1.72 m (5 ft 8 in)
- Beauty pageant titleholder
- Title: Miss Philippines Earth 2015; Miss Earth 2015
- Major competitions: Binibining Pilipinas 2011; (Unplaced); Miss Philippines Earth 2015; (Winner); Miss Earth 2015; (Winner)

Angelia Gabrena Paglicawan Ong (Tagalog pronunciation: [ɔŋ]; born June 27, 1990) is a Filipina beauty pageant titleholder who won Miss Philippines Earth 2015 and Miss Earth 2015.

== Early life and education ==
Angelia Gabrena Paglicawan Ong is half Filipino and half Chinese. She was born in the Lapuz railway district in Iloilo City where she finished her primary and secondary education. She studied a few years at St. Paul University Iloilo for her early college education taking up Mass Communications.

She finished secondary education at Hua Siong College. She moved to Manila in 2011 and pursued her college education taking up marketing management at the De La Salle–College of Saint Benilde where she graduated in 2016.

== Pageantry ==
=== Prior to Miss Earth ===
Ong joined the StarStruck V and made it to top 60. She competed and finished second runner-up at Miss Manila 2014, and won best in long gown and press choice awards.

She competed at Binibining Pilipinas 2011, representing Iloilo City, and she received the People's Choice Special Award for the "Face of Binibining Pilipinas 2011."

=== Miss Philippines Earth 2015 ===
Ong won Miss Philippines Earth 2015 on May 31, 2015, at the Mall of Asia Arena in Pasay, and went on to represent the Philippines at Miss Earth 2015.

During the contest, she expressed support for same-sex marriage rights during a question-and-answer portion of the pageant:

I think it really depends on the person, if he or she believes in [same-]sex marriage but, as for me, if the person feels that he or she needs to be married to show his or her love, then I don’t mind having [same-]sex marriage. If you feel that that is love, then so be it.

She beat 37 other contestants from across the Philippines and was crowned by Miss Earth 2014 Jamie Herrell. As Miss Philippines Earth, her advocacy is focused on restoration, reforestation, and minimizing carbon footprint through ecotourism.

=== Miss Earth 2015 ===
Ong represented the Philippines and won Miss Earth 2015, held at Marx Halle, Vienna, Austria, on December 5, 2015. During the pre-pageant activities, Ong won a silver medal for the Miss Friendship award and a bronze medal for the evening gown competition.

During the top-8 round of question and answer, Ong was asked what would be Miss Earth's slogan for the next fifteen years. She replied:

We will, because we can. I want to let everybody know that all things are possible, and all things are feasible, if we work together. We will, because we can.

Ong was crowned by her predecessor Jamie Herrell, of the Philippines. Ong was the first to win back-to-back for her country in Miss Earth.

== Media and environmental activism ==
As a teenager, she was a co-host of the GMA Network–Iloilo local Sunday variety show, Bongga from 2004 to 2006.

On December 19, 2015, Ong joined the environmental group Ecowaste Coalition and launched the Iwas-Paputoxic campaign and urged the people, especially the youth, to welcome the 2016 New Year using safe and non-toxic materials.

She hosted the opening ceremony of the Asia–Pacific Forestry Week 2016 aimed at promoting sustainable forest management on February 23, 2016, which was organized by the United Nations Food and Agriculture Organization, Asia–Pacific Forestry Commission, and the Philippine Department of Environment and Natural Resources.

Ong led ten other beauty pageant titleholders in launching a project of the Armed Forces of the Philippines, dubbed as “Race to One Million Seedlings”, held in Camp Aguinaldo. The project aimed to grow and plant one million tree seedlings across Metro Manila, as part of the National Greening Program, which sought to increase forest cover in Metro Manila and adjacent regions.

Together with Philippine Senator Cynthia Villar, Ong led the Earth Day celebration in the Philippines on April 22, 2016, at the Las Piñas-Parañaque Critical Habitat and Ecotourism Area (LPPCHEA), a wetland situated south of Manila Bay. As an ambassador for environmental protection campaigns in the Philippines, she joined a coastal cleaning effort on the coast of Freedom Island. She also participated with other women in a hand-painting exercise to raise awareness and develop a sense of public responsibility pertaining to environmentally sustainable practices on Earth Day.

Ong completed the Climate Reality Leadership Corps training under US Vice President Al Gore, founder and chairman of the Climate Change Reality Project, for her pursuance of effective platform to create environmental awareness on climate change.

Ong travelled to the Reunion Islands and crowned Elsa Techer as Miss Earth Reunion Islands 2016 on May 7, 2016. During the Philippines Independence Day on June 12, 2016, she talked about her advocacy to fight climate change. On July 28, 2016, Ong went to the United States to attend Miss Earth United States 2016.

She went to Armenia, Colombia, on August 11, 2016, together with Btittany Ann Payne Miss Earth Water 2016, to crown the winner of Miss Earth Colombia 2016. She also joined the Miss Earth Colombia 2016 candidates for the Todos Ponemos program to promote sustainable development, preservation of natural resources, and "the three Rs": reduce, reuse, recycle.

Ong arrived in Sri Lanka on August 26, 2016, with the invitation by TV Derana. There she crowned the winner Derana Miss Sri Lanka for Miss Earth 2016 on August 31, 2016, at Citrus, Waskaduwa. In Sri Lanka, she engaged in numerous environmental projects, including the launching of “Manusath Derana Nature Force’ project, an initiative to plant one million trees in the country where 300 sandalwood plants were initially planted. She was accompanied by Brittany Ann Payne, Miss Earth Water 2016.

In April 2017, Ong and Miss Earth 2016 Katherine Espín flew to Angola for the Earth Day 2017 and for the crowning of Miss Earth Angola 2017 and also ayyended a tree planting activity together with Fundacao Verde with the support of the Government of Angola and the Ministerio do Ambiente.

Ong served as the muse of Thailand delegates in the opening ceremony of the 2019 Southeast Asian Games held at the Philippine Arena in the Philippines on November 30, 2019.

She appeared in the cover page of a Harper's Bazaar- Vietnam edition in November 2020 edition.

== Accolades and commendations ==
=== Office of the Philippine President ===
On December 14, 2015, the Office of the President of the Philippines commended Ong through Philippine Secretary of Presidential Communications and Operations Herminio Coloma for winning the Miss Earth 2015 title and giving the Philippines its first back-to-back win.

=== Senate of the Philippines ===
On December 14, 2015, the Senate of the Philippines through the Philippine Senate Resolution Number 1681 authored by Senator Manuel Lapid commended Ong for honoring the Philippines in her victory in the Miss Earth 2015 pageant. The Resolution indicated that "Ong made history as she succeeded another Filipina beauty queen, a first in the pageant's 15-year history and the third Filipina to bag the prestigious crown with Jamie Herrell as her predecessor and Karla Henry winning the crown in 2008, making the Philippines the only country with a three-crown record."

=== House of Representatives of the Philippines ===
The Lower House of the Philippines Congress, House of Representatives of the Philippines through the House Resolution Number 2561 which was authored by Congressman Leopoldo N. Bataoil commended Ong for her victory in the Miss Earth 2015 pageant. The House Resolution stated that "Ong's achievement brought pride to the Filipino people and will serve as an inspiration to young Filipino women, as well and remind the country of its responsibilities to the environment."

=== Empowered Men and Women of the Year 2017 ===
In December 2017, Ong was one of the awardees of 'Philippine Empowered Men and Women of the Year 2017' held at the Teatrino Prominade in San Juan, Metro Manila for her inspiring life story and her will to serve other people and communities.

Awards and achievements
Preceded by (Philippines) Jamie Herrell	Miss Earth; 2015	Succeeded by (Ecuador) Katherine Espín
Preceded by Jamie Herrell (Cebu City)	Miss Philippines Earth; 2015	Succeeded by Imelda Schweighart (Puerto Princesa, Palawan)
