= Lin-ay sang Negros 2007 =

Lin-ay sang Negros 2007, the 13th edition of the annual Lin-ay sang Negros pageant was held on April 20, 2007 at the Pana-ad Stadium. A total of 24 candidates from all over Negros Occidental joined the pageant. Lin-ay sang Negros 2006 Jan Nicole Puentebella of Bacolod City, along with Migz Zubiri and Tessie Aquino-Oreta crowned her successor, Christer Mari Taclobos of Bacolod City at the end of the event.

== Final results ==
Final Result	City/Municipality	Name
Lin-ay sang Negros 2007	Bacolod	Christer Mari Taclobos
1st Runner Up	Valladolid	Rose Sheil Oñate
2nd Runner Up	La Castellana	Lara Angelika Vera

== Contestants ==
Contestant	Name
Bacolod City	Christer Mari Taclobos
Bago City	Madel Magbanua
Binalbagan	Katherine Rosal
Calatrava	Xyza Magbulogtong
Candoni	Candy Granada
Cauayan	Sugar Meshelle Tumpag
E.B. Magalona	Ma. Corazon Bilbao
Himamaylan City	Vanessa Isok
Hinigaran	Aprille Paz Felicisimo
Hinoba-an	Curie Evangelista
Ilog	Gretchen Simple
Kabankalan City	Berlyn Grace Tolentino
La Castellana	Lara Angelika Vera
Moises Padilla	Toni Kinlah Tumapa
Murcia	Princess Dya Dim de la Cruz
Sagay City	Margarette Bantiling
Salvador Benedicto	Frebejean Bartolo
San Carlos City	Kareen Faye Gustilo
San Enrique	Rhea Mae Balome
Silay City	Carol Corcoso
Sipalay City	Deri Grace de Gracia
Talisay City	Aisa Caberte
Valladolid	Rose Sheil Oñate
Victorias City	Elan Jane Esteban

== Other Significant Notes ==
=== Host ===
TJ Trinidad

== Historical significance ==
1.) Bacolod made a back-to-back win; Jan Nicole Puentebella-2006, Christer Mari Taclobos-2007.
