= Lin-ay sang Negros 2016 =

- Date: April 18, 2016
- Presenters: Benjamin Alves, Max Collins
- Venue: Pana-ad Stadium, Bacolod, Negros Occidental, Philippines
- Entrants: 23
- Winner: Alyssa Louise Erika Tia Jimenea; Victorias City

Lin-ay sang Negros 2016, the 22nd edition of the annual Lin-ay sang Negros pageant was held on April 18, 2016 at the Pana-ad Stadium. A total of 11 cities and 12 municipalities sent their representatives. Lin-ay sang Negros 2015 winner Jessica Zevenbergen of San Carlos City, crowned her successor Alyssa Jimenea of Victorias at the end of the event. This is the first time the pageant is held with the province no longer a part of Western Visayas but the Negros Island Region.

== Final results ==
Final Result	Contestant
Lin-ay sang Negros 2016	Victorias - Alyssa Jimenea
1st Runner-Up	Murcia - Louise Lian Enumerable
2nd Runner Up	Sipalay - Artmarie Getonzo
Top 5	Bacolod - Ivy Benedicto; Toboso - Prairie Mandajoyan
Top 10	Cauayan - Princess Dahlia Gulucson; Hinigaran - Danielle Rose Ferraren; La Carlota - Juna Mae Perez; Sagay - Paolyn Louise Lacson; San Carlos - Roselle Ann Ramas

== Contestants ==
Contestant	Name
Bacolod	Ivy Benedicto
Bago City	Justine Marie Baer
Binalbagan	Cindy Angelou Yanga
Cadiz	Ernalyn Aureta
Calatrava	Sarah Magne Bautista
Candoni	Allen Gigante
Cauayan	Princess Dahlia Gulucson
E.B. Magalona	Johan Marie Javelosa
Hinigaran	Danielle Rose Ferraren
Hinoba-an	Marianne Dalipe
Ilog	Maria Jamela Fortaleza
Kabankalan	Vanessa Keith Adera
La Carlota City	Juna Mae Perez
Murcia	Louise Lian Enumerable
Pontevedra	Hezamae Gerale
Sagay City	Paolyn Louise Lacson
Don Salvador Benedicto	Jemmel Badera
San Carlos	Roselle Ann Ramas
Silay	Erna Torreblancea
Sipalay City	Artmarie Getonzo
Talisay City	Febbie Merivelez
Toboso	Prairie Mandajoyan
Victorias	Alyssa Jimenea

== Significant notes ==
=== Returns ===
- Bacolod - last competed in 2014. After winning the title three years in a row, Bacolod decided not to send a representative in 2015 to give way to other cities and municipalities.
- Ilog - last competed in 2012
- Pontevedra - hasn't been sending a representative in more than 10 years.
- Sipalay - last competed in 2012

=== Post-Pageant Nottes ===
- Louise Lian Enumerable joined Mutya ng Pilipinas NIR 2017 and was adjudged the winner.

=== Hosts ===
- Max Collins (Kapuso Star)
- Benjamin Alves (Kapuso Star)
