= Negros Occidental's 6th congressional district =

Legislative district of the Philippines

- Constituency for the House of Representatives of the Philippines
- Boundary of Negros Occidental's 6th congressional district in Negros Occidental
- Location of Negros Occidental within the Philippines
- Province: Negros Occidental
- Region: Negros Island Region
- Population: 525,597 (2020)
- Electorate: 307,048 (2022)
- Major settlements: 6 LGUs: Cities; Kabankalan; Sipalay; Municipalities; Candoni; Cauayan; Hinoba-an; Ilog
- Area: 2,485.03 km^{2} (959.48 sq mi)

Current constituency
- Created: 1987
- Representative: Mercedes Alvarez
- Political party: NPC
- Congressional bloc: Majority

Negros Occidental's 6th congressional district is one of the six congressional districts of the Philippines in the province of Negros Occidental. It has been represented in the House of Representatives since 1987. The district consists of the area in southern Negros Occidental containing the cities of Kabankalan and Sipalay, and the municipalities of Candoni, Cauayan, Hinoba-an and Ilog. It is currently represented in the 20th Congress by Mercedes Alvarez of the Nationalist People's Coalition (NPC).

== Representation history ==
#	Image	Member	Term of office		Congress	Party	Electoral history	Constituent LGUs
#	Image	Member	Start	End	Congress	Party	Electoral history	Constituent LGUs
=== Negros Occidental's 6th district for the House of Representatives of the Philippines ===
District created February 2, 1987. Redistricted from Negros Occidental's at-large district.
1		Hortensia L. Starke	June 30, 1987	June 30, 1995	8th	Lakas ng Bansa	Elected in 1987.	1987–present Candoni, Cauayan, Hinoba-an, Ilog, Kabankalan, Sipalay
1		Hortensia L. Starke	June 30, 1987	June 30, 1995	9th	Lakas	Re-elected in 1992.	1987–present Candoni, Cauayan, Hinoba-an, Ilog, Kabankalan, Sipalay
2		Genaro M. Alvarez Jr.	June 30, 1995	June 30, 2004	10th	NPC	Elected in 1995.	1987–present Candoni, Cauayan, Hinoba-an, Ilog, Kabankalan, Sipalay
2		Genaro M. Alvarez Jr.	June 30, 1995	June 30, 2004	11th	NPC	Re-elected in 1998.	1987–present Candoni, Cauayan, Hinoba-an, Ilog, Kabankalan, Sipalay
2		Genaro M. Alvarez Jr.	June 30, 1995	June 30, 2004	12th	NPC	Re-elected in 2001.	1987–present Candoni, Cauayan, Hinoba-an, Ilog, Kabankalan, Sipalay
3		Genaro Rafael K. Alvarez III	June 30, 2004	June 30, 2007	13th	KAMPI	Elected in 2004.	1987–present Candoni, Cauayan, Hinoba-an, Ilog, Kabankalan, Sipalay
(2)		Genaro M. Alvarez Jr.	June 30, 2007	June 30, 2010	14th	NPC	Elected in 2007.	1987–present Candoni, Cauayan, Hinoba-an, Ilog, Kabankalan, Sipalay
4		Mercedes K. Alvarez	June 30, 2010	June 30, 2019	15th	NPC	Elected in 2010.	1987–present Candoni, Cauayan, Hinoba-an, Ilog, Kabankalan, Sipalay
4		Mercedes K. Alvarez	June 30, 2010	June 30, 2019	16th	NPC	Re-elected in 2013.	1987–present Candoni, Cauayan, Hinoba-an, Ilog, Kabankalan, Sipalay
4		Mercedes K. Alvarez	June 30, 2010	June 30, 2019	17th	NPC	Re-elected in 2016.	1987–present Candoni, Cauayan, Hinoba-an, Ilog, Kabankalan, Sipalay
(2)		Genaro M. Alvarez Jr.	June 30, 2019	June 30, 2022	18th	NPC	Elected in 2019.	1987–present Candoni, Cauayan, Hinoba-an, Ilog, Kabankalan, Sipalay
(4)		Mercedes K. Alvarez	June 30, 2022	Incumbent	19th	NPC	Elected in 2022.	1987–present Candoni, Cauayan, Hinoba-an, Ilog, Kabankalan, Sipalay
(4)		Mercedes K. Alvarez	June 30, 2022	Incumbent	20th	NPC	Re-elected in 2025.	1987–present Candoni, Cauayan, Hinoba-an, Ilog, Kabankalan, Sipalay

== Election results ==
=== 2025 ===
2025 Philippine House of Representatives election in the First District of Negros Occidental
Candidate	Party	Votes	%
Mercedes Alvarez	Nationalist People's Coalition	180,266	84.15
Ernesto Estrao	PDP-Laban	33,965	15.85
Total		214,231	100.00
Nationalist People's Coalition hold			
Source: Commission on Elections

=== 2022 ===
2022 Philippine House of Representatives elections
Party	Candidate	Votes	%
NPC	Mercedes Alvarez	164,069	
Total votes			
NPC hold			

=== 2019 ===
2019 Philippine House of Representatives elections
Party	Candidate	Votes	%
NPC	Genaro "Lim-Ao" Alvarez Jr.	152,345	
Independent	Jackie Bilbao	76,115	
Total votes			
NPC hold			

== See also ==
- Legislative districts of Negros Occidental
