= Mercedes Alvarez–Lansang =

Filipino politician

Mercedes Alvarez
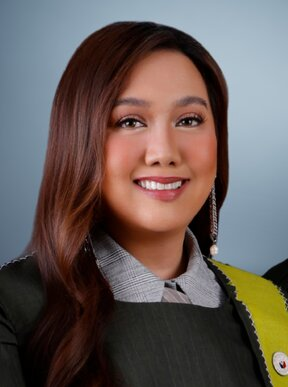
- Official portrait, 2025

Member of the Philippine House of Representatives from Negros Occidental's 6th District
- Incumbent
- Assumed office June 30, 2022
- Preceded by: Genaro Alvarez Jr.
- In office June 30, 2010 – June 30, 2019
- Preceded by: Genaro Alvarez Jr.
- Succeeded by: Genaro Alvarez Jr.

Deputy Speaker of the House of Representatives of the Philippines
- Incumbent
- Assumed office August 3, 2026
- House Speaker: Bojie Dy
- In office July 25, 2016 – June 30, 2019
- House Speaker: Pantaleon Alvarez; Gloria Macapagal Arroyo

Personal details
- Born: Mercedes Kho Alvarez; October 20, 1982 (age 43) Bacolod, Philippines
- Party: NPC (2009–present)
- Education: Assumption College; University of St. La Salle

Mercedes "Cheding" Alvarez–Lansang (born October 20, 1982), is a Filipino politician who served as Deputy Speaker of the House of Representatives of the Philippines and represented the 6th district of Negros Occidental.

== Family members ==
Rep. Alvarez is the daughter of former Vice Governor Genaro Alvarez Jr., himself a former representative of the district. On October 6, 2016, she married Major Dranreb "Dran" Lansang of the Philippine Army's 1st Scout Ranger Regiment.

== As legislator ==
Alvarez was elected as member of the Board of the Forum of Young Parliamentarians from the Asia Pacific in Geneva, Switzerland. She also represented the Philippines to the Inter-Parliamentary Union conferences in New York and Tokyo. She was elected unopposed in the 2016 Philippine general election.

In the 17th Congress of the Philippines, she was elected as one of the Deputy Speakers under the leadership of Speaker Pantaleon Alvarez (no relation), as part of the multi-party coalition named Coalition for Change.

She was known for pictures lying on the road in southern Negros during the last State of Nation Address of President Benigno Aquino III. Rep. Alvarez is a staunch advocate of sustainable tourism practices in "CHICKS area," which stands for 6th district towns and cities composed of Cauayan, Hinoba-an, Ilog, Candoni, Kabankalan and Sipalay.

From 2023 to 2025, Alvarez received ₱4.4 billion of "allocable" funds from the national budget. These "Allocable" funds have been criticized by the People’s Budget Coalition as a new form of pork barrel, since it goes to "politically determined projects that crowd out more equitable and accountable public spending"
