= Lin-ay sang Negros 2014 =

- Date: April 4, 2014
- Presenters: Charles Kevin Tan, Isabelle Daza
- Venue: Pana-ad Stadium, Bacolod, Negros Occidental, Philippines
- Entrants: 22
- Winner: Alexis Danica B. Drilon; Bacolod

Lin-ay sang Negros 2014, the 20th edition of the annual Lin-ay sang Negros pageant was held on April 4, 2014 at the Pana-ad Stadium. Twenty-two (22) ladies from different cities and municipalities of Negros Occidental participated in the pageant. Lin-ay sang Negros 2013 of Bacolod Samyah Al-dossary crowned Alexos Danica Drilon also of Bacolod.

== Final results ==
Final Result	City/Municipality	Name
Lin-ay sang Negros 2014	Bacolod	Alexis Danica B. Drilon
1st Runner-Up	Isabela	Nesha Faith R. Dianala
2nd Runner Up	Cadiz	Shermen Rose V. Perez
Top 5	Binalbagan	Alyanna Serran
Top 5	Talisay	Treni Rivera
Top 10	Cauayan	Apriel Claridad
Top 10	Toboso	Maria Kristina Lim
Top 10	San Carlos	Beverly Binghay
Top 10	Himamaylan	Kristel Shane Genova
Top 10	Murcia	Annalita P. Vizcarra

== Contestants ==
Contestant	Name
Bacolod	Alexis Danica B. Drilon
Bago City	No Entry
Binalbagan	Alyanna T. Serran
Cadiz	Shermen Rose V. Perez
Calatrava	No Entry
Candoni	Alaica Victoria L. Lambot
Cauayan	Apriel M. Claridad
Don Salvador Benedicto	No Entry
E.B. Magalona	Lindy A. Cabahug
Escalante City	Danica Jane P. Doneza
Himamaylan City	Kristel Shane I. Genova
Hinigaran	Jolyn B. Ang
Hinoba-an	Camille Victoria D. Acibido
Ilog	No Entry
Isabela	Nesha Faith Dianala
Kabankalan City	Jincky D. Basis
La Carlota City	Kate P. Ynzon
La Castellana	No Entry
Manapla	No Entry
Moises Padilla	Hazel May U. Meguiso
Murcia	Annalita P. Vizcarra
Pulupandan	No Entry
Pontevedra	No Entry
Sagay City	Marjodi Alexiz B. Tumonong
San Carlos City	Beverly S. Binghay
San Enrique	Krismaine T. Tallafer
Silay City	Thiryne R. Mondragon
Sipalay City	No Entry
Talisay City	Treni Rivera
Toboso	Maria Kristina V. Lim
Valladolid	No Entry
Victorias City	Casey Joy G. Jocsin

== Other pageant notes ==
=== Historical significance ===
- Alexis Danica Drilon became the fifth Lin-ay sang Bacolod to win the crown. This also marked Bacolod's third win in a row.
- Shermen Rose Perez was Dinagsa Festival Queen's second runner-up. Because of the typhoon Yolanda, no pageant was held in Cadiz and she was handpicked to represent the city.

=== Panel of judges ===
- Sam Adjani - Model and Mister World Philippines 2016
- Elaine Kay Moll - Miss 2012 Supranational third runner-up
- Jonas Gaffud - Mercator Wedding Manager
- June Macasaet - Manhunt International 2013
- Stephanie Stefanowitz. - Miss Earth Air 2013

=== Hosts ===
- Charles Kevin Tan - Negrense song writer
- Isabelle Daza - Model/Actress

=== Performances ===
- GMA's My Husband's Lover stars Tom Rodriguez and Dennis Trillo
