= Miss Philippines Earth 2015 =

15th Miss Philippines Earth pageant

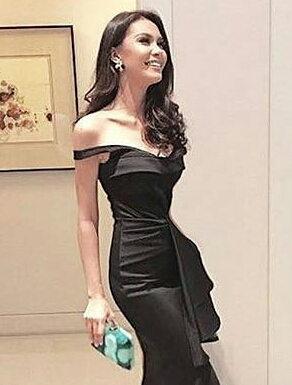
- Angelia Ong
- Date: May 31, 2015
- Presenters: Robi Domingo; Karla Henry; Ginger Conejero
- Entertainment: G-FORCE Dancers
- Theme: Setting a Legacy of Beauty and Responsibility
- Venue: SM Mall of Asia Arena, Pasay, Metro Manila
- Broadcaster: ABS-CBN; The Filipino Channel; Rappler
- Entrants: 38
- Placements: 15
- Winner: Angelia Ong; Manila
- Congeniality: Chanel Olive Thomas San Antonio
- Photogenic: Alyanna Cagandahan Santa Cruz, Laguna

Miss Philippines Earth 2015 was the 15th Miss Philippines Earth pageant, held at the SM Mall of Asia Arena in Pasay, Metro Manila on 31 May 2015.

Angelia Ong of Manila was crowned by Jamie Herrell of Cebu City at the end of the event. New crowns made by jeweller Ramon Papa were unveiled during the pageant. Ong represented the Philippines and won Miss Earth 2015.

== Results ==
=== Placements ===
Placement	Contestant
Miss Philippines Earth 2015	Manila – Angelia Ong
Miss Philippines Air 2015	San Antonio – Chanel Olive Thomas
Miss Philippines Water 2015	Bago – Catherine Joy Marin
Miss Philippines Fire 2015	Siniloan – Carla Angela Valderrama
Miss Philippines Eco Tourism 2015	Iloilo City – Jona Sweett
Runners-Up	Cabanatuan – Diana Mackey; Cagayan de Oro – Beatrice Alvarez; Guinobatan – Jian Cayla Salazar; Misamis Oriental – Mitsume Aguilar; Santa Cruz – Alyanna Mikaela Cagandahan
Top 15	Baguio – Sofia Loren Deliu; Dinalupihan – Myle Alexis Reyes; Iligan – Jocehl Cristoria; Lipa – Paris Adele Silva; Mandaue – Mhon Theress Menaling

== Special awards ==
=== Special awards ===
Awards	Contestant
Best in Evening Gown	Iloilo City – Jona Sweett
Best in Swimsuit	San Antonio – Chanel Olive Thomas
Miss Photogenic	Santa Cruz – Alyanna Mikaela Cagandahan
Best in Cultural Attire	Lipa – Paris Adele Silva §
Miss Friendship	San Antonio – Chanel Olive Thomas
Best Eco-Video	Ipil – Maria Loraine Grengia

§ — Costume that won the Best in Cultural Attire designed by Chico Estiva Dos will be worn by the Philippines' representative at the Miss Earth 2015 pageant.

=== Sponsor Awards ===
Awards	Contestant
Miss SM Markets	Bago – Catherine Joy Marin
Miss Hana Shampoo	Manila – Angelia Ong
Miss PonteFino Residences	San Antonio – Chanel Olive Thomas
Miss Hotel PonteFino	Cabanatuan – Diana Mackey
CEO's Choice	Cabanatuan – Diana Mackey

== Delegates ==
The following is the list of the official delegates of Miss Philippines Earth 2015 that represented various cities, municipalities and provinces. There were no representatives from Cagayan Valley (Region II), Mimaropa / Southern Tagalog Islands (Region IV-B), Caraga (Region XIII) and ARMM.

National Capital Region
No.	Delegate	Hometown	Region
1	Kimberly Anne Sarreal	Makati	NCR
2	Angelia Ong	Manila	NCR
3	Donna Marie Libre	Marikina	NCR
4	Danica Cagas	Parañaque	NCR
5	Patrizia Mariah Garcia	Pasig	NCR
6	Chezka Paulina Carandang	Quezon City	NCR
7	Darlene Hipolito	San Juan	NCR

North and Central Luzon
No.	Delegate	Hometown	Region
8	Sofia Loren Deliu	Baguio	Cordillera
9	Alvie Shame Lacson	Bamban, Tarlac	Central Luzon (Region III)
10	Diana Mackey	Cabanatuan	Central Luzon (Region III)
11	Myle Alexis Reyes	Dinalupihan, Bataan	Central Luzon (Region III)
12	Meryl Joy Yandan	Moncada, Tarlac	Central Luzon (Region III)
13	Chanel Olive Thomas	San Antonio, Nueva Ecija	Central Luzon (Region III)
14	Alyssa Ashley Calimlim	Villasis, Pangasinan	Ilocos Region (Region I)

South Luzon and Bicol
No.	Delegate	Hometown	Region
15	Jhelie Habana	Bula, Camarines Sur	Bicol Region (Region V)
16	Seika Santos	Cainta, Rizal	Calabarzon / Southern Tagalog Mainland (Region IV-A)
17	Jian Cayla Salazar	Guinobatan, Albay	Bicol Region (Region V)
18	Paris Adele Silva	Lipa, Batangas	Calabarzon / Southern Tagalog Mainland (Region IV-A)
19	Joyce-Ann Acelajado	Pagsanjan, Laguna	Calabarzon / Southern Tagalog Mainland (Region IV-A)
20	Alyanna Mikaela Cagandahan	Santa Cruz, Laguna	Calabarzon / Southern Tagalog Mainland (Region IV-A)
21	Carla Angela Valderrama	Siniloan, Laguna	Calabarzon / Southern Tagalog Mainland (Region IV-A)

Visayas
No.	Delegate	Hometown	Region
22	Aiko Rachelle Caraan	Badian, Cebu	Central Visayas (Region VII)
23	Catherine Joy Marin	Bago, Negros Occidental	Western Visayas (Region VI)
24	Gayle Suzette Yu	Calape, Bohol	Central Visayas (Region VII)
25	Jona Sweett	Iloilo City	Western Visayas (Region VI)
26	Shanette Delalamon	Lapu-Lapu, Cebu	Central Visayas (Region VII)
27	Mhon Theress Menaling	Mandaue, Cebu	Central Visayas (Region VII)
28	Kristelle Mae Atinen	Medellin, Cebu	Central Visayas (Region VII)
29	Marianna Darlene Pepito	Ormoc, Leyte	Eastern Visayas (Region VIII)
30	Lhiben Louriza Basco	Sogod, Southern Leyte	Eastern Visayas (Region VIII)

Mindanao
No.	Delegate	Hometown	Region
31	Beatrice Alvarez	Cagayan de Oro	Northern Mindanao (Region X)
32	Merry Cris dela Cruz	Davao City	Davao Region / Southern Mindanao (Region XI)
33	Jocehl Cristoria	Iligan	Northern Mindanao (Region X)
34	Maria Loraine Grengia	Ipil, Zamboanga Sibugay	Zamboanga Peninsula / Western Mindanao (Region IX)
35	Dyan Oniola	Kidapawan, Cotabato	Soccsksargen / Central Mindanao (Region XII)
36	Mitsume Aguilar	Cagayan de Oro	Northern Mindanao (Region X)
37	Parisada Galicinao	Pagadian, Zamboanga del Sur	Zamboanga Peninsula / Western Mindanao (Region IX)
38	Jane Aguillon	Zamboanga City	Zamboanga Peninsula / Western Mindanao (Region IX)

== Judges ==
Judge	Background
Cristina Gonzales	Actress and Tacloban Councilor
Michael Cacnio	Glass Sculptor
Agnes Ventura Rosinio	First Lady of Italian Ambassador to the Philippines
Jorge Reynoso III	Rooms Division Manager, Diamond Hotel Manila
Arnold Daluz	SVP, SM Markets
Zsazsa Padilla	"Divine Diva" of Philippine Showbiz
Lorraine E. Schuck	Executive Vice President, Carousel Productions
Jasper Tiu	VP for Marketing, Peerless Manufacturing Corporation (Hana Shampoo)
Thomas Ossowski	Ambassador of Germany to the Philippines

== International broadcast ==
- Worldwide - Rappler, YouTube
- United States - The Filipino Channel
