= Vickie Rushton =

Filipino-British actress and beauty pageant titleholder

Vickie Rushton-Abalos
- Born: Vickie Marie Milagrosa Sausa Rushton; 8 May 1992 (age 34); Bacolod, Philippines
- Occupations: Beauty pageant titleholder; actress; model; television presenter
- Height: 1.68 m (5 ft 6 in)
- Spouse: Jason Abalos (m. 2022)
- Children: 1
- Beauty pageant titleholder
- Title: Mutya ng Pilipinas International 2011
- Agency: Star Magic (2014–2019, 2024–present)
- Years active: 2011–2019, 2026–present
- Hair color: Black
- Eye color: Brown
- Major competitions: Mutya ng Pilipinas 2011 (Winner – Mutya ng Pilipinas International 2011); Binibining Pilipinas 2018 (1st Runner-Up); Binibining Pilipinas 2019 (Top 15)

Vickie Marie Milagrosa Sausa Rushton-Abalos (born May 8, 1992) is a Filipino-British actress, model and beauty pageant titleholder who was crowned Mutya ng Pilipinas International 2011. Rushton eventually gained more exposure in the public eye when she became a housemate in Pinoy Big Brother: All In, where she finished in 4th place.

== Pageantry ==
=== Mutya ng Pilipinas ===
On December 2, 2011, Rushton was crowned Mutya ng Pilipinas — International 2011 winner. It was in the same pageant where the would-be Miss International 2013, Bea Rose Santiago joined and placed as one of the 10 semi-finalists and was given a special title as Mutya ng Pilipinas Overseas. Being the Mutya ng Pilipinas 2011 winner, Rushton was supposed to represent the Philippines in the Miss Intercontinental 2011 pageant in Alicante, Spain. However, because of the delayed schedule of the local pageant, Kathleen Anne Po was handpicked to represent the Philippines instead.

=== Binibining Pilipinas ===
On January 16, 2018, it was confirmed that Rushton will be competing at the Binibining Pilipinas 2018 pageant. On March 18, she was crowned as the 1st Runner-up. Upon, joining the Binibining Pilipinas pageant in 2019 she was considered an early favorite to win the competition. She collected several corporate awards such as Jag Denim Queen, Miss Ever Bilena, Manila Bulletin Reader's Choice, Poten Cee Gandang Palaban, and Bb. Cream Silk during the pageant. Her failure to give a complete answer during the question and answer portion among the top 15 contestants was regarded as the reason for her not to move up to the next round where the eventual winners to represent the country in international beauty contests were chosen. She said in post-contest interviews that she was distracted when she delivered her answer.

== Career ==
=== Pinoy Big Brother: All In ===
On April 27, 2014, Rushton entered the Pinoy Big Brother house as a housemate of Pinoy Big Brother: All In. In the initial stages of the competition, she was portrayed as the pretty girl who was always under the radar; because of this, she was labeled as the one who contributed in her team. She was also romantically teased by some of her fellow housemates, particularly Cheridel Alejandrino by housemate Daniel Matsunaga, which led to some controversy between her and showbiz boyfriend, Jason Abalos. On Day 79, Rushton was nominated for the first time; she earned 22.96% of the total votes saving her from the eviction. Rushton made it to the Big Night and placed 4th, garnering -0.78% of net votes.

== Personal life ==
Her engagement in 2021 with her long-time partner, actor Jason Abalos, was revealed in June 2022. They were married in a church wedding ceremony in Batangas on September 1 of the same year. And on September 1, 2023, coinciding with their first wedding anniversary, they both had their first child named Knoa Alexander.

== Filmography ==
=== Television ===
Year	Title	Role	Notes
2014	Pinoy Big Brother: All In	Herself/housemate	4th Big Placer
2014	Aquino & Abunda Tonight	Herself	Guest; episode: "August 28, 2014"
2014	Kris TV	Herself	Guest
2015	Maalaala Mo Kaya: Korona	Babymaker	Acting debut
2015	Kapamilya Deal or No Deal	Contestant/Lucky Stars	Briefcase Number 16
2017	FPJ's Ang Probinsyano	Amanda	
2017	La Luna Sangre	Vampire Ally	
2017	Wattpad Presents: Captivated by Tyrone Greene	Jordan Gonzales	

=== Film ===
Year	Title	Role	Notes
2014	Endless (Pinoy Big Brother: All In)	Vickie	Short film
2015	The Breakup Playlist		

Awards and achievements
Preceded by Carla Jenina Lizardo	Mutya ng Pilipinas — International; 2011	Succeeded by Camille Guevarra
Preceded by Karlyn May Bautista	Lin-ay sang Negros; 2009	Succeeded by Kareen Ty
