= Hinoba-an =

Municipality in Negros Occidental, Philippines

Hinoba-an Asia
- Municipality
- Municipality of Hinoba-an
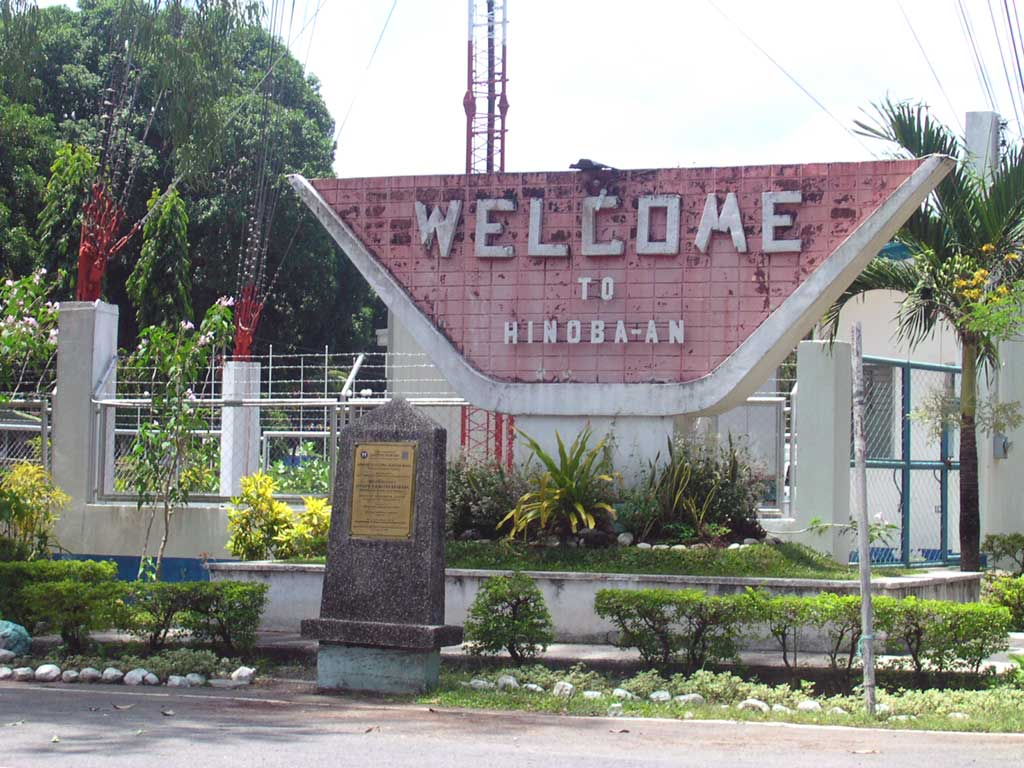
- "Welcome" sign board along the highway

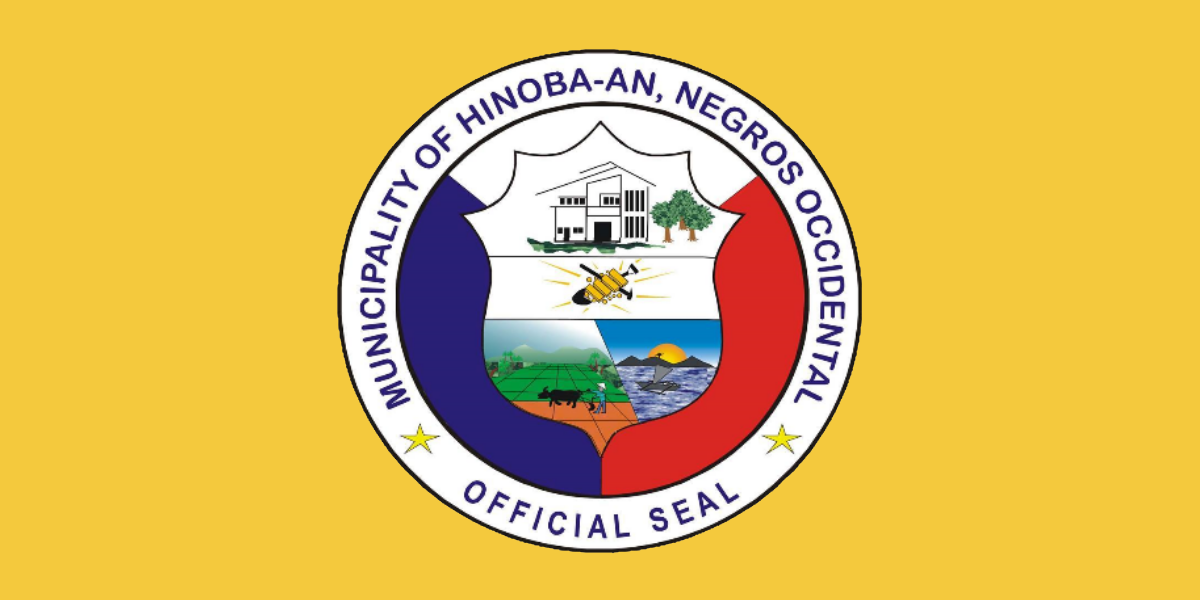
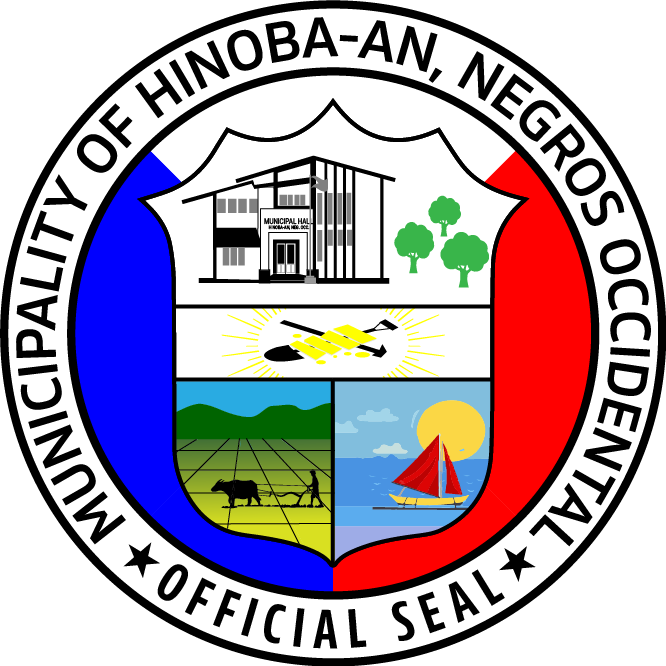
- Flag Seal
- Motto: Paspas Hinobaan
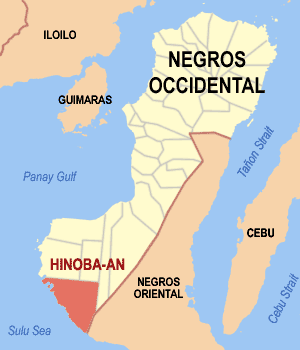
- Map of Negros Occidental with Hinoba-an highlighted
- Interactive map of Hinoba-an
- Location within the Philippines
- Coordinates: 9°36′06″N 122°28′01″E
- Country: Philippines
- Region: Negros Island Region
- Province: Negros Occidental
- District: 6th district
- Founded: November 20, 1948
- Barangays: 13 (see Barangays)

Government
  - Type: Sangguniang Bayan
  - Mayor: Daph Anthony V. Reliquias (PFP)
  - Vice Mayor: Francisco Jose L. Bilbao, Jr. (PFP)
  - Representative: Mercedes Alvarez (NPC)
  - Municipal Council: Members: Jodybonne G. Octavio; Gems Bernard V. Reliquias; Jefre L. Encoy; Romeo A. Yusay, Jr.; Edgardo F. Malayo; Noel B. Lapore; Theodore D. Tubilleja; Thomas Bermarc R. Santes
  - Electorate: 38,857 voters (2025)

Area
  - Total: 414.50 km^{2} (160.04 sq mi)
- Elevation: 78 m (256 ft)
- Highest elevation: 687 m (2,254 ft)
- Lowest elevation: 0 m (0 ft)

Population (2024 census)
  - Total: 64,364
  - Density: 155.28/km^{2} (402.18/sq mi)
  - Households: 14,099

Economy
  - Income class: 1st municipal income class
  - Poverty incidence: 30.71% (2023)
  - Revenue: ₱ 291.8 million (2024)
  - Assets: ₱ 821 million (2024)
  - Expenditure: ₱ 299.8 million (2024)
  - Liabilities: ₱ 477.3 million (2024)

Service provider
  - Electricity: Negros Occidental Electric Cooperative (NOCECO)
- Time zone: UTC+8 (PST)
- ZIP code: 6114
- PSGC: 064512000
- IDD : area code: +63 (0)34
- Native languages: Hiligaynon; Tagalog; Cebuano
- Website: www.hinobaan.gov.ph

Hinoba-an, officially the Municipality of Hinoba-an (formerly Asia), is a municipality in the province of Negros Occidental, Philippines. According to the 2024 census, it has a population of 64,364 people.

The town is home to the Magahat language, the indigenous language of Southern Negros as listed by the Komisyon ng Wikang Filipino. The language is vital to the culture and arts of the people.

== History ==
Formerly a part of Cauayan, Hinoba-an was inhabited by natives called "Magabat". When immigrants from Panay came and settled in the coastal areas, the settlers began to group in the area where the town is now located. Traders visited to barter products like clothing made in Miag-ao, Tigbauan and Guimbal in Iloilo.

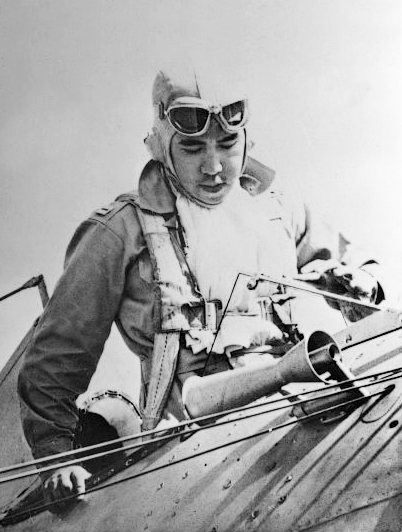
Col. Jesús A. Villamor exiting a plane after landing in Hinoba-an

Spanish authorities did not establish a presence in Hinoba-an, as the area remained largely forested and undeveloped during their rule in Negros Occidental. It was primarily visited by residents of Cauayan and nearby towns for hunting, and as a result, no significant events related to Spanish occupation were recorded until the early 20th century.

In the early 1900s, Don Estanislao Bilbao, a Basque émigré and patriarch of the Bilbao clan---one of the area's prominent families, begun a decades-long process of settling an area south of where Hinoba-an would come to be. In a few years, a significant plot of land had been rehabilitated to which thousands of germinating coconut husks were planted in precise rows. Maturing and bearing crop in under a decade, once coastal wilderness was transformed into copra producing land. Paddy fields were likewise developed further inland close to irrigation sources.

The subsequent grant of landownership, along with the total absence of government due to the area's remoteness, it became the basis for Don Estanislao's provisional administration of the people and the place. He became the area's primary, if not for a time, sole employer. As a matter of moral imperative and practical necessity, he also became the de facto Judge and Sheriff, adjudicating upon and enforcing common law.

Through his marriage to Felicidad Rivas—an heiress to a similarly homesteaded parcel of land nearby, Don Estanislao doubled the size of the holding. The holding was a productive agricultural expanse that, from points north to south, stretched for miles. The couple's beneficence and philanthropy made the Bilbao name respected in the area. Sons Joaquin and Francisco, and daughter-in-law Teresa, have each been elected town's mayor. Today, the Bilbaos have governed the municipality for a collective span of over thirty years.

When the Americans landed in Negros during World War II, Hinoba-an became a historical point of entry by the combined U.S. and Philippine Commonwealth military forces. Col. Salvador Abcede, district commander of the 7th military district, established his island headquarters in this town during the Japanese occupation.

Col. Jesús A. Villamor, aboard submarine USS Gudgeon (SS-211), landed at Ubong Point and occupied Ubong Cave as command post supply food and arms to guerillas.

After Liberation, Hinoba-an was rehabilitated by some of its pioneering residents. More settlements were established, schools were built, trails developed for the people's convenience in going to places and in transporting their local produce to nearby towns and villages. There was also a huge influx of Cebuano-speaking people during this time.

== Geography ==
Hinoba-an is the southernmost town of the province. It is bounded on the north by Sipalay City and Candoni; on the south by Basay, Negros Oriental; on the east by the town of Ilog; and on the west by the Sulu Sea. The total land area of Hinoba-an is 421.50 square kilometers. It is 187 kilometres (116 mi) from Bacolod and 154 kilometres (96 mi) from Dumaguete, the capital of Negros Oriental.

=== Barangays ===
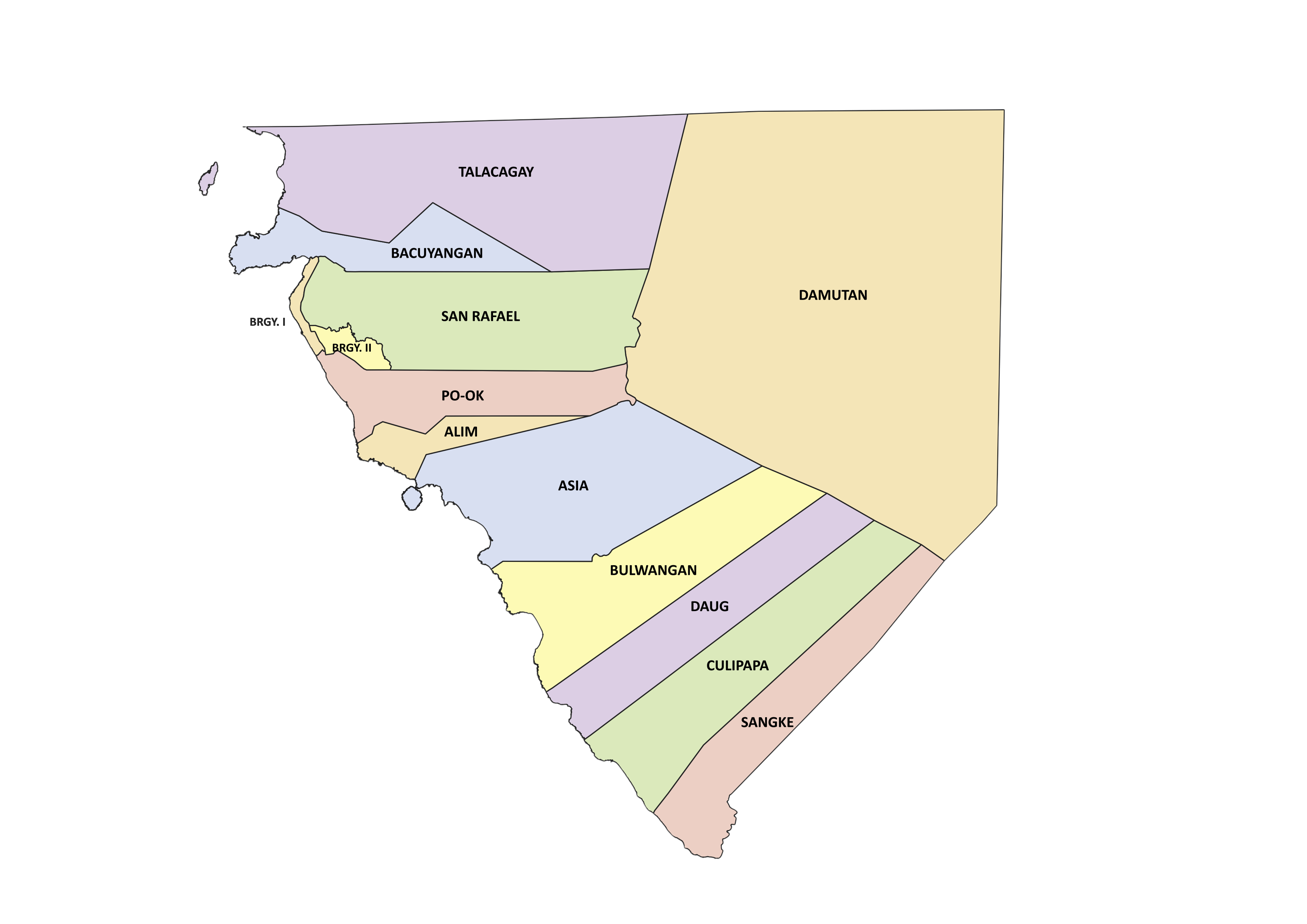
Political map of Hinoba-an

Former flag of Hinoba-an

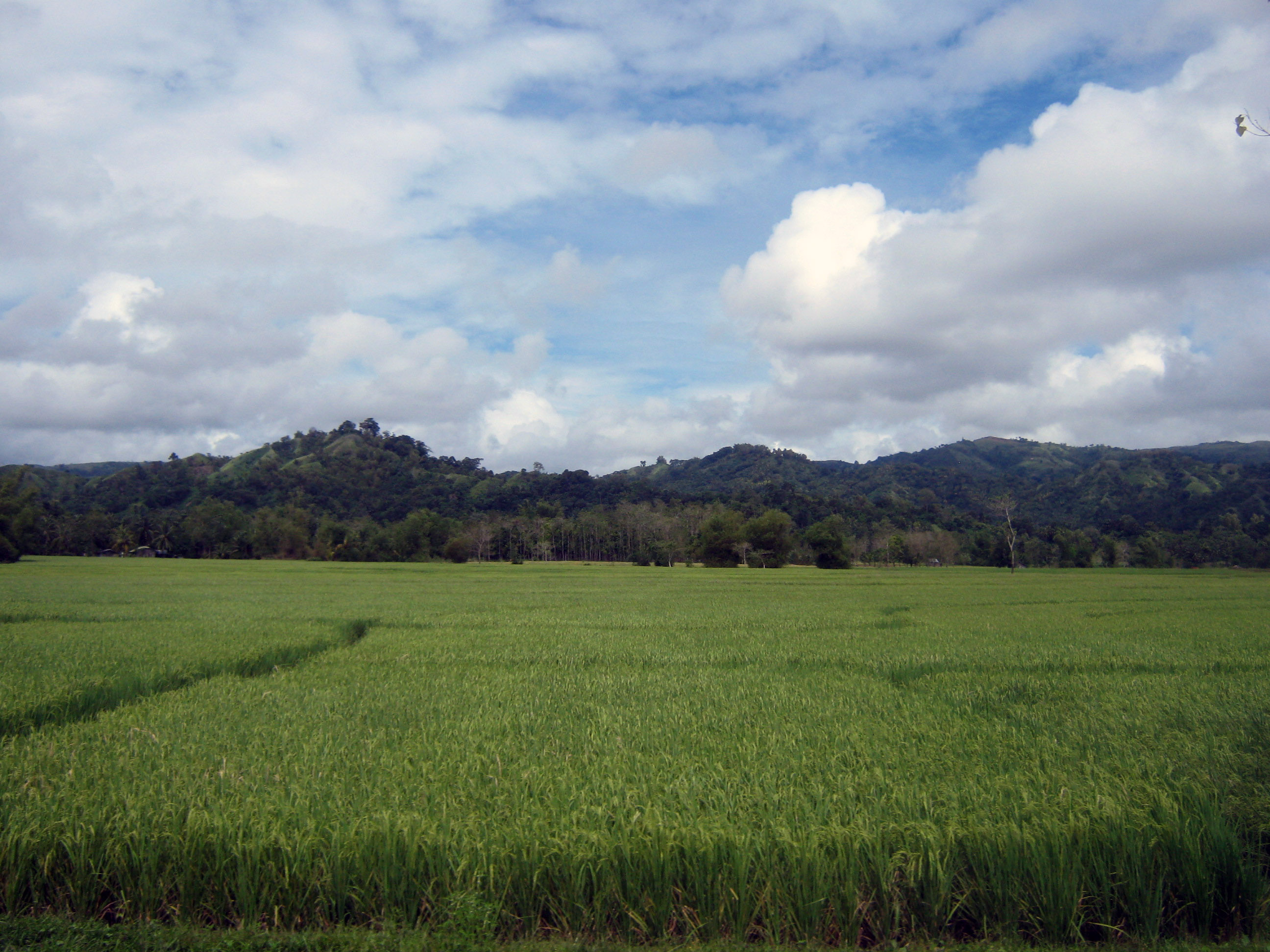
Rice field in Hinoba-an

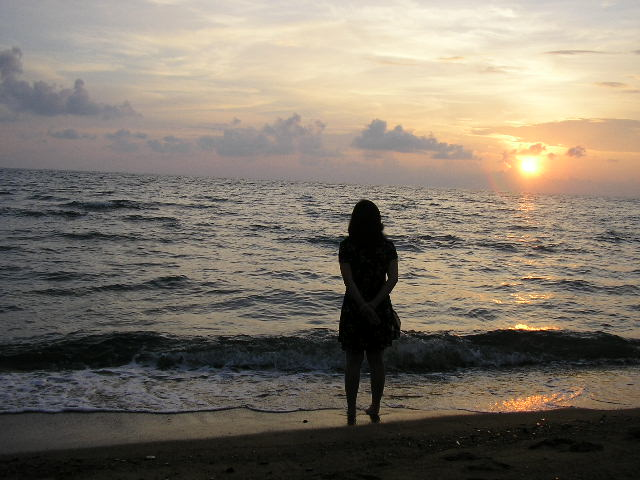
Sunset in the coast of Hinoba-an

Hinoba-an is politically subdivided into 13 barangays. Each barangay consists of puroks and some have sitios.

- Alim
- Asia
- Bacuyangan
- Barangay I (Poblacion)
- Barangay II (Poblacion)
- Bulwangan
- Culipapa
- Damutan
- Daug
- Po-ok
- San Rafael
- Sangke
- Talacagay

=== Climate ===
Climate data for Hinoba-an, Negros Occidental
Month	Jan	Feb	Mar	Apr	May	Jun	Jul	Aug	Sep	Oct	Nov	Dec	Year
Mean daily maximum °C (°F)	29 (84)	30 (86)	31 (88)	32 (90)	30 (86)	29 (84)	28 (82)	28 (82)	28 (82)	28 (82)	29 (84)	29 (84)	29 (85)
Mean daily minimum °C (°F)	21 (70)	21 (70)	22 (72)	23 (73)	24 (75)	24 (75)	24 (75)	24 (75)	24 (75)	24 (75)	23 (73)	22 (72)	23 (73)
Average precipitation mm (inches)	45 (1.8)	37 (1.5)	62 (2.4)	93 (3.7)	190 (7.5)	259 (10.2)	284 (11.2)	236 (9.3)	244 (9.6)	247 (9.7)	162 (6.4)	86 (3.4)	1,945 (76.7)
Average rainy days	10.8	8.4	12.7	16.3	26.7	28.5	29.1	28.0	27.4	28.5	23.4	15.5	255.3
Source: Meteoblue

== Demographics ==
Population census of Hinoba-an
Year	Pop.	±% p.a.
1960	8,630	—
1970	17,475	+7.30%
1975	32,357	+13.15%
1980	45,819	+7.20%
1990	40,813	−1.15%
1995	40,819	+0.00%
2000	50,809	+4.81%
2007	53,894	+0.82%
2010	54,624	+0.49%
2015	56,819	+0.75%
2020	60,865	+1.46%
2024	64,364	+1.35%
Source: Philippine Statistics Authority

=== Languages ===
The people of Hinoba-an predominantly speak Cebuano and Hiligaynon, which are used interchangeably every day. Tagalog and English are also understood.

== Economy ==
Poverty incidence of Hinoba-an (%)

Source: Philippine Statistics Authority

== Tourism ==
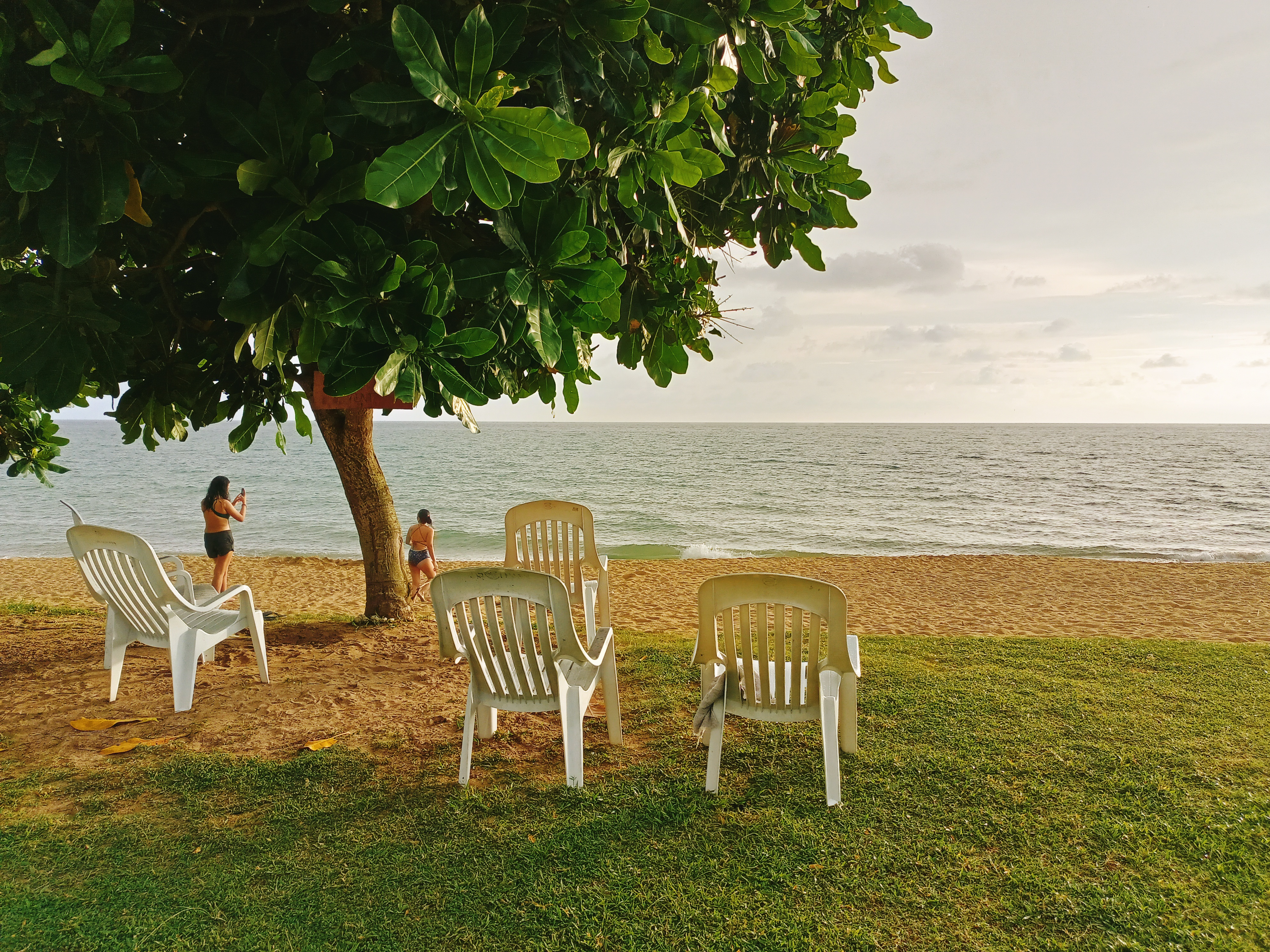

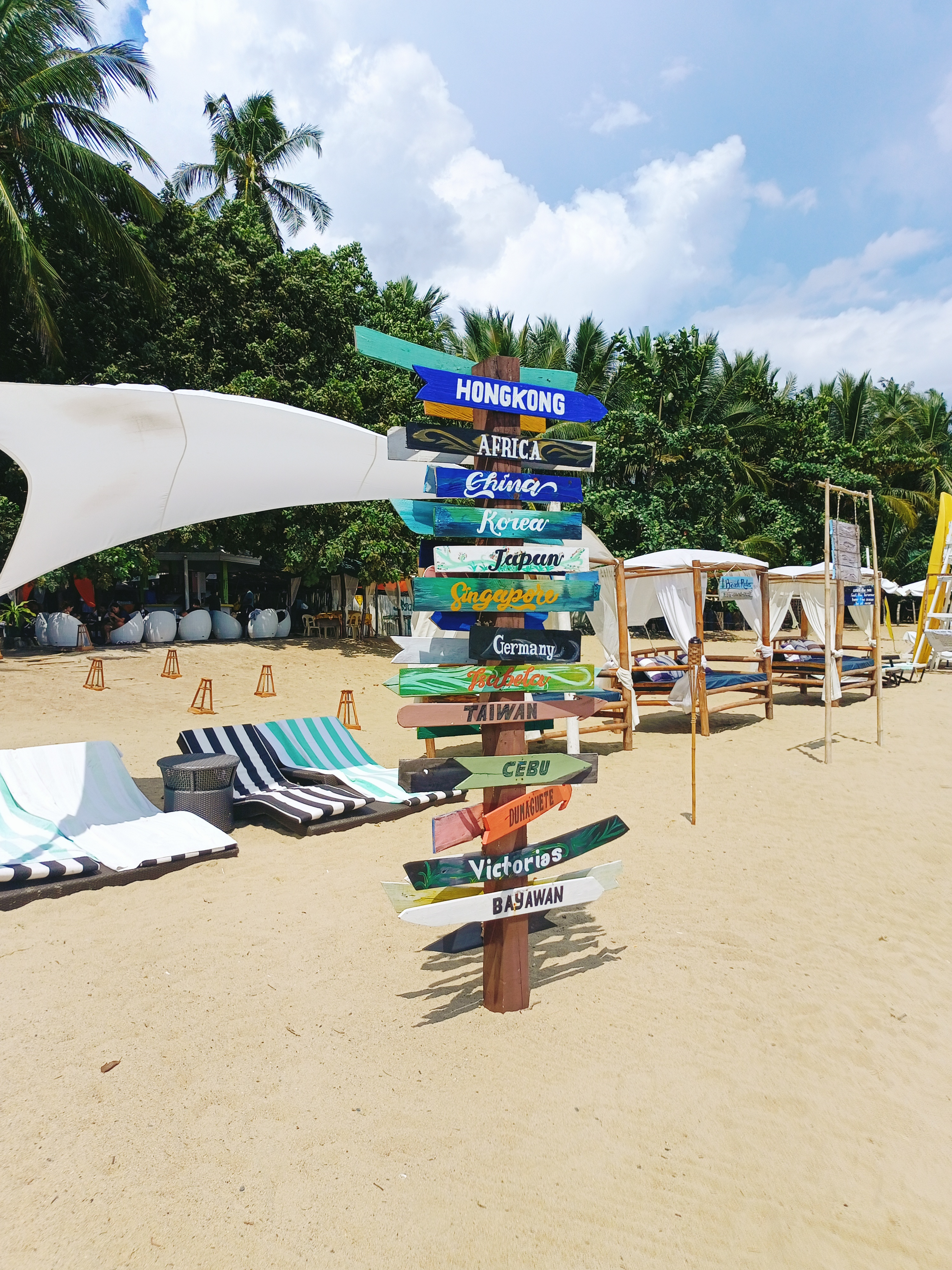
Beach resorts at Hinoba-an

Salvacion Cave along the vicinity of pebbled beaches of Barangay Talacagay has a natural covered pools ideal for bathing.

Ubong Cave is where the late Col. Jesús A. Villamor, hero of World War II landed bringing firearms for the Philippine guerillas aboard the US Navy Submarine USS Gudgeon (SS-211) in 1942, establishing the first radio contact with General Douglas MacArthur based in Australia at that time.

== See also ==
- List of renamed cities and municipalities in the Philippines
