= Cauayan, Negros Occidental =

Municipality in Negros Occidental, Philippines

Cauayan
- Municipality
- Municipality of Cauayan
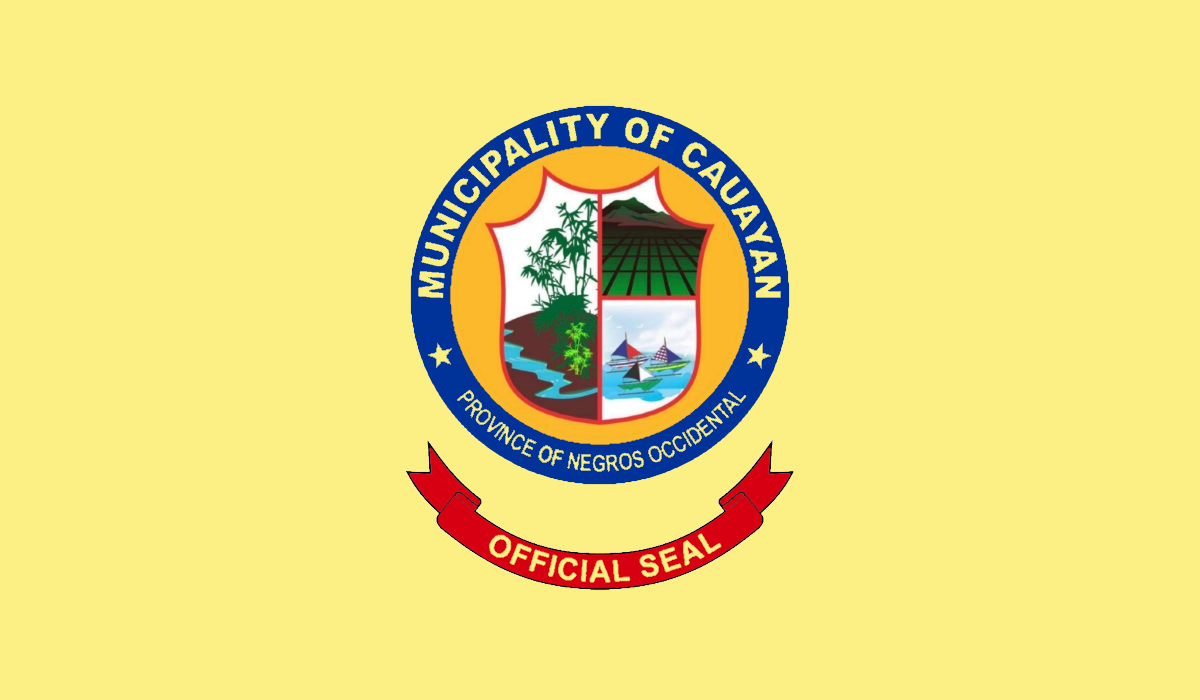
- Flag Seal
- Motto: Sanyog Cauayan! (English: Thrive Cauayan!)
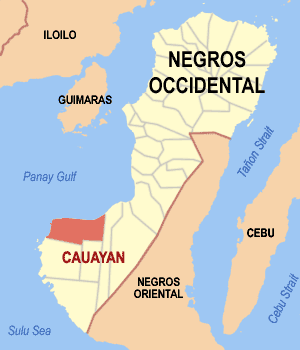
- Map of Negros Occidental with Cauayan highlighted
- Interactive map of Cauayan
- Location within the Philippines
- Coordinates: 9°58′N 122°37′E
- Country: Philippines
- Region: Negros Island Region
- Province: Negros Occidental
- District: 6th district
- Founded: 1822
- Named for: Bamboo (locally called Kawayan)
- Barangays: 25 (see Barangays)

Government
  - Type: Sangguniang Bayan
  - Mayor: John Rey D. Tabujara (NPC)
  - Vice Mayor: Anna Liza Tabujara-Soriano (PFP)
  - Representative: Mercedes Alvarez (NPC)
  - Municipal Council: Members: Sammy S. Jabagat; Rico James Y. Tabujara; Ernie R. Magbanua; Greg Carlo J. Sumogat; Angelic O. Sarmiento; Joselito S. Gelvosa; Romulo M. Mombay; Ian Rey G. Cantutay; Jerome A. Agustin ^{‡}; John Anthony C. Millarez ^{◌}; ‡ ex officio ABC president; ◌ ex officio SK chairman
  - Electorate: 59,953 voters (2025)

Area
  - Total: 520.00 km^{2} (200.77 sq mi)
- Elevation: 63 m (207 ft)
- Highest elevation: 605 m (1,985 ft)
- Lowest elevation: 0 m (0 ft)

Population (2024 census)
  - Total: 110,899
  - Density: 213.27/km^{2} (552.36/sq mi)
  - Households: 24,587

Economy
  - Income class: 1st municipal income class
  - Poverty incidence: 39.21% (2023)
  - Revenue: ₱ 450.6 million (2024)
  - Assets: ₱ 1,632 million (2024)
  - Expenditure: ₱ 410.8 million (2024)
  - Liabilities: ₱ 680.4 million (2024)

Service provider
  - Electricity: Negros Occidental Electric Cooperative (NOCECO)
- Time zone: UTC+8 (PST)
- ZIP code: 6112
- PSGC: 064507000
- IDD : area code: +63 (0)34
- Native languages: Hiligaynon; Tagalog

Cauayan, officially the Municipality of Cauayan (Hiligaynon: Banwa sang Cauayan; Tagalog: Bayan ng Cauayan), is a municipality and the most populous municipality in the province of Negros Occidental, Philippines. According to the 2024 census, it has a population of 110,899 people.

== History ==
Before the arrival of the Spaniards in Negros, the area that would become this town was a wilderness inhabited by indigenous people who relied on hunting and fishing. The original settlement was surrounded by dense bamboo thickets, known in Hiligaynon language as kawayán, giving rise to the name "Cauayan" (pronounced kawayán, "place where bamboo grows abundantly").

Don Vicente Paulo Decena, believed to have come from Cebu, formally established Cauayan in 1822. During the Spanish period, the location of the municipal government was contested among Guiljungan, Cauayan, and Isio, with Isio ultimately chosen as the administrative center due to its larger population. Despite this, gobernadorcillos were also appointed to Cauayan and Guiljungan.

During the Spanish period, Cauayan was evangelized by the Augustinian Recollects. It became in independent parish in 1851, having San Pablo Apóstol has the patron of the town. They were the teachers of the native children the first public schools were open after 1863. After the American administration arrived in 1904, the tribunal in Isio was moved to Cauayan, which encouraged socioeconomic growth. Residents were introduced to modern agricultural practices, and public infrastructure including schoolhouses, roads, and bridges was constructed.

== Geography ==
Located on the southern portion of the province, Cauayan is bounded on the east by the municipality of Ilog; on the south by the municipality of Candoni; on the west by the mining city of Sipalay and on the north by Panay Gulf with its bountiful fishing grounds.

Cauayan is 111 kilometres (69 mi) from the provincial capital of Bacolod and is known for its sandy beaches and pristine waters, limestone and dried fish products.

Cauayan has a rugged topography. Mt. Malipantao separates the municipality from the town of Candoni and the city of Sipalay. Portion of the ranges are the remaining thick forest that needs protection where the watershed is located. The remaining portions of the municipality are slightly rolling to moderate large areas of flat lands center on the different barrios, which is much suited to agriculture.

The municipality consists mainly of the following slope distribution:

From gently sloping at 0-3 percent or equivalent to 5,369.42 hectares to moderately sloping at 3-8 percent or a total of 1,059.40 hectares to rolling lands with slopes ranging from 8-18 percent which covers to about 1,716.94 hectares. A bigger portion is moderately steep with a slope distribution ranging from 18 to 30 percent having a total area of 19,419.42 hectares. However, large areas are steep and mountains with a slope of 30-50 percent, which accounts to 21,181.92 hectares, and to very steep hills and mountains with a slope of over 50 percent, which covers to about 3,246.90 hectares. Moderately large areas of flat land center on the different barrios. However, the southern part of the municipality is hilly. The Poblacion and the 12 barangays along the seashore are approximately 0-3 degrees above sea level.

=== Barangays ===
Cauayan is politically subdivided into 25 barangays. Each barangay consists of puroks and some have sitios.

These are further categorized into the Coastal and the Upland Barangays.

Barangay	Location	Classification	Population (May, 2000)	Population (May, 2010)
Abaca	upland	Rural	1,361	1,419
Baclao	upland	Rural	1,012	888
Basak	upland	Rural	3,010	3,355
Bulata	coastal	Rural	4,863	4,753
Caliling	coastal	Urban	4,570	5,410
Camalanda-an	upland	Urban	4,810	4,703
Camindangan	upland	Rural	2,727	2,262
Elihan	coastal	Rural	1,267	1,535
Guiljungan	coastal	Urban	9,870	9,822
Inayawan	coastal	Urban	9,407	10,224
Isio	coastal	Urban	5,089	6,139
Linaon	coastal	Rural	3,464	3,308
Lumbia	upland	Rural	1,098	1,163
Mambugsay	coastal	Rural	4,976	4,997
Man-uling	coastal	Urban	2,332	2,732
Masaling	coastal	Urban	3,615	3,770
Molobolo	upland	Rural	1,242	1,165
Poblacion	coastal	Urban	8,361	9,418
Sura	upland	Rural	409	522
Talacdan	upland	Rural	3,392	4,165
Tambad	upland	Rural	904	1,002
Tiling	coastal	Rural	3,146	4,135
Tomina	upland	Rural	947	1,317
Tuyom	coastal	Urban	5,407	6,144
Yaoyao	upland	Rural	2,131	2,573

=== Climate ===
Climate data for Cauayan, Negros Occidental
Month	Jan	Feb	Mar	Apr	May	Jun	Jul	Aug	Sep	Oct	Nov	Dec	Year
Mean daily maximum °C (°F)	30 (86)	31 (88)	32 (90)	33 (91)	32 (90)	30 (86)	29 (84)	29 (84)	29 (84)	29 (84)	30 (86)	30 (86)	30 (87)
Mean daily minimum °C (°F)	22 (72)	22 (72)	22 (72)	24 (75)	25 (77)	25 (77)	25 (77)	25 (77)	24 (75)	24 (75)	23 (73)	23 (73)	24 (75)
Average precipitation mm (inches)	38 (1.5)	29 (1.1)	55 (2.2)	65 (2.6)	141 (5.6)	210 (8.3)	212 (8.3)	176 (6.9)	180 (7.1)	180 (7.1)	130 (5.1)	70 (2.8)	1,486 (58.6)
Average rainy days	9.0	7.2	11.1	13.5	25.6	28.4	28.9	27.3	26.9	27.7	21.8	13.8	241.2
Source: Meteoblue (modeled/calculated data, not measured locally)

== Demographics ==
Population census of Cauayan

Year	Pop.	±% p.a.
1903	8,174	—
1918	13,907	+3.61%
1939	25,645	+2.96%
1948	34,946	+3.50%
1960	43,384	+1.82%
1970	52,508	+1.92%

Year	Pop.	±% p.a.
1975	64,244	+4.13%
1980	70,017	+1.74%
1990	81,063	+1.48%
1995	84,159	+0.70%
2000	88,610	+1.11%
2007	93,569	+0.75%

Year	Pop.	±% p.a.
2010	96,921	+1.29%
2015	102,165	+1.01%
2020	108,480	+1.27%
2024	110,899	+0.53%

Source: Philippine Statistics Authority

== Economy ==
Poverty incidence of Cauayan (%)

Source: Philippine Statistics Authority

== Tourism ==
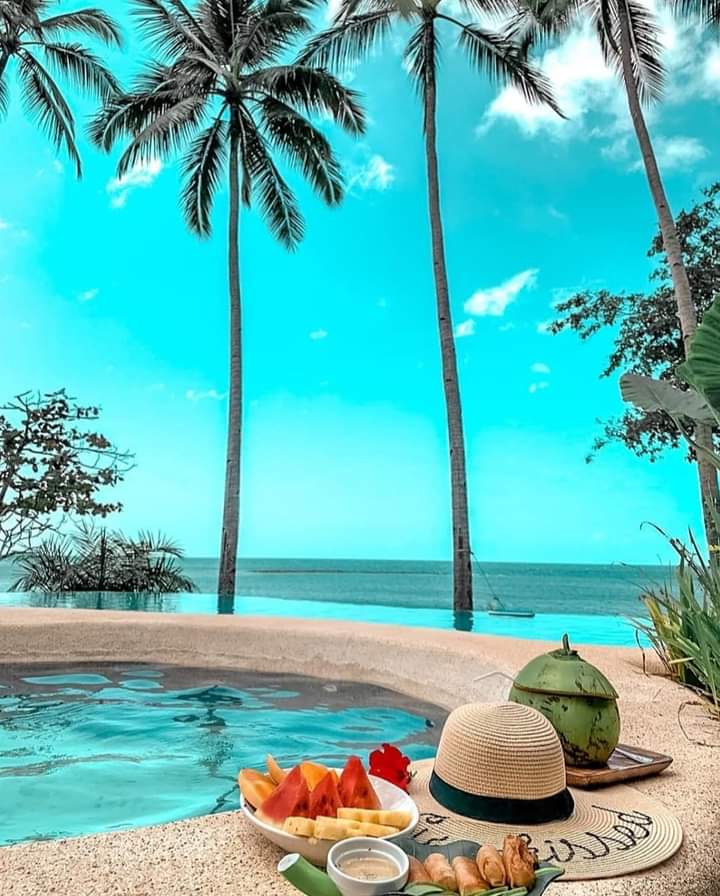
Punta Bulata Resort & Spa

Tourism has recently picked up in the Cauayan Municipality, with its fine white sand beaches and diverse marine and wildlife.

Punta Bulata Resort & Spa is a resort with an AA accreditation from the Department of Tourism.

Danjugan Island Marine Reserve is a wildlife sanctuary in Barangay Bulata is also one of the most recognized dive spots in the region. This island has one of the most diverse and highly dense coral life in the world. Visitors may go for day-trips to the island with pre-arranged visits by contacting Danjugan Island or through Punta Bulata Resort.

The Lubay-lubay Festival and Feast of the Conversion of St. Paul is held annually on January 25.

== Health ==
The main concern of the Local Government Unit of Cauayan is the provision of adequate health facilities and services to its constituents. The Rural Health Unit in the Poblacion is supported by 24 Barangay Health Stations and 22 sub-stations located in the different barangays. Complementing the health services is the newly operated Cauayan District Hospital managed by the Local Government Unit located in Barangay Isio. Services offered include medical consultation, maternal and child care, immunization, control of diarrheal diseases, control of acute respiratory infection, family planning, nutrition, tuberculosis control, leprosy control, dental health, rabies control, malaria control, sexually transmitted disease control, AIDS prevention, cancer control, dengue control, cardiovascular disease prevention and control, prevention of blindness, environmental sanitation and care of the elderly.

== Government ==
=== Social welfare ===
The Municipal Social Welfare and Development Office is charged with the function of accelerating delivery of social services in the municipality. The target outreach for welfare services is generally classified as follows: family heads, children, out-of-school youths, disabled, special groups, distressed families and rebel returnees.

Social services are rendered to Family Heads and Other Needy Adults (FHONA), needy children, youth, disabled/elderly, women, and the distressed. Social programs include Self-Employment Assistance Program, day care and supplemental feeding, Emergency Assistance, Self-Employment Assistance, Relief Assistance, and Responsible Parenthood/Pre-Marriage Counseling. Cauayan also offers social services like Child Abuse, Youthful Offenders, Peer Group Services, Organization of Elderly Groups, Organization of Barangay Council for Protection of Children, and Organization of Barangay Disaster Coordinating Council.

=== Peace and order ===
The municipality police force has a total strength of 28 members who maintain the peace and order and assist with emergencies. It is complemented by the 4th Mobile Coy PNP or Provincial Mobile Group (PMG) in maintaining peace and order especially in the campaign against subversives and lawless elements in the town and nearby municipalities. This is further augmented by the 61st Infantry Battalion of the Philippine Army based in Barangay Tiling.

== Infrastructure ==
=== Transportation ===
The municipality can be reached through public utility buses and jeeps plying the route Bacolod-Cauayan-Sipalay-Hinoba-an with terminals in Bacolod City and sub-terminals in Kabankalan City on a scheduled basis. Transportation facilities plying the route from the Kabankalan to the different barangays and vice versa are public utility jeeps with terminals in other growth centers aside from Poblacion. There are about 525 units of public tricycles being utilized for short-distance travel.

=== Roads ===
The municipality has a total road length of 298 kilometers. Of this, barangay roads constitute 70.57 percent or an aggregate of 210.29 kilometers. Most of the barangay roads are still unpaved with a total of 192.98 kilometers categorized under the gravel road surface. Only 2.31 kilometers and three kilometers are of concrete and asphalt, respectively. Ranked next is the national road with a total of 64 kilometers or about 21.5 percent. Of the total, 62 kilometers are concrete asphalt and the remaining two kilometers as concrete road surface. The provincial roads, on the other hand, comprise 20.5 kilometers or equivalent to only 6.9 percent of the total road length where 17 kilometers are still classified under the gravel road surface. The municipal roads represent about 1.1 percent or a total of 3.21 kilometers; they are all of concrete surface and basically service the urban center with a total projected population of 7,096.

=== Communication ===
The municipality has no land line telephone connections. The only available facilities are the two telephone franchise holders or public calling offices: Philippine Long Distance Telephone Office (PLDT-PCO) and Bayan Telephone Services.

Mailing services are mainly handled by the Bureau of Posts which is headed by a postmaster and two postmen. Other telecommunication services are the municipal radio station and the PC/PNP radio station with their citizens band radio operated by the office of the mayor and the PC/PNP, respectively. The former is engaged in communication services to and from the provincial offices and other municipal offices, while the latter specializes in communication services directly related to peace and order radio messages.

=== Energy ===
One of the major sources of power is the Negros Occidental Electric Cooperative (NOCECO), which started providing electric power in September 1982. It only covers six barangays; however, with an increasing population, the demand for electric power is also increasing. As a result, out of 25 barangays, 23 are already energized. The remaining two barangays settled down to kerosene, which is still widely used by the remaining 73 percent of the total number of potential consumers who are not served by the electric cooperative.

=== Water ===
There are two levels of water supply in the municipality. Level I refers to point sources of water such as wells, springs and rain collectors. Level II refers to communal faucet systems. The municipality is deficient in the point of piped potable water available for residential and commercial purposes.

There are 18 existing waterworks system under the Level II water system found in 18 barangays with one faucet in every cluster of houses, or a total of 386 faucets. Except for Barangay Inayawan, which is operated by the cooperative, the rest are managed by the Barangay Council. Since the municipality is still generally rural, the local waterworks system uses communal faucets where houses are densely clustered enough to justify a piped distribution system providing a number of households with faucets. In other barangays, household consumers pay a flat rate at a minimum of P10.00 per month while others operate their water system for free.

== Education ==
The municipality is divided into two school districts, Cauayan I and Cauayan II, which offer complete elementary and secondary education. It also offers non-formal education to out-of-school youths. There are in the municipality 62 elementary schools. 31 have complete elementary education and the remaining 30 schools only cater to primary education. From these 62 elementary schools, 21 are located along the highway, some are near the seacoast, and the rest are widely scattered in the mountainous area of the municipality.

For secondary education, there are seven main national high schools and three private secondary schools. Among the excelling schools are Guiljungan National High School, Tuyom National High School, Eva J Montilla National High School, and Camalandaan National High School. Students have competitively participated in divisional and regional conferences from these schools.

To further provide the educational and/or tertiary needs of the Cauayanons, the Central Philippines State University has a campus in Cauayan (originally known as the Negros Occidental Agriculture College (NOAC) when it officially opened on June 8, 1999, and between 2001 and 2012, as Negros Occidental State College of Agriculture (NESCA) - Cauayan Campus).

== Notable personalities ==
- Angel Alcala (1929–2023) - biologist who was conferred as National Scientist of the Philippines in 2014.
- Anthony Jennings (born 2000), actor
- Romeo Intengan - Catholic Jesuit Priest, Provincial Superior of the Philippine province of the Society of Jesus, Social activist
