= San Enrique, Negros Occidental =

Municipality in Negros Occidental, Philippines

San Enrique Candaguit
- Municipality
- Municipality of San Enrique
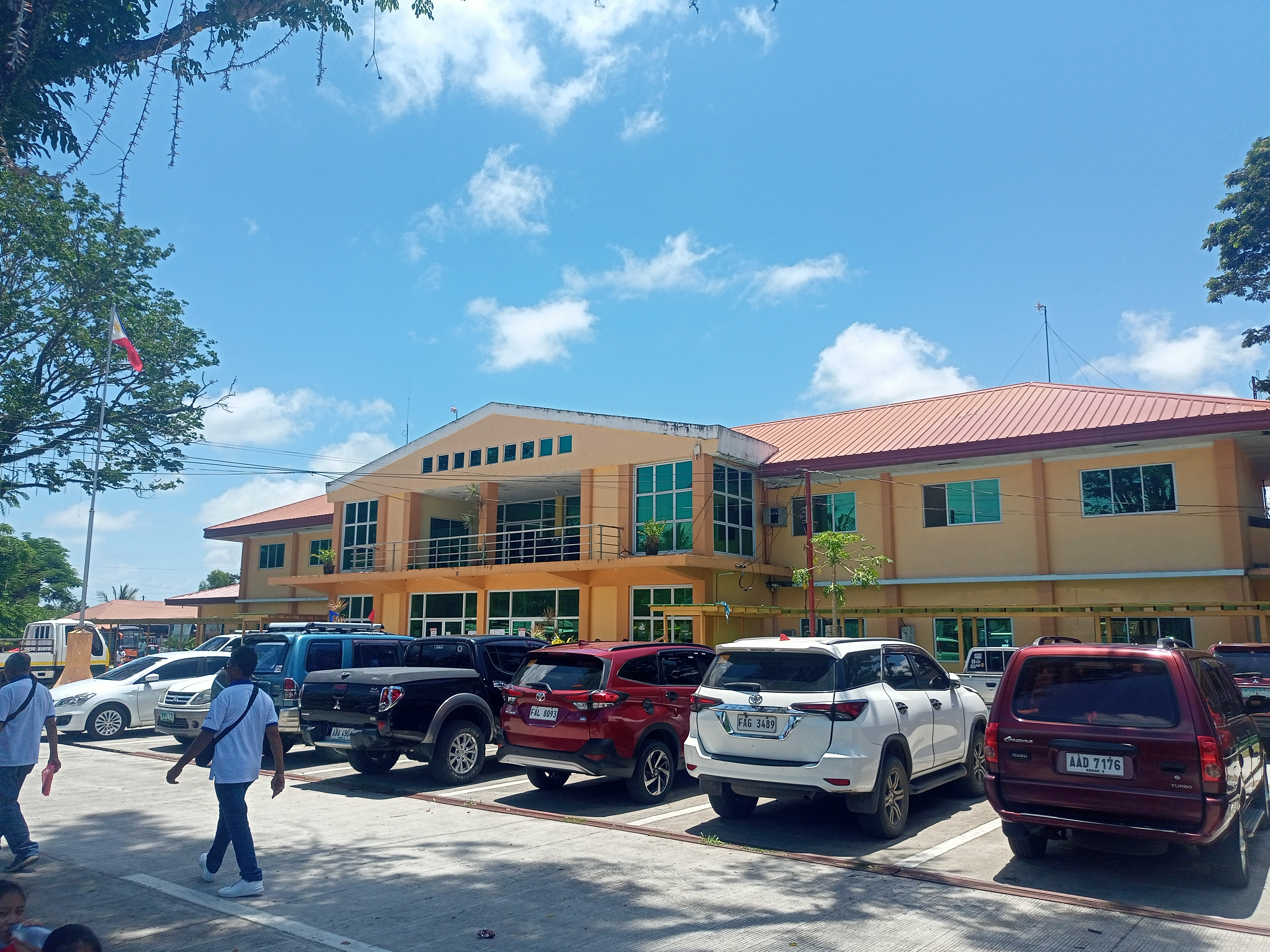
- San Enrique Municipal Hall

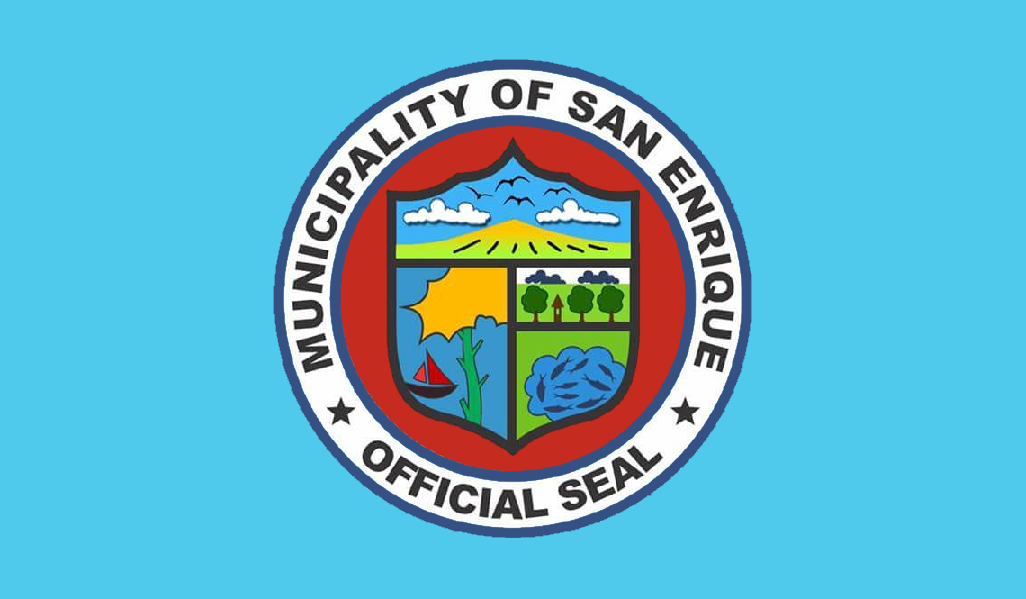
- Flag

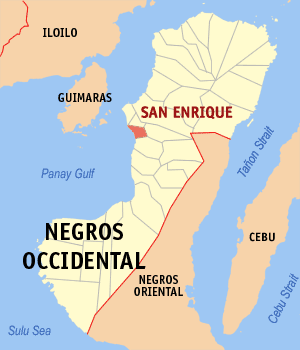
- Map of Negros Occidental with San Enrique highlighted
- Interactive map of San Enrique
- Location within the Philippines
- Coordinates: 10°25′N 122°51′E
- Country: Philippines
- Region: Negros Island Region
- Province: Negros Occidental
- District: 4th district
- Barangays: 10 (see Barangays)

Government
  - Type: Sangguniang Bayan
  - Mayor: Jilson D. Tubillara (UNegA)
  - Vice Mayor: Reynaldo G. Severino (UNegA)
  - Representative: Jeffrey P. Ferrer (NUP)
  - Municipal Council: Members: Jiff Rinson B. Tubillara; Kirk Steven R. Debulgado; Zeus Matthew E. Awacay; Kerwyn Don O. Guillon; Daisy T. Delfinado; Meschille R. Balenario; Shela O. Genoboga; Rafael O. Quitco, Jr.
  - Electorate: 19,701 voters (2025)

Area
  - Total: 28.84 km^{2} (11.14 sq mi)
- Elevation: 4.0 m (13.1 ft)
- Highest elevation: 19 m (62 ft)
- Lowest elevation: 0 m (0 ft)

Population (2024 census)
  - Total: 24,424
  - Density: 846.9/km^{2} (2,193/sq mi)
  - Households: 6,118

Economy
  - Income class: 4th municipal income class
  - Poverty incidence: 18.52% (2023)
  - Revenue: ₱ 122.2 million (2024)
  - Assets: ₱ 322.1 million (2024)
  - Expenditure: ₱ 121.1 million (2024)
  - Liabilities: ₱ 93.67 million (2024)

Service provider
  - Electricity: Negros Occidental Electric Cooperative (NOCECO)
- Time zone: UTC+8 (PST)
- ZIP code: 6104
- PSGC: 064525000
- IDD : area code: +63 (0)34
- Native languages: Hiligaynon; Tagalog

San Enrique, officially the Municipality of San Enrique, is a municipality in the province of Negros Occidental, Philippines. According to the 2024 census, it has a population of 24,424 people.

The town's former name is called "Candaguit", named after the Candaguit River that runs through the town. The town is also notable for its signature delicacy buko pie. Notable tourism destinations include the Wisik Fishing Lagoon Resort, the South Midway Resort, and the Sitio Pasil beach front.

== Geography ==
San Enrique is 35 kilometres (22 mi) from Bacolod and 180 kilometres (110 mi) from Dumaguete.

=== Barangays ===
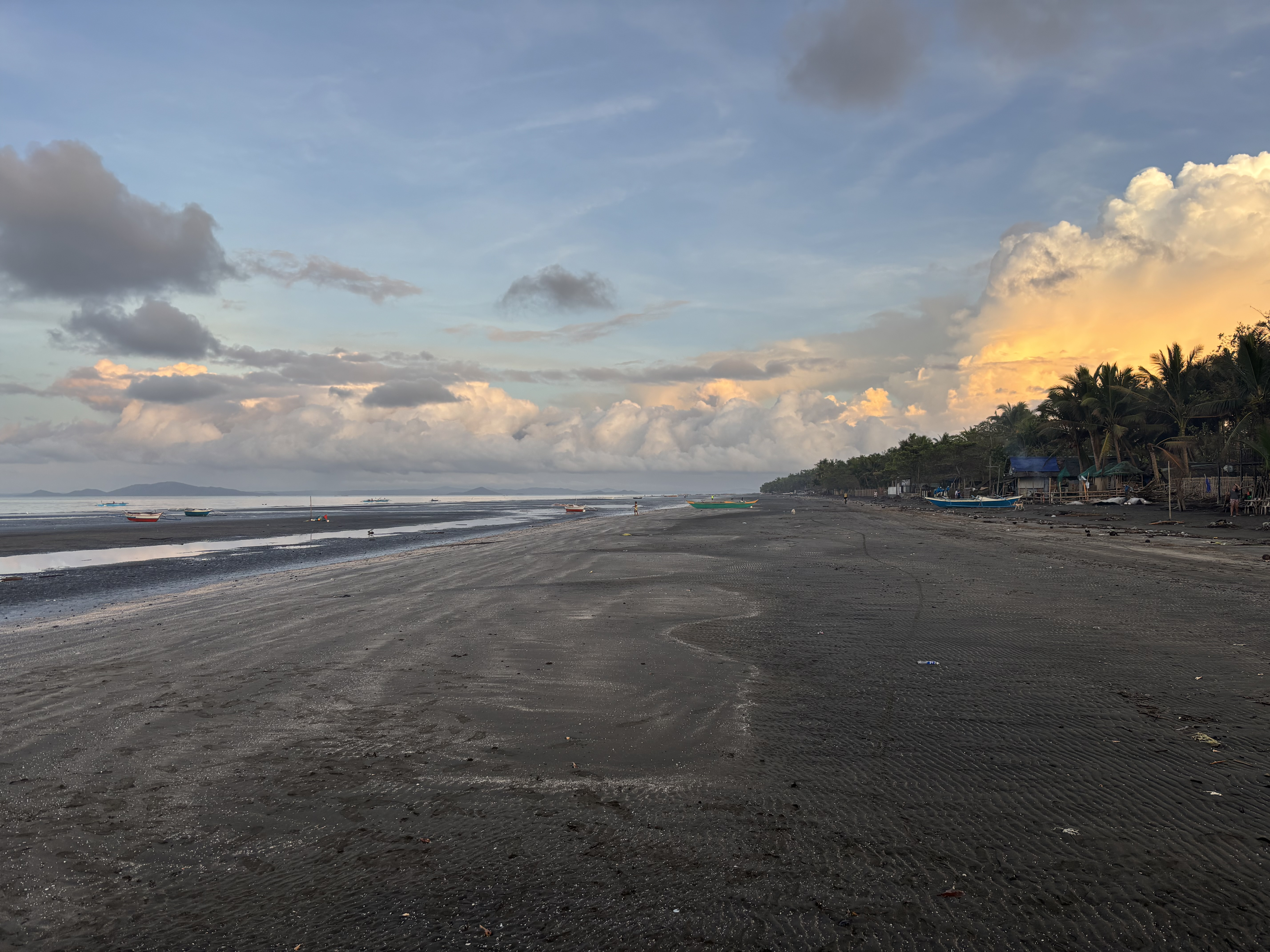
Coastline in barangay Tabao Baybay.

San Enrique is politically subdivided into 10 barangays. Each barangay consists of puroks and some have sitios.

- Bagonawa
- Baliwagan
- Batuan
- Guintorilan
- Nayon
- Poblacion
- Sibucao
- Tabao Baybay
- Tabao Rizal
- Tibsok

=== Climate ===
Climate data for San Enrique, Negros Occidental
Month	Jan	Feb	Mar	Apr	May	Jun	Jul	Aug	Sep	Oct	Nov	Dec	Year
Mean daily maximum °C (°F)	30 (86)	31 (88)	32 (90)	33 (91)	32 (90)	30 (86)	29 (84)	29 (84)	29 (84)	29 (84)	30 (86)	30 (86)	30 (87)
Mean daily minimum °C (°F)	22 (72)	22 (72)	22 (72)	24 (75)	25 (77)	25 (77)	25 (77)	24 (75)	24 (75)	24 (75)	23 (73)	23 (73)	24 (74)
Average precipitation mm (inches)	38 (1.5)	29 (1.1)	55 (2.2)	65 (2.6)	141 (5.6)	210 (8.3)	212 (8.3)	176 (6.9)	180 (7.1)	180 (7.1)	130 (5.1)	70 (2.8)	1,486 (58.6)
Average rainy days	9.0	7.2	11.1	13.5	25.6	28.4	28.9	27.3	26.9	27.7	21.8	13.8	241.2
Source: Meteoblue

== Demographics ==
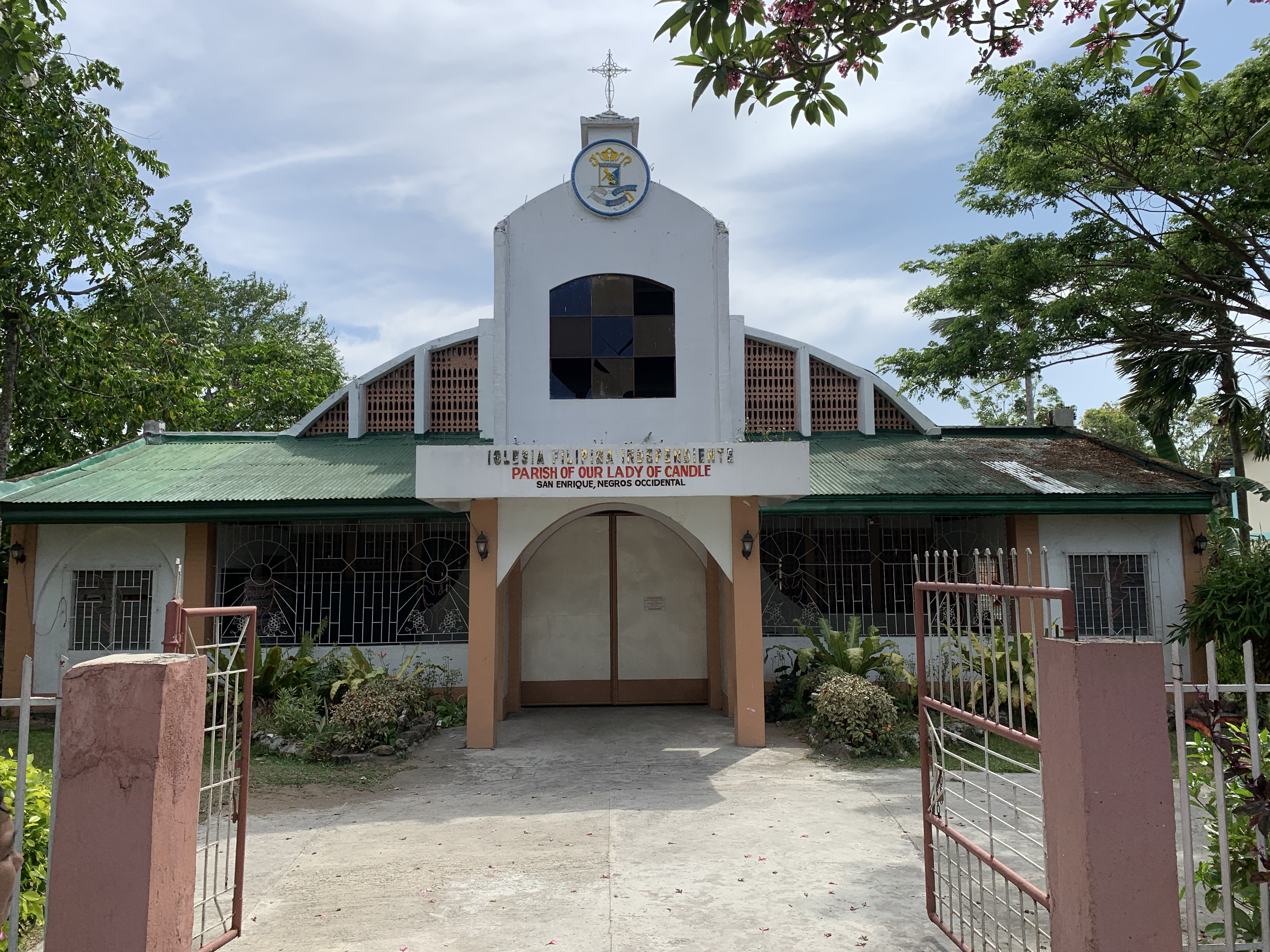
The Parish of Our Lady of Candles of the Philippine Independent Church/Iglesia Filipina Independiente (Aglipayan)

Population census of San Enrique
Year	Pop.	±% p.a.
1903	6,095	—
1939	7,487	+0.57%
1948	8,117	+0.90%
1960	10,476	+2.15%
1970	12,368	+1.67%
1975	14,055	+2.60%
1980	14,662	+0.85%
1990	19,255	+2.76%
1995	20,649	+1.32%
2000	22,091	+1.46%
2007	22,987	+0.55%
2010	23,189	+0.32%
2015	23,907	+0.58%
2020	24,177	+0.24%
2024	24,424	+0.24%
Source: Philippine Statistics Authority

== Economy ==
Poverty incidence of San Enrique (%)

Source: Philippine Statistics Authority

== Education ==
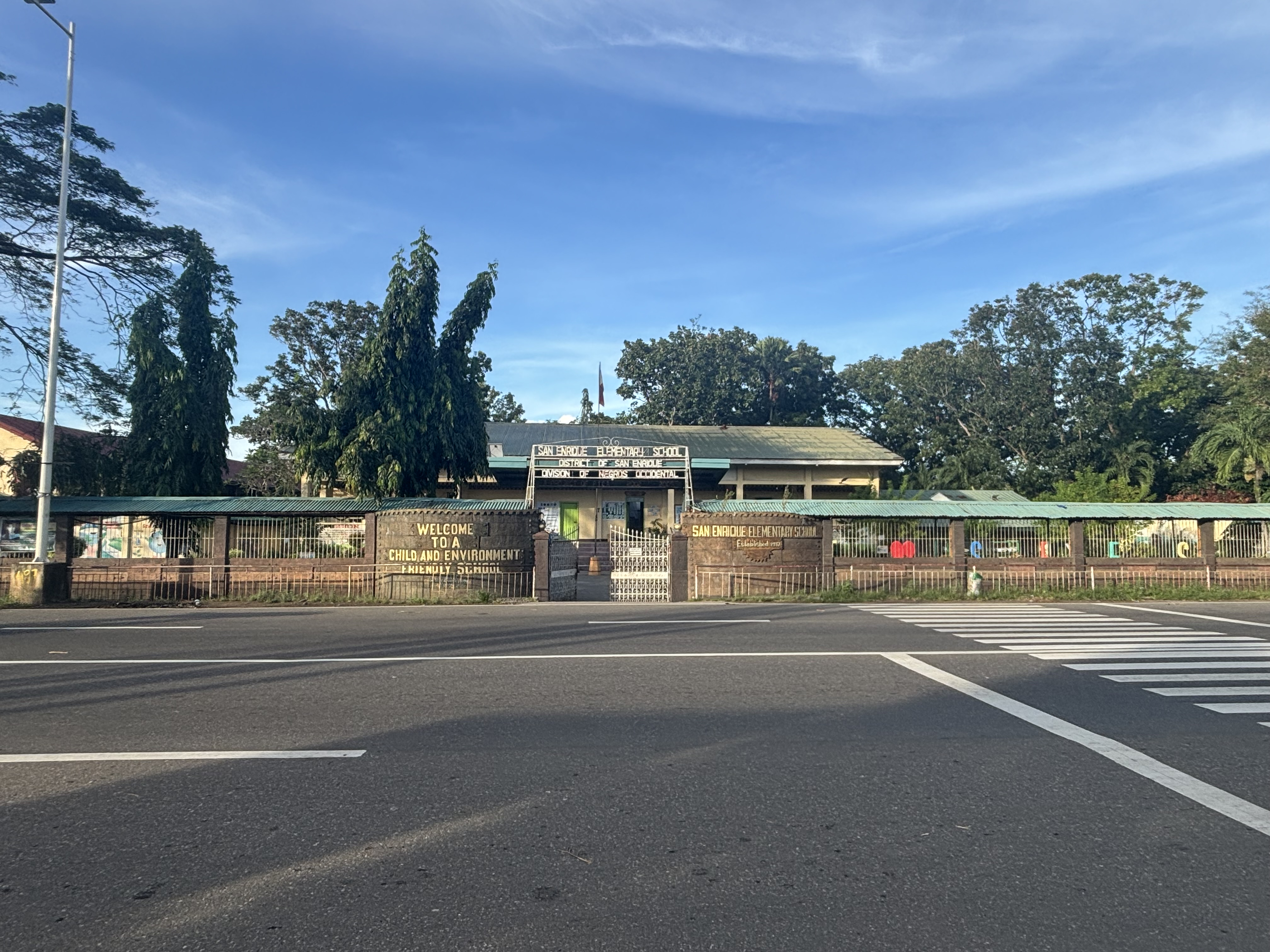
San Enrique Elementary School

The San Enrique Schools District Office governs all educational institutions within the municipality. It oversees the management and operations of all private and public elementary and high schools.

=== Primary and elementary schools ===
- Batuan Elementary School
- Don Esperidion Presbitero Elementary School
- Don Vicente Lopez Elementary School
- Eusebio R. Quitco Elementary School
- Guintorilan Elementary School
- Nasario D. Tupas Elementary School
- Nayon Elementary School
- Our Lady of Purity Kinder School
- San Enrique Elementary School
- San Enrique Seventh-Day Adventist Elementary School
- Sibucao Elementary School
- Tabao Baybay Seventh-Day Adventist Kinder School

=== Secondary schools ===
- San Enrique National High School
- San Enrique Polytechnic Academy
