= Ilog, Negros Occidental =

Municipality in Negros Occidental, Philippines

Ilog
- Municipality
- Municipality of Ilog
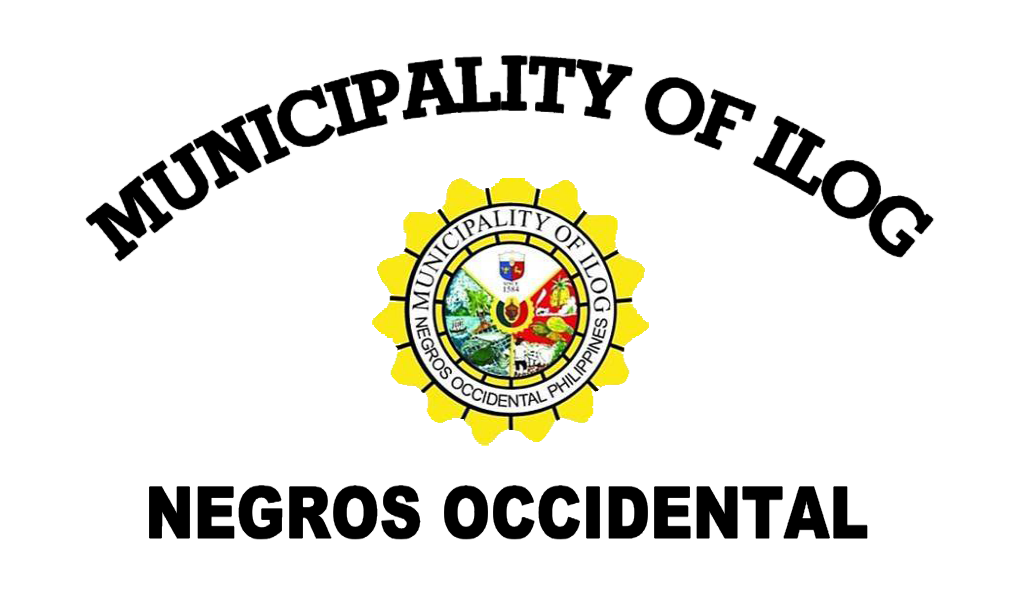
- Flag Seal

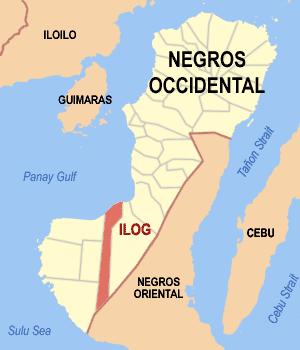
- Map of Negros Occidental with Ilog highlighted
- Interactive map of Ilog
- Location within the Philippines
- Coordinates: 10°02′N 122°46′E
- Country: Philippines
- Region: Negros Island Region
- Province: Negros Occidental
- District: 6th district
- Founded: May 16, 1584
- Barangays: 15 (see Barangays)

Government
  - Type: Sangguniang Bayan
  - Mayor: John Paul K. Alvarez (NPC)
  - Vice Mayor: John Paulo M. Alvarez (NPC)
  - Representative: Mercedes Alvarez (NPC)
  - Municipal Council: Members: Ron E. Cabral; Jerry D. Lopez; Benigno E. Gequillana, Jr.; Joemarie G. Eres; Rene Q. Bandolos; Edsel L. Magbato; Erlinito L. Castillo; Celestino B. Guara, Jr.
  - Electorate: 35,498 voters (2025)

Area
  - Total: 281.70 km^{2} (108.76 sq mi)
- Elevation: 191 m (627 ft)
- Highest elevation: 1,438 m (4,718 ft)
- Lowest elevation: 0 m (0 ft)

Population (2024 census)
  - Total: 63,444
  - Density: 225.22/km^{2} (583.31/sq mi)
  - Households: 14,097

Economy
  - Income class: 1st municipal income class
  - Poverty incidence: 32.69% (2023)
  - Revenue: ₱ 272.9 million (2024)
  - Assets: ₱ 836.7 million (2024)
  - Expenditure: ₱ 306.6 million (2024)
  - Liabilities: ₱ 393.3 million (2024)

Service provider
  - Electricity: Negros Occidental Electric Cooperative (NOCECO)
- Time zone: UTC+8 (PST)
- ZIP code: 6109
- PSGC: 064513000
- IDD : area code: +63 (0)34
- Native languages: Hiligaynon; Tagalog

Ilog, officially the Municipality of Ilog, is a municipality in the province of Negros Occidental, Philippines. According to the 2024 census, it has a population of 63,444 people.

== Etymology ==
The name Ilog (or Ylog, Tagalog for "river") was suggested by a Tagalog guide accompanying the Spanish colonizers, as the area is encircled by the Hilabangan River, the longest river on Negros Island.

== History ==
Founded by the Augustinian friars Gerónimo Marín and Francisco Bustos on May 16, 1584, it was the first capital of the historical military district/province of Negros in the late 18th century and is the second oldest settlement and town in the whole Negros Island, next to Binalbagan. The first inhabitants of Ilog are mostly migrants from Panay island. In 1818, Ilog had 1,791 tributes amounting to 7,645 residents, whereas there were 25 Spanish-Filipino families.

== Geography ==
Ilog is 96 kilometres (60 mi) from Bacolod.

=== Barangays ===
Ilog is politically subdivided into 15 barangays. Each barangay consists of puroks and some have sitios.

- Andulauan
- Balicotoc
- Bocana
- Calubang
- Canlamay
- Consuelo
- Dancalan
- Delicioso
- Galicia
- Manalad
- Pinggot
- Barangay I (Poblacion)
- Barangay II (Poblacion)
- Tabu
- Vista Alegre

== Tourism ==
The Kisi-Kisi Festival is celebrated every 25 March. “Kisi-kisi” is a Hiligaynon term for the fast movement of crustaceans such as fish, prawns, crabs and shrimps that is abundant in the municipality. The main attraction of the festival is the Kisi-Kisi streetdancing parade competition among barangays that pays tribute to its rich marine resources. The town fiesta also honors the Señor Santo Niño as their patron saint, that is why, before the dance parade a re-enactment of Sinulog is staged to show how their village was saved from the Moro pirates. Another exciting event to look forward to during the opening day of the Kisi-Kisi Festival is the "eat-all-you-can oysters" (referred by tourists as Ilog Talaba Festival) which is open to all visitors. Freshly steamed oysters are served on a long bamboo table for those who would like to savor the seafood. Kisi-Kisi was started by then-Councilor Mark G. Vargas to help promote Ilog's tourism.

In 2018, Ilog celebrated the annual Kisi-Kisi fiesta from March 20 to 25 showcasing giant oysters including crustacean seafood like fish, crabs, shrimps, and prawns.

On March 23, 2024, the 18th edition of the Talaba Festival featured the famous eat-all-you-can steamed 3,000 kilograms of oysters placed on a half-kilometer-long bamboo table and served free to visitors and residents. Bong Go and Phillip Salvador upon invitation of Mercedes Alvarez and Mayor John Paul Alvarez, also joined the residents in the annual fiesta.

== Climate ==
Climate data for Ilog, Negros Occidental
Month	Jan	Feb	Mar	Apr	May	Jun	Jul	Aug	Sep	Oct	Nov	Dec	Year
Mean daily maximum °C (°F)	30 (86)	31 (88)	32 (90)	33 (91)	32 (90)	30 (86)	29 (84)	29 (84)	29 (84)	29 (84)	30 (86)	30 (86)	30 (87)
Mean daily minimum °C (°F)	22 (72)	22 (72)	22 (72)	24 (75)	25 (77)	25 (77)	25 (77)	24 (75)	24 (75)	24 (75)	23 (73)	23 (73)	24 (74)
Average precipitation mm (inches)	38 (1.5)	29 (1.1)	55 (2.2)	65 (2.6)	141 (5.6)	210 (8.3)	212 (8.3)	176 (6.9)	180 (7.1)	180 (7.1)	130 (5.1)	70 (2.8)	1,486 (58.6)
Average rainy days	9.0	7.2	11.1	13.5	25.6	28.4	28.9	27.3	26.9	27.7	21.8	13.8	241.2
Source: Meteoblue

== Demographics ==
Population census of Ilog
Year	Pop.	±% p.a.
1903	10,626	—
1918	14,023	+1.87%
1939	20,957	+1.93%
1948	21,645	+0.36%
1960	24,455	+1.02%
1970	30,573	+2.26%
1975	34,977	+2.74%
1980	38,956	+2.18%
1990	46,599	+1.81%
1995	43,905	−1.11%
2000	46,525	+1.25%
2007	53,460	+1.93%
2010	54,423	+0.65%
2015	57,389	+1.02%
2020	59,855	+0.89%
2024	63,444	+1.41%
Source: Philippine Statistics Authority

=== Languages ===
Hiligaynon is the major language of the town, with differences in tone and accent from the Hiligaynon used in Metro Bacolod. Cebuano is also spoken due to Ilog’s proximity to Negros Oriental. Tagalog and English are widely taught.

=== Religion ===
Majority of the people are adherents of the Roman Catholic Church and the Philippine Independent Church.

== Economy ==
Poverty incidence of Ilog (%)

Source: Philippine Statistics Authority

== Notable personalities ==
- Francisco Guilledo — More commonly known as Pancho Villa, First Filipino World Champion boxer, World flyweight champion and IBHOF International Boxing Hall of Fame and WBHOF World Boxing Hall of Fame Inductee
