= List of attacks attributed to the CPP–NPA =

The following is a list of chronological attacks attributed to the Communist Party of the Philippines (CPP), and its armed wing the New People's Army (NPA) which is a major participant in the Communist rebellion in the Philippines.

== List ==
The Armed Forces of the Philippines (AFP) has justified the designation of the Communist Party of the Philippines-New People’s Army (CPP-NPA) as a terrorist organization, citing 1,506 incidents from 2010 to 2020 involving attacks on civilians and military personnel. Brig. Gen. Joel Alejandro Nacnac reported that the CPP-NPA recruited and utilized 544 child soldiers, with some killed, wounded, or abused. The group also carried out 532 attacks on civilian properties, with 2017 recording the highest number. Moreover, the CPP-NPA was responsible for 141 incidents involving anti-personnel mines, causing 224 casualties. "Willful killings" attributed to the group resulted in 373 deaths, with most incidents occurring in 2019. The CPP-NPA is designated as a terrorist organization by multiple countries, including the United States, the European Union, the United Kingdom, Australia, Canada, New Zealand, and the Philippines. The AFP supports the Anti-Terrorism Council's resolutions designating 29 individuals as terrorists and aims to enhance counterterrorism efforts.

=== General list ===
Attack	Date	Location	Deaths	Injuries	CPP-NPA admitted responsibility	Notes	Ref.
Plaza Miranda bombing	August 21, 1971	Plaza Miranda, Manila	9	95	No	Also blamed on the government of President Ferdinand Marcos. An article from The Washington Post alleged that high ranking CPP official said that the bombing was a means to provoke Marcos' administration. CPP founder Jose Maria Sison has denied the communist rebels role in the bombing.	
1976 logging truck attack	November 22, 1976	Enroute Mambusao, Davao Oriental	6	3	No	Suspected communist rebels launched an ambush against a logging truck killing including a municipal police chief.	
1976 Clark Airbase raid	November 22, 1976	Pampanga	—N/a	—N/a	No	Suspected communist rebels staged a raid on 5 barrios situated on the perimeter of the Clark Air Base, seizing 43 weapons from the local CHDF militia.	
Clark Airbase attack	October 28, 1987	Pampanga	—N/a	3	Yes	Militants conducted coordinated attacks near Clark Air Base, killing three U.S. service members.	
Quezon City attack	April 21, 1989	Quezon City	—N/a	1	Yes	A U.S. Army colonel serving as the chief of the Ground Forces Division of the Joint U.S.-Military Assistance Group was ambushed and killed by militants.	
Rano massacre	June 25, 1989	Digos, Davao del Sur	37–39	—N/a	Yes	Occurred in a chapel affiliated with the United Church of Christ in the Philippines. Most of the victims were part of the Ituman anti-communist vigilante group who refused to pay "revolutionary taxes" to the NPA. The NPA accepted responsibility but justified their action as retaliation for previous attacks.	
Clark Airbase attack	May 13, 1990	Pampanga	2	—N/a	Yes	In an attack near Clark Air Base, militants killed two United States service members.	
Quezon province attack	November 19 to 25, 2005	Quezon	several	—N/a	Yes	Attack against Philippine forces killing several soldiers, destroying communication sites, and various government properties	
Iloilo attack	November 24, 2017	Maasin, Iloilo	1	10	Yes	A policeman was killed, and ten others were injured when New People's Army (NPA) rebels ambushed their convoy en route to the Regional Public Safety Battalion in Maasin, Iloilo.	
2021 Masbate City blast	June 8, 2021	Masbate City	2	1	Yes	A bomb, either a landmine, or an improvised explosive device (IED) planted by the NPA to target government forces kills footballer Keith Absalon and his cousin Nolven as they were jogging by. After widespread condemnation, the NPA apologizes for the incident.	
Borongan attack	December 15, 2021	Visayas, and Mindanao	several	3	Yes	Militants ambushed Philippine civilians and government personnel engaged in humanitarian and disaster response efforts ahead of Typhoon Odette.	
Masbate attack	August 12, 2022	Brgy. Bonifacio, Uson, Masbate	—N/a	3	Yes	A bomb attack against unarmed civilians causing injuries of a local official and two others	

=== Assassinations ===
Target	Date	Location	CPP-NPA admitted responsibility	Notes	Ref.
Porferio Branzuela	December 27, 1988	Plaridel, Misamis Occidental	Yes	Mayor of Calamba, Misamis Occidental. Killed along with a police driver in an ambush.	
James Rowe	1989	Quezon City	Yes	American colonel working with the Joint US Military Advisory Group. He and his driver were attacked while en route to Rowe's workplace for being directly involved in the counter-insurgency.	
Javier Hizon	January 5, 1990	Mexico, Pampanga	Yes	Mayor of Mexico. Killed along with a police officer as he left his workplace.	
Conrado Balweg	December 31, 1999	Malibcong, Abra	Yes	Former NPA member and Cordillera People’s Liberation Army leader. Killed at his residence due to "crimes against the Cordilleran people and the Revolutionary Movement" and his role in splitting the communist movement in the Cordilleras	
Carlito Pentecostes Jr.	April 21, 2014	Gonzaga, Cagayan	Yes	Mayor of Gonzaga. Killed in front of the municipal hall after a flag-raising ceremony for his alleged role in the arrest of a rebel leader and for supporting black sand mining in his town.	
Mario Okinlay	2014	Impasugong, Bukidnon	Yes	Mayor of Impasugong. Killed in a roadside ambush for supporting the government's counter-insurgency program.	

== See also ==
- Timeline of the communist rebellion in the Philippines
