= Kublai Millan =

Filipino sculptor and painter

- Born: Rey Mudjahid Ponce Millan; July 8, 1974 (age 52); Cotabato City, Philippines
- Education: University of the Philippines Diliman
- Known for: Sculpture, Painting, Art photography, Digital Arts

Rey Mudjahid Ponce Millan (born 8 July 1974), better known as Kublai Millan or Kublai, is a Filipino painter, sculptor, curator, and cultural mover from Mindanao. He is known for his monumental sculptures, his colorful paintings, and his culture and arts community engagements.

One of Mindanao's most prolific creatives, he is the founder of Mindanao Art, the largest art event in Mindanao (and one of the largest in the Philippines). Among his most recognizable monuments are the Durian Monument in Francisco Bangoy International Airport, sculptures at People's Park in Davao City, Christ the King Sculptures in Tagum City, and the Agong House in Kapatagan, Digos City.

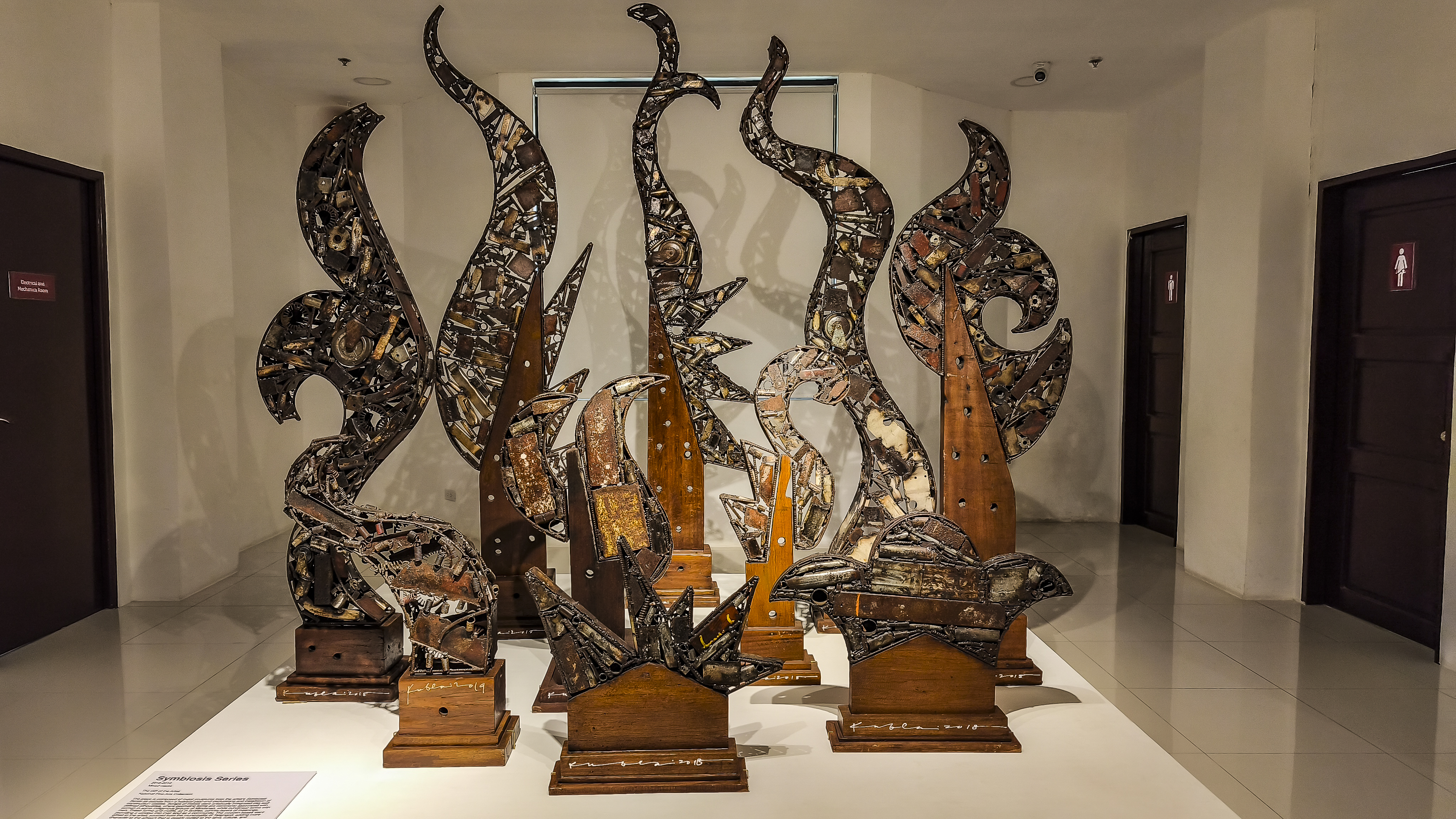
Kublai Millan's Symbiosis Series exhibited at the National Museum of the Philippines-Davao City, August 2026

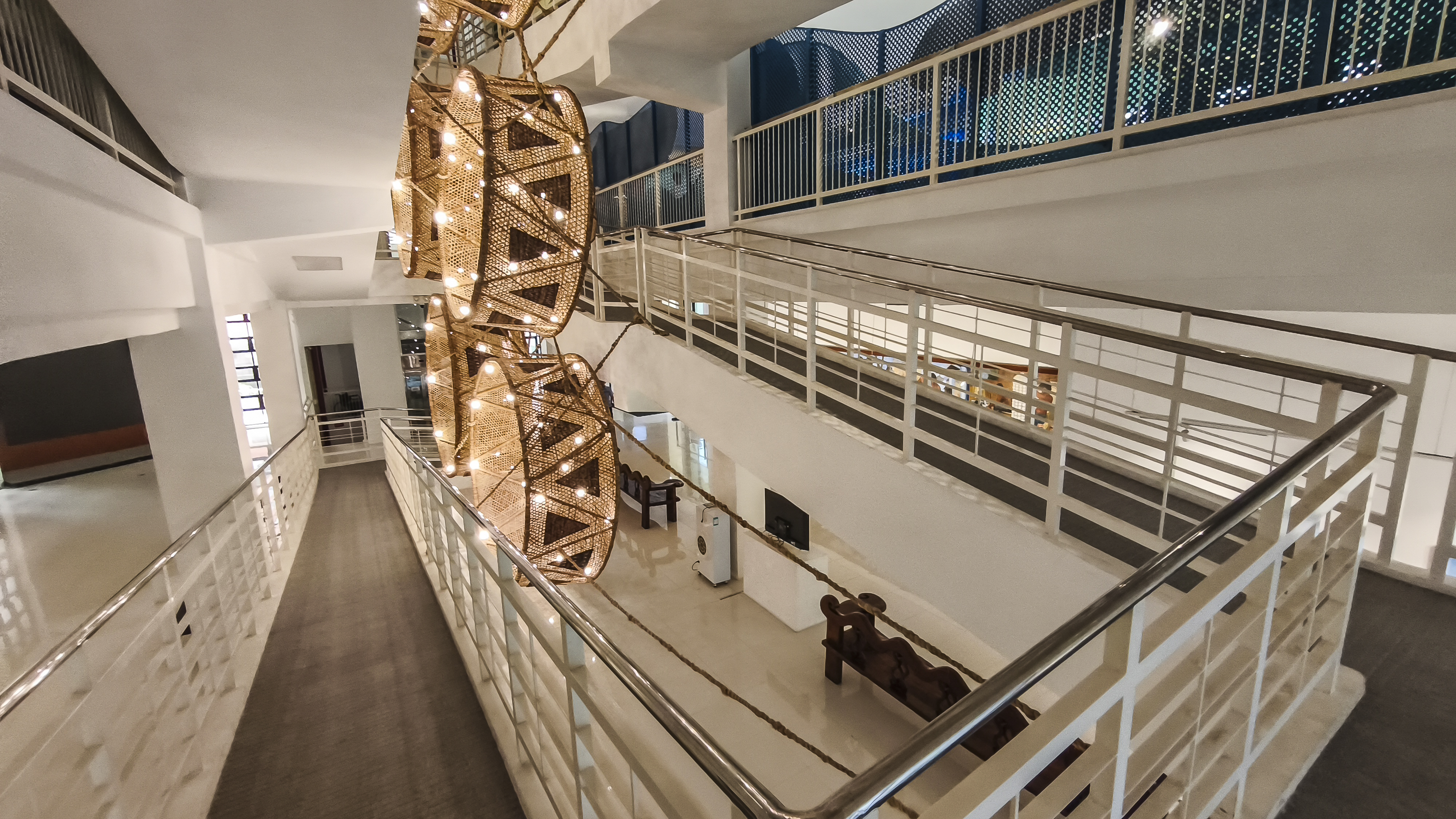
Kublai Millan's Ahungan ng Pagkakaisa at the National Museum of the Philippines-Davao City, August 2026

== Personal background ==
Kublai was born in Cotabato City but grew up in Davao City. He is a descendant of settlers from Ilocos. His paternal grandfather, Simeon F. Millan, was one of the two editors of the 1952 Cotabato Guidebook (a major source in Mindanao historiography). His father, Rey Ernesto Millan, was a leading mover in the bamboo industry.

He studied Fine Arts at the University of the Philippines Diliman.

After graduating, he returned to Davao City, painting and sculpting subjects relating to the culture of his home island. Mindanao has been the dominant subject matter of his art.

Kublai started his career when he made all the artworks both inside and outside of his family's hotel, Ponce Suites, in Davao City, which is managed by his mother. He has since produced more public monuments and murals, and along the way his paintings have gained the attention of collectors.

In 2010, he was commissioned to make the Nativity Scene at St. Peter's Square in the Vatican, the first non-Italian artist to be thus commissioned

In 2017 Davao City conferred him with the Datu Bago Award, and in 2022 he was given the Gador Award by the Cultural Center of the Philippines for his work in promoting Mindanao's culture and arts.

== Monuments ==
Millan is noted for his many public monuments, having built one in almost every province in Mindanao.

Among his most prominent monuments are the Durian monument outside Francisco Bangoy International Airport, the monuments at Davao City's People's Park, Davao City's Eagle Pavilion and Clock Tower in front of Davao Cathedral, the Roundball in Surallah, South Cotabato, the Bangkapayapaan Monument in General Santos City, the Kampilan monument in Sultan Kudarat, Maguindanao del Norte, and the "Risen Christ" in a church in Tagum City. Recently, he created the Rano Memorial to commemorate the Rano massacre in Digos City, Davao del Sur; the monument for Kabang in Zamboanga City; the Bantayog ng Kapayapaan in Camp Aguinaldo, and a monument for the fallen soldiers of the Siege of Marawi

A recurring characteristic of his monuments is the use of material with interesting provenance. This is the case with his Carabao monuments (in Davao City and Tagum City), which use upcycled beds from the Southern Philippines Medical Center, and with the Tears from Heaven Monument in Marawi, which is made with repurposed roofs from Ground Zero in Marawi.

== Paintings ==
Millan has produced several thousand paintings. His work has been exhibited across the Philippines and internationally.

His earlier body of works, which reveal his development as artist, are housed in Ponce Suites in Davao. It is his more recent and more colourful oeuvre of paintings (called "Kinublay" by writer Karlo Antonio Galay David) that are more widely known.

The oeuvre draws stylistic and creative inspiration equally from both Mindanao's visual traditions and from foreign and contemporary influences (particularly the works Joan Miro and Abdulmari Imao).

The largest series of this oeuvre, 'Probinsaya', is in collections all over the country. His most iconic paintings are the 'Lullabyes,' his visual representations of peace. They are most prominently visible as murals on the Davao City National High School's walls.

Some known collectors of Millan's paintings include Vice President Sara Duterte, Senators Ronald dela Rosa, Nancy Binay and Francis Escudero, and Davao City Mayor Sebastian Duterte.

== Community engagement ==
Aside from making his artworks, Millan is also an active cultural mover in Mindanao, with years of engagement in various communities all over the island. Many of his monuments also come with community development projects.

One of his longest partnerships is with the Talaandig of Lantapan, Bukidnon. Collaborating with Datu Waway Saway, he played a key supporting role in developing Talaandig Soil Painting.

Millan is the President of Lawig Diwa, Inc., through which he leads in the organizing of projects that support arts in Mindanao. One of its flagship projects is Mindanao Art, the biggest art fair in Mindanao. Through the foundation he also organizes engagement initiatives with Mindanao's cultural communities, rebel returnees, farmers, fishermen, and other sectors outside the art scene, as well as conducting workshops and mentoring programs for the island's emerging artists.
