= Rano massacre =

1989 killing of civilians in the Philippines

- Part of Communist rebellion in the Philippines
- Davao del Sur (Philippines)
Date	June 25, 1989
Location	Sitio Rano, Barangay Binaton, Digos, Davao del Sur, Philippines

Belligerents
Ituman (Note: Mostly unarmed. At least five including Ruben Ayap were lightly armed.)	New People's Army

Commanders and leaders
Ruben Ayap	

Strength
Undetermined	~100

Casualties and losses
See below	2 (claimed)
- 37–39 killed (Note: Conflicting reports: Reported number of deaths ranges from 37 to 39. Two NPA members were claimed to have been killed by a survivor, whose supposed remains were said to have been carried away by the rebels according to the military. The Rano Memorial recognizes 39 named victims (22 children, 10 women, and seven men))

The Rano massacre, also known as the Digos massacre, refers to the aftermath of an incident which occurred in the village of Rano in Barangay Binaton, Digos, Davao del Sur on June 25, 1989 which resulted to the death of 39 people. The New People's Army claimed responsibility for the deaths but insisted that anti-communist vigilantes among the victims fired at them first.

== Background ==
The Rano massacre occurred on June 25, 1989 at a chapel affiliated with the Protestant United Church of Christ in the Philippines (UCCP) in sitio Lower Rano in Barangay Binaton in Digos. Most of the victims were members of the Obo and Bagobo ethnic groups who were part of the Ituman anti-communist vigilante group.

The New People's Army (NPA) were blamed for the deaths. According to the Philippine Constabulary, they were told that the villagers believed that the NPA were not pleased that the churchgoers have formed an anti-communist vigilante group and had refused to pay "revolutionary taxes" to the Communist rebel group.

The NPA made requests for a dialogue with Ruben Ayap, also known as Kumander Maya, the leader of the Ituman vigilante group in Rano but such requests were left unanswered. The rebel group decided to hold a mass meeting at Rano despite Ayap's disinterest. Ayap who was attending Sunday School in the chapel at that time, sent Cesar Endar to meet the NPA outside. Endar and the NPA exchanged fire despite the NPA's claims that they intend to initiate talks. The gunfire prompted Ayap to send the parishioners with him to evacuate to Abadya Ayap's house at the back of the chapel. Gunfight between the Ituman and the NPA persisted for hours. The NPA attempted to initiate talks again but the Ituman responded with gunfire from inside the house. The NPA attempted to enter the house but was met with resistance and the rebels resumed shooting at the house.

The NPA were able to enter the house and found many dead bodies. They queried a survivor who told them that Ruben Ayap did not allow anyone inside to leave or surrender. The corpses of Clemente Ayap and Abadya Ayap were beheaded by the NPA. The NPA left in the afternoon before the Philippine military arrived at the site.

The NPA later admitted to be involved in the massacre, but reasoned that they were forced resort to armed violence after anti-communist vigilantes among the eventual victims fired at them first.

== Victims ==
There are conflicting reports regarding the number of deaths with 37 to 39 people killed in the incident. Most of the victims were unarmed, but some were armed, albeit lightly relative to the NPA, with at least a pistol, two shotguns, a single-shot rifle and bolo knives.

== Aftermath ==
The United Church of Christ in the Philippines (UCCP) after conducting its probe condemned the NPA saying that the incident "raised grave doubts" about the NPA's consistent efforts "toward social transformation based on justice." and accused the rebel group of violating the Geneva Convention The UCCP also condemned the Philippine government, after receiving reports that the army has been using its chapels as bases of operation and organizing its congregations into anti-communist vigilante groups.

The massacre damaged the reputation of the New People's Army challenging the NPA's image as "defenders of people´s sacred hopes and deepest aspirations". The massacre occurred weeks after the media reported that the NPA had tortured and killed hundreds of its own members over suspicion that they might be "deep penetration agents" or spies for the Philippine government as well as the assassination of US Colonel James N. Rowe in April which was condemned by several national newspapers.

Immediately after the massacre, killings of suspected NPA members increased in the Davao area and the announcement that 200 Ituman members would be part of the Civilian Armed Forces Geographical Unit, an irregular component of the Philippine military.

== Commemoration ==
The Rano massacre has been commemorated annually. In 2021, the Rano Memorial and Bale Kasunay Tribal Peace Hall was unveiled by the Kapiid Ka Banua (KKBI) Tribal Council and the National Intelligence Coordinating Agency (NICA). The monument which has a leaf motif, was designed by Davao artist Kublai Millan, "life, renewal, and transformation" of the Bagobo-Tagabawa, after the event. A marker is also present at the memorial site which list the names of the massacre's 39 victims.
