= Killing of Keith and Nolven Absalon =

2021 murders in Masbate City, Philippines

Coordinates: 12.440°N 123.565°E

- Part of the ongoing communist rebellion in the Philippines
- Date: June 8, 2021
- Location: Anas, Masbate City, Philippines
- Deaths: 2 (Keith and Nolven Absalon)
- Injuries: 1
- Arrests: 2
- Suspects: 24
- Charges: murder / frustrated murder

Keith Absalon, a collegiate footballer who played for the FEU Tamaraws in the University Athletic Association of the Philippines (UAAP) and his cousin, Nolven, were killed when they ran over an explosive, reportedly a landmine or an improvised explosive device, that was set up by the New People's Army (NPA) in June 2021 in Masbate City, Philippines.

== Background ==
=== Victims ===
Keith Absalon, one of the victims of the blast, is a Filipino footballer who has played for the Philippines national under-19 team which participated in the 2018 AFF U-19 Youth Championship in Indonesia. A midfielder, he was also a player of Malaya FC and the Far Eastern University (FEU) varsity football team. He was named as Most Valuable player for FEU in the junior division in UAAP Season 78. he was a starter for the senior team in UAAP Season 82 which was halted due to the COVID-19 pandemic. He was also a recipient of the Super Kid Award which was conferred by the Philippine Olympic Committee in 2017.

Keith's cousin Nolven Absalon, then a labor leader of Sentro ng mga Nagkakaisa at Progresibong Manggagawa (SENTRO), also died from the blast while his 16-year old son sustained injuries. The two Absalons who died were laid to rest at the Nursery Cemetery in Masbate City on June 13, 2021.

=== Explosive used ===
The explosive involved in the incident is unclear; the bomb used is interchangeably described as a landmine, an anti-personnel mine (APM), or as an improvised explosive device (IED). The National Democratic Front of the Philippines denounced unspecific characterization by the military of the explosive involved as anti-personnel mine without any qualifier; saying that the NPA only used command-detonated landmines, which required to be manually activated, which the group insist are "legitimate tools of warfare".

== Incident ==
Keith and Nolven Absalon along with their family and relatives were cycling to Barangay B. Titong in the Masbate City proper on June 6, 2021. At Purok 4 in Barangay Anas of the same city, a bomb planted by the New People's Army (NPA) exploded killing Keith and Nolven Absalon and injuring the latter's 16-year old son. According to a police report, a witness said that the explosion was "followed by a series of gunshots".

The death certificate of the two victims indicate that they died of hemorrhagic shock with the underlying case as "gunshot wounds and blast injuries".

According to the Romulo Jallores and Jose Rapsing Commands of the NPA, the planted explosive was part of their offensive against government forces and did not intend to harm the Absalons.

== Aftermath ==
=== Response ===
The New People's Army (NPA) issued a statement apologizing for the "unnecessary and unintended" deaths of Keith and Nolven Absalon. The Absalons rejected the apology. The Department of the Interior and Local Government (DILG), the Armed Forces of the Philippines, the Philippine National Police, as well as the Commission on Human Rights (CHR) urged the NPA to surrender those who were involved in the incident so that they could be tried in court. The CHR also condemned the NPA saying the use of landmine violates international humanitarian law and launched its own investigation on the incident. The NPA has refused to surrender those responsible from the blast, insisting that the organization has authority over their members.

The Makabayan bloc of the House of Representatives condemned the blast which they characterize as a "military action" by the NPA while also welcoming the communist group's apology saying they are looking forward to "full and impartial investigation into the incident". They also urged the victims of the blast to file complaint to the Joint Monitoring Committee (JMC) which deals with cases on alleged non-compliance of the Communist Party of the Philippines (CPP) and the NPA, or the government and its security forces on the Comprehensive Agreement on Respect for Human Rights and International Humanitarian Law (CARHRIHL). It also called for the "full reactivation" of the JMC and the resumption of peace talks between the Philippine government and the CPP-NPA citing "The Absalons' deaths and the rising number of CARHRIHL violations by the PNP-AFP".

The DILG in response to the Makabayan bloc's statements, said that the JMC has long been defunct for years already and said the Makabayan bloc is misleading the Absalons. The department also urged the Makabayan bloc and its allies to pressure the NPA to surrender those who were responsible for the blast and to condemn the group for their production and usage of anti-personnel mines. The Office of the Presidential Adviser on the Peace Process also rejected the Makabayan bloc's calls for the resumption of peace talks, saying that the localized peace negotiations and "whole-of-nation" approach of the national government to the Communist rebellion is already working. Akbayan and SENTRO also criticized the Makabayan bloc's reaction, and dared the Makabayan bloc to condemn all type of violence committed by the NPA.

Hermogenes Esperon Jr., speaking as the vice chairman of the National Task Force to End Local Communist Armed Conflict (NTF-ELCAC), concluded that the NPA really intended to kill Keith Absalon, due to his popularity as an athlete and his sports program for the youth – which Esperon says competes with the NPA's youth recruitment program.

A nationwide cycling event initiated by various local and national government agencies named the "Bike for Peace and Justice for Keith Absalon" was held on July 17, 2021, as a protest against the CPP-NPA.

=== Charges and arrests ===
A team of investigators from the Masbate City Police Station filed murder and frustrated murder charges against 24 individuals. A 22-year-old woman, daughter of an NPA leader, native of Cawayan and an aspiring public teacher, was arrested on June 22, 2021 for allegedly being involved in the blast.

In January 2025, the NTF-ELCAC revealed that the Bicol Region Philippine National Police arrested an NPA officer alias "Onang," in San Fernando, Masbate. The arrest warrants of the RTC, Masbate City set the bail at PHP 200,000 for each accused charged with genocide, International Humanitarian Law and other crimes against humanity (R.A. 9851).

== See also ==
- 2019 Borongan ambush
