= 2025 Magang tornado =

2025 Philippine tornado

- The tornado captured from a two-story residential building, passing through a subdivision in Magang, Daet

Meteorological history
- Date: September 14, 2025
- Formed: c. 6:10 a.m. PhST (UTC+8:00)
- Duration: 20 minutes

IF2+ tornado
- on the International Fujita scale

EF3 tornado
- on the Enhanced Fujita scale
- Path length: 2.5 km (1.55 mi)
- Highest winds: ≥ 220 km/h (137 mph)

Overall effects
- Fatalities: 2
- Injuries: 2
- Areas affected: Daet, Camarines Norte
- Part of tornadoes of 2025

In the early morning hours of September 14, 2025, a destructive and deadly rain-wrapped IF2.5 tornado swept through the town of Daet in the Philippines. The event, commonly known as either the Magang tornado or the Daet tornado, was part of an extremely rare and localized tornado outbreak that affected the province of Camarines Norte. It is one of five tornadoes identified in the outbreak and the strongest recorded among them. The tornado formed from a supercell within a mesoscale convective system, associated with an atypical easterly severe weather pattern in the region.

The tornado tracked around 2.0 km (1.2 mi) to 2.5 km (1.6 mi) across the village of Magang, striking a subdivision where most of the damage occurred, before approaching the adjacent village of Bibirao. It devastated the two villages, damaging or destroying multiple residential houses, commercial buildings, and infrastructures; as well as snapping or uprooting several trees. It killed two people and injured two others, as well as damaging a combined total of 121 houses. The tornado was rated as IF2.5 on the International Fujita scale (IF-scale) by the Severe Weather Archive of the Philippines after a damage analysis identified it to have reached estimated wind speeds of 220 km/h (137 mph). It is the strongest tornado recorded by far, and the first and only EF3-equivalent tornado in the country.

== Background ==
Approximately 12 to 24 tornadoes hit the Philippines every year. During the wet season associated with the southwest monsoon, tornadic activity across the country increases, with higher concentrations recorded between the months of June and August. Most of these tornadoes occur on the regional tornado hotspots: Central Luzon and the Greater Manila Area, Panay and Cebu in Visayas, and Central Mindanao. Oftentimes, these originate from localized supercell thunderstorms, tropical cyclones, or waterspouts that moved inland. In 2025, there were a total of 141 reported tornadoes across the country—approximately 73 of which were recorded in Luzon.

== Meteorological synopsis ==
Prior to the event, an atypical easterly severe weather pattern, characterized by warm, moist southeasterly flow and strong low-level wind shear associated with an easterly wave developed over eastern Luzon. The upstream segment of the inverted trough provided a convective storm environment which enhanced a low-level rotation.

A low-pressure area near Casiguran, Sorsogon at 2:00 a.m. PhST (18:00 UTC); approximately four hours before the event

At 5.00 a.m. PhST (21:00 UTC), the Philippine Atmospheric, Geophysical, and Astronomical Services Administration issued a heavy rainfall warning across several provinces in Southern Luzon due to an approaching low-pressure area. Upper-air soundings from the ECMWF ERA5 identified a rapidly destabilizing atmospheric profile in the region. The convective available potential energy (CAPE) was measured at around 1,336 J/kg and low-level 0–3 kilometer CAPE (3CAPE) at 87 J/kg, signaling a moderately unstable atmosphere. Storm-relative helicity (SRH) in the 0–1 kilometer layer was also measured at 75 m²/s², which indicated a weak low-level wind shear. Between 5:40 a.m. (21:40 UTC) and 6:00 a.m. PhST (22:00 UTC), a deep moist convection organized into a tropical mesoscale convective system. Observations from a weather radar in Daet at 6:10 a.m. PhST (22:10 UTC) confirmed three distinct tornadic supercells operating within the mesoscale convective system: Magang, Cahabaan, and Napilihan respectively—although Napilihan was likely to be brief. Peak CAPE measurements were observed around this time with values reaching 2,167 J/kg, while 3CAPE reaches 115 J/kg, indicating an explosive updraft and a strong low-level rotation. The 0–1km SRH was observed to be at 68 m²/s²; while considered to be weak, the area around Daet is composed of a low-lying coastal plain bordered by a mountainous high terrain: notably Mount Bagacay, Mount Labo, and Mount Balagbag. It allowed highly favorable atmospheric conditions for a convective thunderstorm environment and created a terrain-anchored convergence–vorticity zone, analogous to the Denver Convergence Vorticity Zone in the United States.

== Tornado summary ==
The tornado first touched down at 6:10 a.m. PhST (22:10 UTC) on an agricultural field in Magang, tracking northwest as it headed straight towards the Happy Homes Fairview 2 subdivision. It travelled between 2.0 km (1.2 mi) and 2.5 km (1.6 mi) on a southeast-to-northwest trajectory as it swept through the densely-populated residential areas, causing significant damage. In the International Fujita scale, one- to two-story residential buildings with roofs that had a sturdiness class D were completely ripped and blown away. Weaker houses suffered partial or near-total collapse. A local church and a high school building also sustained damages. Two three-wheeled public utility vehicles were blown away or overturned completely, and a private jeep skidded. Several electrical transmission poles along the subdivision road were either bent or snapped, knocking the power lines onto the ground. Significant vegetational damage was also observed; large, strong trees were snapped or uprooted. One large, well-rooted tree was snapped and stripped of its branches—which led to the tornado's IF2.5 (EF3-equivalent) rating, given the degree of debranching and tree sturdiness. The tornado continued moving northwest towards the neighboring village of Bibirao, striking multiple houses.

A smaller IF0 (EF0-equivalent) tornado in Lag-on, Daet, occurred minutes before the IF2.5 (EF3-equivalent) tornado in Magang

Between 6:20 a.m. (22:20 UTC) and 06:30 a.m. (22:30 UTC) PhST, the circulation of the tornado weakened. The tornado vortex signature (TVS) became less prominent, before dissipating completely.

Prior to this tornado, another IF0 (EF0-equivalent) touched down in Lag-on at around 6:00 a.m. PhST (22:00 UTC). It was captured on camera by several residents as it travelled for approximately 1.0 km (0.62 mi) in an open field. This tornado had no observable damages. Three other tornadoes occurred alongside the Magang and Lag-on tornadoes in Daet, but unlike these two, they were not widely-documented nor reported across news outlets and social media; rather, they were identified through radar-derived signatures. These include the IF1-rated (EF1-equivalent) Cahabaan tornado in Talisay, another IF1-rated Napilihan tornado in Vinzons, and the IF0-rated Mampili tornado in Basud. Although, the Mampili tornado was classified as a potential landspout due to its non-supercellular origin.

== Aftermath ==
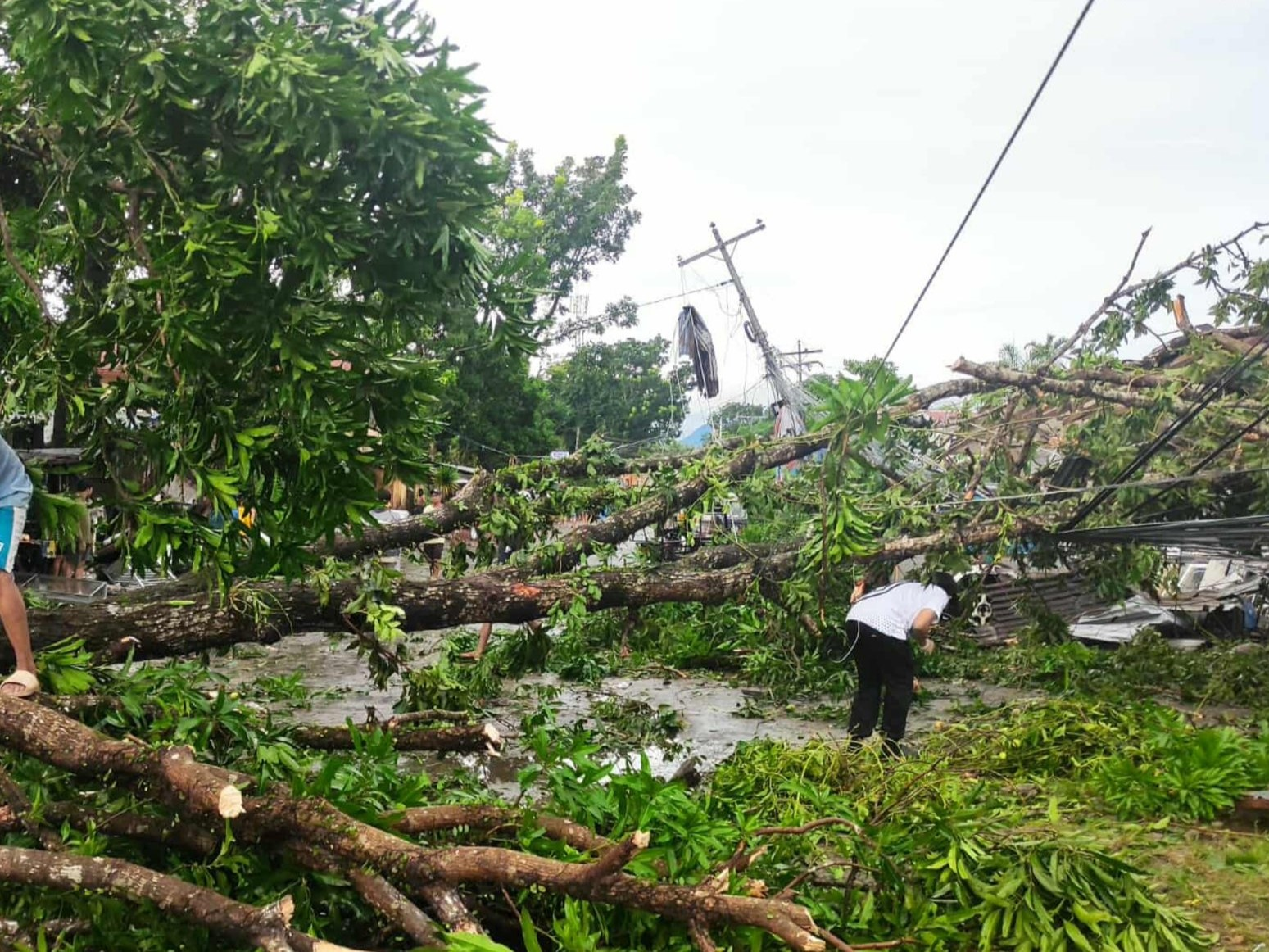
IF2.5 tree damage in Magang, Daet

The tornado caused extensive destruction across Daet, with a total of 121 houses either damaged or destroyed. A 37-year-old woman and her 13-year-old nephew was killed after a large 20-year-old mahogany tree toppled towards them while they were opening their store. Two women also sustained minor injuries after their houses in Bibirao were blown away. No evacuations were ordered and residents began repairing their houses. The Municipal Disaster Risk Reduction and Management Council conducted an investigation on the affected vicinity. The Department of Public Works and Highways and the Philippine Coast Guard began clearing operations after several trees were uprooted and debris were scattered. Several roads in the villages of Lag-on and Mancruz were rendered impassable due to toppled trees and dangling electrical wires, causing heavy traffic. The Department of Social Welfare and Development also conducted field assessments, particularly in the village of Magang and the neighboring village of Bibirao, and gave financial assistance worth a total of ₱187,319.25 ($3,274 USD) towards 121 affected families or a total of 605 individuals. Emergency relief and psychosocial support were provided to tornado victims.

== Other tornadoes ==
Confirmed tornadoes by International Fujita rating
| IFU | IF0 | IF0.5 | IF1 | IF1.5 | IF2 | IF2.5 | IF3 | IF4 | IF5 | Total |
|---|---|---|---|---|---|---|---|---|---|---|
| 0 | 2 | 0 | 2 | 0 | 0 | 1 | 0 | 0 | 0 | 5 |

List of confirmed tornadoes – Sunday, September 14, 2025 (Note: All dates are based on the local time zone where the tornado touched down; however, all times are in Coordinated Universal Time for consistency.)
| IF# | Location | Municipality | Province | Start Coord. | Time (UTC) | Path length | Max width |
|---|---|---|---|---|---|---|---|
| IF0 | Lag-on | Daet | Camarines Norte | 14.118017°N 122.947934°E | 22:00 | 1.0 km (0.62 mi) | Unknown |
| IF0 | Brief tornado. No damages were observed due to its path on open terrain. | | | | | | |
| IF1 | Cahabaan | Talisay | Camarines Norte | 14.119437°N 122.909452°E | 22:10 | 3.2 km (2.0 mi) | Unknown |
| IF1 | Identified through radar signatures. Significant vegetational damage was observed. | | | | | | |
| IF1 | Napilihan | Vinzons | Camarines Norte | 14.184061°N 122.878037°E | 22:10 | Unknown | Unknown |
| IF1 | Brief tornado; identified through radar signatures. | | | | | | |
| IF0 | Mampili | Basud | Camarines Norte | 14.076904°N 122.974973°E | 22:10 | Unknown | Unknown |
| IF0 | Potential brief non-supercellular landspout; identified through radar signatures. No damages were observed due to its path on open terrain. | | | | | | |

== See also ==
- 1990 Manukan tornado, the deadliest tornado in Philippine history
- List of Philippine tornadoes
- List of F3, EF3, and IF3 tornadoes (2020–present)
