= List of Philippine tornadoes =

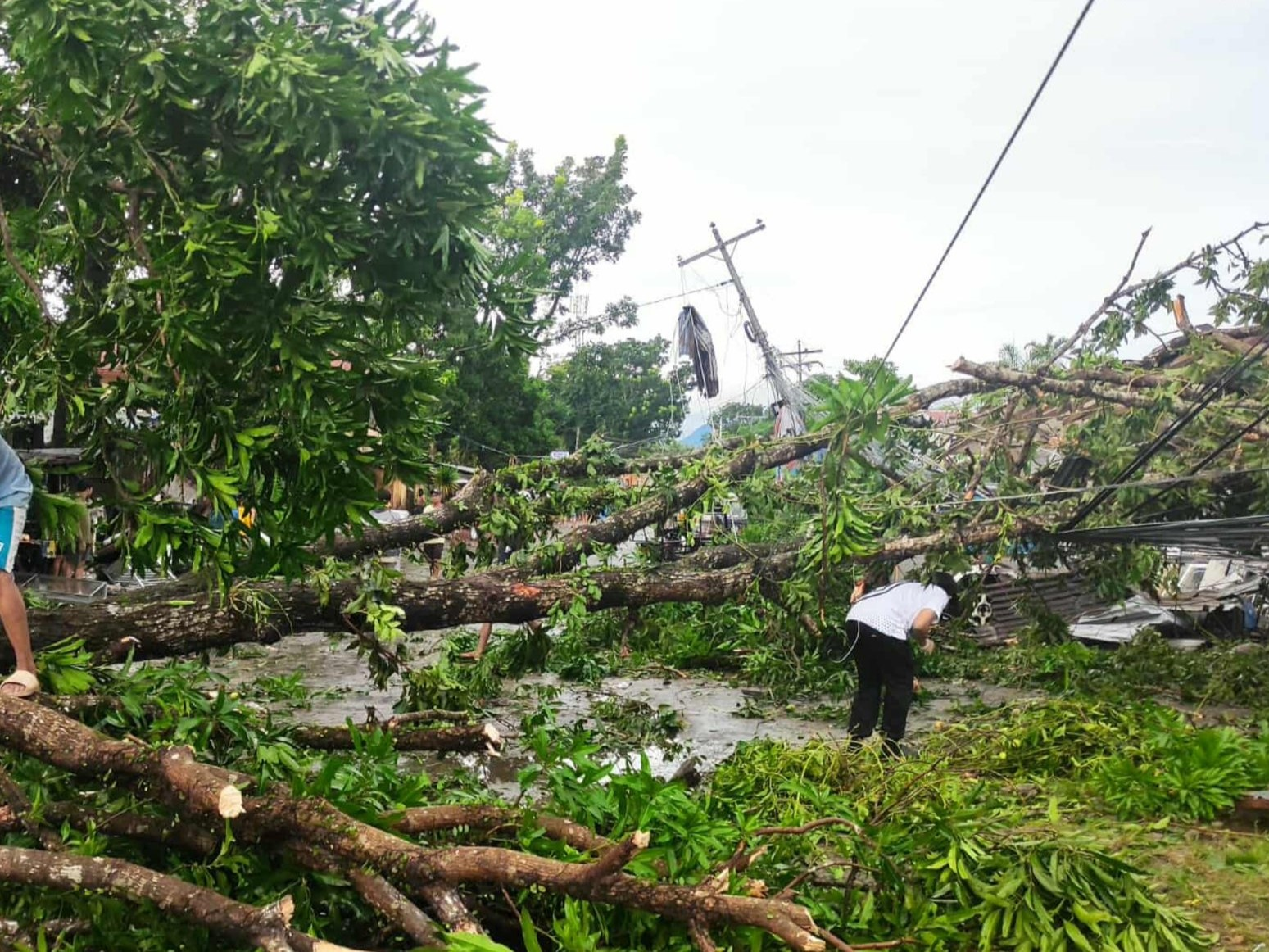
Low-end EF3 tree damage caused by a tornado in Daet, Camarines Norte on September 14, 2025

The Philippines experiences an average of 12 to 24 tornadoes annually, although most of them are relatively weak and short-lived. The country has one of the highest frequencies of reported tornadoes in Asia, alongside China and Japan. They tend to be mild compared to the strong tornadoes in the United States. Most tornadoes range between EF0 and EF1 intensities, with the rarest having EF2 intensities in the Enhanced Fujita scale (EF scale), although some are identified as EFU due to insufficient data. To date, there is only one tornado in the country's recorded history that had received an EF3 rating. Waterspouts are also a general occurrence in the area, but in some instances, these can classify as a tornado once it reaches land. Tornadoes are common during severe thunderstorms influenced by the southwest monsoon and occasionally spawned by typhoons.

== Etymology ==
The word for 'tornado' or 'whirlwind' in most Philippine languages, including Tagalog, is buhawi or ipuipo (sometimes spelled as ipoipo or ipo-ipo) with both referring to a strong, rotating column of wind. In Bisayan, the common term is alimpulos or simply alimpos. The term ipo-ipo mainly refers to 'waterspout'. Although the two terms are often used interchangeably, buhawi refers to land-based tornadoes while ipo-ipo refers to waterspouts.

== Climatology ==
A tornado, also known locally as buhawi or ipo-ipo, (Note: Buhawi is a term for a tornado that formed on land while ipo-ipo is a term for a tornado that formed on water.) is a violently rotating column of air that descends from the base of a thunderstorm onto the ground. They typically form during severe thunderstorms influenced by monsoons or in the right-front quadrant of tropical cyclones, relative to its track. Tornadoes are expected for about half of tropical cyclones with tropical storm intensity in regions where the air has a brief trajectory over land, paired together with a strong convection.

The country is situated near the equator with a tropical climate, characterized by relatively high temperature, high humidity, and abundant rainfall. It is also located west from the Pacific Ocean, which makes the country prone to natural disasters including typhoons. During the wet season, the Intertropical Convergence Zone (ITCZ) shifts north into the country. Warm, moist air rises into the atmosphere and cools, releasing accumulated moisture that results in an increase of severe thunderstorms and aiding the formation of tropical cyclones. The southwest monsoon or habagat also influences severe weather as warm, moist air travel northeast towards the country, causing heavy rainfall.

One of PAGASA's doppler weather radars showing a hook echo in Metro Manila on August 14, 2016

Tornadoes occur regularly in the country, albeit their frequency and intensity are significantly lower than those in the United States. They are influenced by the Intertropical Convergence Zone which makes the country susceptible to tornadoes. There are multiple tornado hotspots in the Philippines, with Central Luzon and the Greater Manila Area having the most recorded tornadic activity. Luzon is surrounded by the Zambales Mountain Range to the west and the Sierra Madre Mountain Range to the east which influences atmospheric instability through orographic effect. Manila Bay also contributes by bringing warm, humid air towards the regions. Another tornado hotspot is located in Central Mindanao, where tornadoes are heavily concentrated in Cotabato due to a similar effect. Wind shears and atmospheric conditions from supercell thunderstorms, monsoons, or typhoons increase the chances for tornadoes to develop. The flash rate density in these areas are significantly higher compared to Visayas which only has two known smaller tornado hotspots, specifically in the western and central regions. It is not yet possible to determine the influence of atmospheric oscillations on the formation of tornadoes due to insufficient data.

Monthly distribution of tornadoes
	January	February	March	April	May	June	July	August	September	October	November	December
No. of tornadoes	30	16	51	42	66	72	79	81	79	57	48	35

The active season for tornadoes in the country begin in March, particularly in Panay, Maguindanao, and South Cotabato. On April, tornadic activity rises in Mindanao, while high concentrations of tornadoes in Luzon emerge in May. The initial peak of the active season occurs in June wherein tornadic events are scattered across the country with the arrival of the southwest monsoon. Documented reports of tornadoes increase from June to August, especially in the country's tornado hotspots. By September, the active season begins to dwindle and shifts south due to the arrival of the northeast monsoon, especially in Luzon and Visayas with the exception of Mindanao in which tornadic activity still remains until November. Eventually, the season dies down in December with only a few documented cases of severe weather events being reported.

Yearly distribution of tornadoes (2009-2025)
	2009	2010	2011	2012	2013	2014	2015	2016	2017	2018	2019	2020	2021	2022	2023	2024	2025
No. of tornadoes	18	3	18	18	20	23	20	17	24	21	26	24	28	45	29	107	141

Some of these tornadoes go unreported due to them being too weak to cause damages, or they touch down on rural areas with little to no population. Reports of tornadoes have increased since 2009 due to the rise of internet access in the country, primarily through social media and news outlets. As of 2026, there are more than 600 documented tornadoes in the country's recorded history.

The most notable and well-documented tornado is the Manila tornado, when on August 14, 2016, a rare multi-vortex EF1 tornado swept through Metro Manila. It damaged more than 100 buildings and injured 2 people. Another notable example is an extremely rare EF2 tornado in Arayat, Pampanga during Typhoon Ewiniar on May 27, 2024. This tornado reached estimated wind speeds of up to 201 km/h (125 mph) as it damaged at least 30 houses and 2 school buildings. There were no reported injuries from the tornado. Moreover, one tornado received an EF3 rating – a first in the country's recorded history – after it struck Daet, Camarines Norte on September 14, 2025. It reached estimated wind speeds of at least 220 km/h (137 mph), which resulted in a total of 121 houses damaged, 2 people killed, and 2 others injured. The earliest-known tornado was recorded in Morong, Rizal on May 17, 1871 where a tornado that originated as a waterspout, destroyed 43 houses and multiple trees. The deadliest tornado was recorded in Manukan, Zamboanga del Norte on June 12, 1990, where an EF2 tornado destroyed a total of 154 houses, killed 51 people, and injured more than 100 others.

== Tornado alerts ==
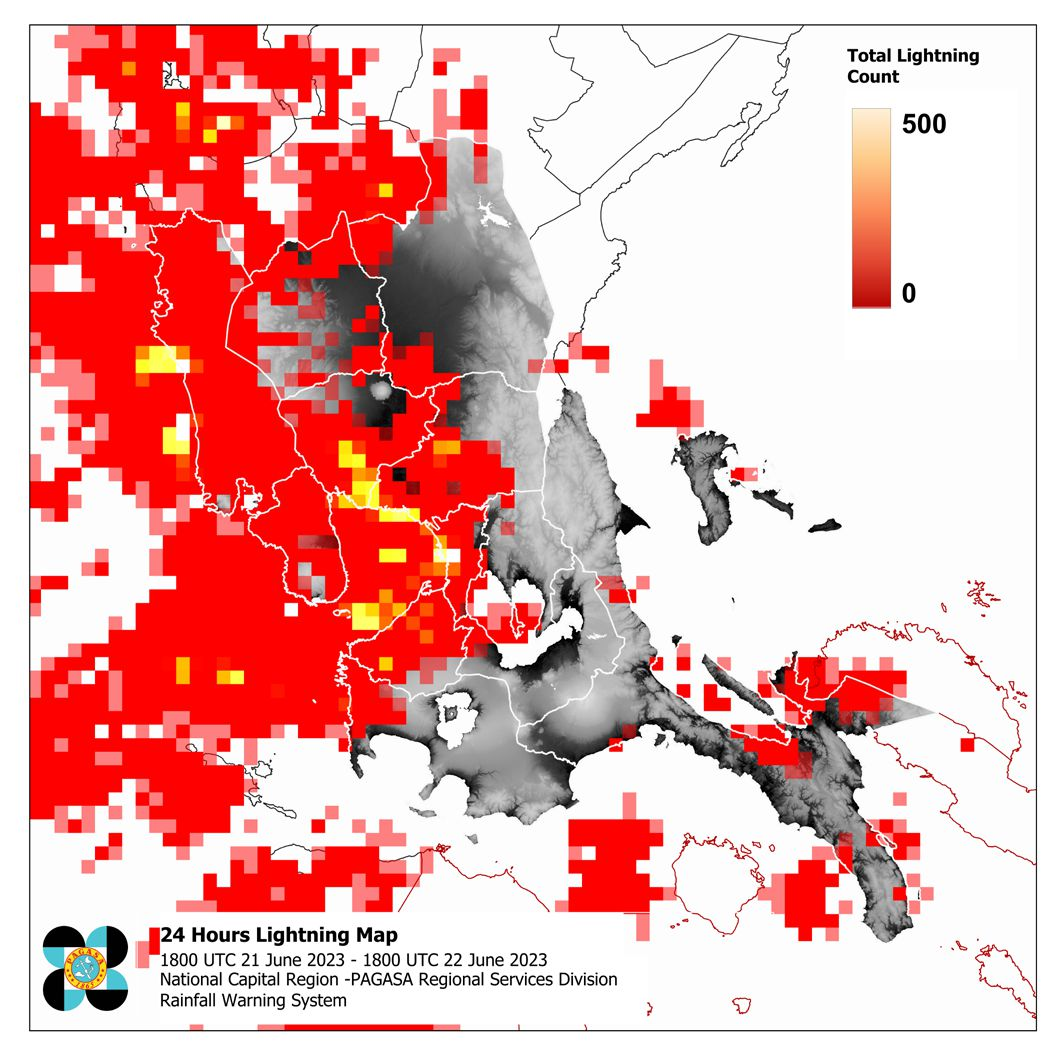
A lightning map detailing the surge of lightning activity in Luzon that coincided with the Bacolor tornado.

The country currently does not have an active tornado alert system in place. The meteorological agency, PAGASA, stated that they do not have the capability to set tornado warnings or tornado bulletins yet. They rely on doppler weather radars and storm chasers on the ground to gather data on tornadoes. Although, they are planning on putting up a tornado warning system. Thunderstorm advisories are often issued by PAGASA for severe thunderstorms.

Since 2018, PAGASA launched their total lightning detection network, consisting of 28 lightning detectors that are stationed across the country in order to acquire real-time data on lightning activity. This allows meteorologists to forecast weather conditions and improve early warning systems and advisories, including thunderstorms and severe weather events such as hailstorms and tornadoes. The network was utilized during the Bacolor tornado on June 22, 2023, wherein a surge of lightning activity was observed on the western side of Luzon, particularly in Pampanga, and prompted a thunderstorm advisory.

== Tornadoes ==
This list includes confirmed and probable tornadoes reported from news articles, government agencies, and research publications. Tornado intensities are rated according to the Severe Weather Archive of the Philippines. Some tornadoes are rated as F/EFU due to lack of available data on damage assessments. Tornadoes with no ratings have not been assessed yet.

=== Pre-2000 ===
==== 1870s ====
- May 17, 1871 – A tornado that originated as a waterspout from Laguna de Bay struck Morong, Rizal during a thundershower at 18:45 PhST. It had wind speeds of 116 km/h (72 mph) and destroyed all houses in its path. Its erratic movement resulted in the destruction of 43 houses, and multiple fruit trees and bamboo palms in the area.

==== 1880s ====
- August 19, 1881 - A tornado that is associated with a typhoon, struck Polo, Bulacan where nearly all house made from lightweight materials were destroyed. Two stone houses was severely damaged and one house was reportedly swept away. Two people and a bullock were carried away, although no casualties were reported.

==== 1900s ====
- May 16, 1903 – A tornado accompanied by hail struck Santa Maria, Bulacan at around 17:00 PhST. It overturned houses, mostly made of bamboo and nipa, scattered trees, and collapsed the Presidencia.

==== 1910s ====
- August 7, 1919 – A powerful tornado struck Iloilo City just before midnight where it damaged more than 50 houses and destroyed a convent. Its path covered the area between Calle Iznart and Plaza Libertad. Posts were carried more than 300 m (984 ft) away and houses were carried at a short distance. An 18-year-old student was killed by the tornado while 7 others were injured.

==== 1920s ====
- June 13, 1926 – A tornado swept through Intramuros, Manila at around 04:55 PhST. It originated near the Pasig River and crossed south of Fort Santiago, which then travelled between Ayuntamiento de Manila and the University of Santo Tomas. It blew galvanized iron sheets off a patio from the Hotel de Oriente, with one of the plates struck the electrical wires of Meralco which resulted in power flashes. The tornado also struck the roof of La Palma de Mallorca where it tore off several galvanized iron sheets, one of which became imbedded into a stone wall due to the force of the wind. A heavy door was forcibly separated from the framework of a building in Calle Real and was thrown several meters away.
- April 14, 1927 – A tornado accompanied by hail swept through Tuguegarao between 19:40 PhST and 19:45 PhST. The storm originated east of Tuguegarao Cathedral and traveled west-northwest towards two barrios, before it dissipated near Solana. It reached wind force 8 to 9 on the Beaufort scale, which it destroyed several strong houses, collapsed a school building, and uprooted nearby trees.
- April 22, 1928 – A tornado that originated near the Cagayan River struck Tuguegarao where it destroyed five houses, damaged banana plantations, and uprooted several trees. It reached wind force 5 to 8 on the Beaufort scale, and was accompanied with hail and rain.
- October 27, 1928 – A tornado struck Guianga district in Davao City where it affected around 6,000 hectares of hemp plantations, which amounted to more than ₱2 million in damages.

==== 1930s ====
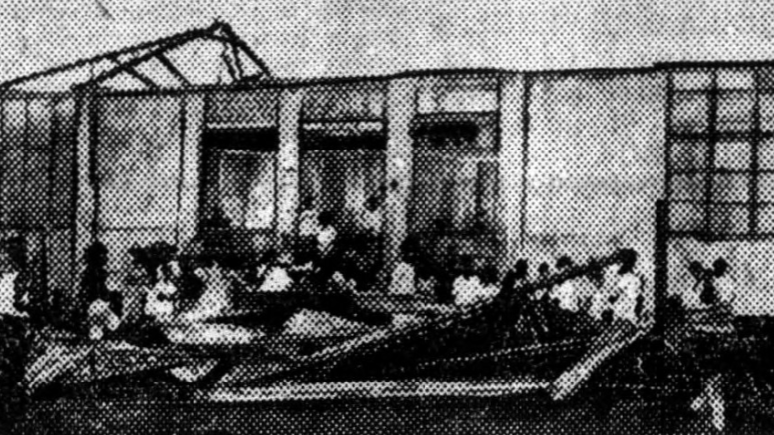
A school nearly destroyed by a tornado in Makati on June 23, 1930

- June 23, 1930 – A destructive tornado struck Makati during a torrential rain at around 14:30 PhST. It demolished houses, uprooted trees, toppled telegraph and telephone posts, and almost completely destroyed a school as it ripped apart galvanized iron sheets, with some blown away for more than half a kilometer. Twenty were injured from the tornado, most of whom were children. Among those injured, fourteen required medical assistance and were sent to nearby hospitals.
- November 3, 1930 – A tornado spawned by a typhoon struck multiple towns in Iloilo at around 03:00 PhST. It completely destroyed over 150 houses, toppled several trees, and scattered debris on the streets. The belfry of a local church in Pototan was also destroyed.
- August 9, 1932 – A tornado injured several people and destroyed properties in Tamparan, Lanao del Sur. A woman was killed after being buried in the ruins of her house.
- August 12, 1933 – A tornado struck Hagonoy, Bulacan during a heavy thunderstorm at around 15:40 PhST. It unroofed buildings, blew away corrugated iron sheets, and uprooted banana palms. In total, the tornado destroyed 40 nipa houses and damaged a hundred small houses in multiple barrios of the town. However, houses made of strong materials suffered no damage.
- July 29, 1939 – A tornado struck Vigan, Ilocos Sur where it wrecked multiple buildings, including the Vigan Trade School (now University of Northern Philippines). Four students from the school were critically injured after the building collapsed.

==== 1940s ====
- September 13, 1944 – A tornado struck Bulalacao, Oriental Mindoro where it destroyed eight houses, including a church, and damaged several others.
- July 4, 1949 – A tornado struck the University of the Philippines Diliman in Quezon City where it destroyed five buildings, four of which were dormitories, and damaged 27 others. No injuries were reported.
- June 27, 1949 – Two waterspouts swept through Bantayan Island where it destroyed several small houses with one house getting carried for nearly 60 meters, a fishing launch was lifted, and heavy property damages were reported. It also killed a girl and injured nine people.

==== 1950s ====
- June 12, 1952 – A tornado struck Pura, Tarlac where it wrecked nine houses and uprooted large trees. No casualties were reported.
- September 13, 1954 – A tornado struck Cagayan de Oro where it flattened eight houses, uprooted trees, and collapsed walls. It injured 8 people as it swept through the city.

==== 1960s ====
- June 13, 1968 – The Macabebe–Masantol tornado was an EF1 tornado that struck the towns of Macabebe and Masantol in the province of Pampanga. It formed shortly before midnight and destroyed 40 houses, killed 12 people, and injured 42 others. Among the fatalities, a total of 8 people died in Macabebe while 4 people died in Masantol.

==== 1970s ====
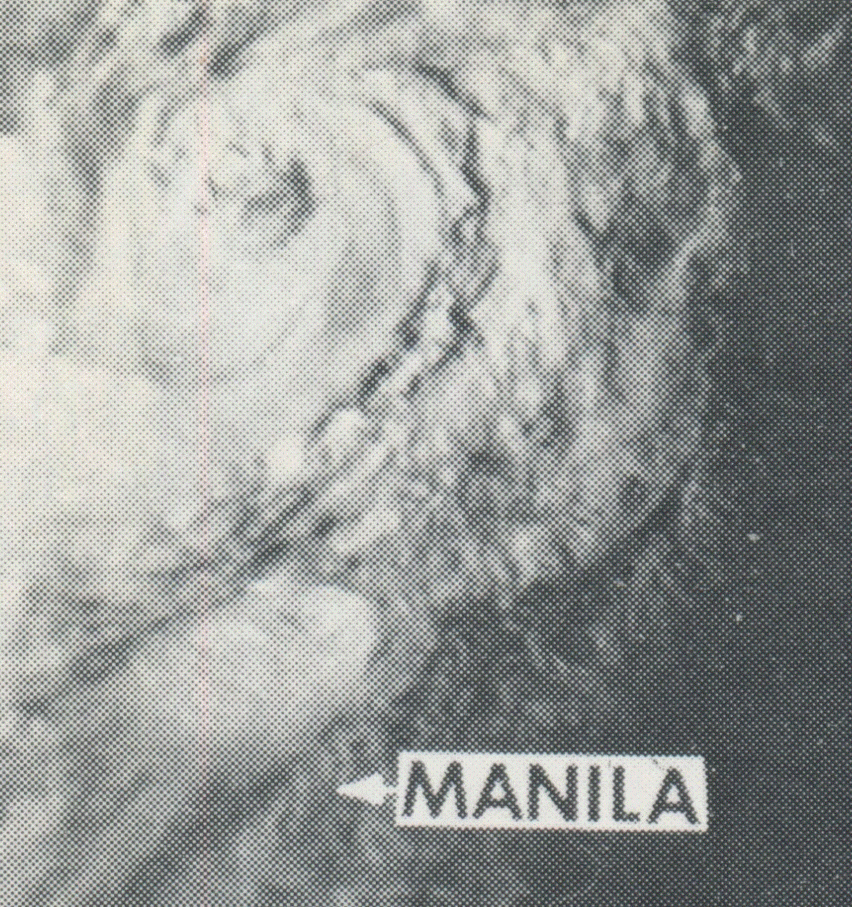
A satellite view of Typhoon Ruby on June 27, 1976 which spawned a tornado in Arayat, Pampanga.

- June 27, 1976 – The 1976 Arayat tornado was a tornado that was spawned by Typhoon Ruby (Huaning) and struck Arayat, Pampanga. It destroyed 26 houses, unroofed a church, and uprooted trees and utility poles. The tornado also killed 2 people and injured 6 others.

==== 1980s ====
- January 20, 1985 – A tornado that originated as a waterspout struck eight villages in Tanjay and Pamplona, Negros Oriental where it triggered flash floods and a landslide that left 60 families homeless and killed 48 people.
- July 5, 1981 – A tornado spawned by Severe Tropical Storm Lynn (Elang) struck the island of Mindoro where it destroyed houses and banana plantations, and damaged multiple fruit trees. It displaced more than 800 families. The area was previously hit by Typhoon Kelly (Oniang) which already caused further damages.
- September 3, 1985 – An EF1 tornado spawned by Typhoon Tess struck Lemery, Batangas. It destroyed 56 houses and left 336 people homeless. It killed a 5-year old boy and injured 5 other people.
- June 5, 1987 – A tornado struck two villages in Manila where it toppled 30 houses, uprooted trees, and injured 22 people.
- August 6, 1987 – A tornado accompanied by a hailstorm struck Parañaque where it scattered branches and uprooted trees.
- April 24, 1988 – A tornado struck three villages in Mexico, Pampanga during a heavy downpour between 16:00 PhST and 17:00 PhST. Fifteen families were left homeless after the tornado destroyed nine houses, mostly made from light materials, and uprooted several big trees in the area.
- October 23, 1988 – A tornado spawned by Typhoon Ruby (Unsang) struck six villages near Cagayan de Oro where it destroyed 1000 thatch houses, including a bridge, and left at least 26,000 people homeless. A total of 10 people were killed by the tornado, including a 6-year-old child. On the aftermath, the Philippine National Red Cross provided immediate assistance to tornado victims. US Ambassador Nicholas Platt also donated $25,000 to the Philippine National Red Cross for relief assistance.
- November 7, 1988 – A tornado spawned by Typhoon Skip (Yoning) struck Camarines Sur where it killed at least two children.
- June 1, 1989 – A tornado caused slight damage on the Philippine General Hospital that was being constructed in Manila.
- June 3, 1989 – An EF1 tornado that was accompanied by flash floods struck Malita, Davao Occidental where it destroyed 150 houses, including two bridges, and left 600 people homeless. A total of 13 people were killed, four of them were children, including a 9-month old baby after being hit by a falling tree, and four people were injured.
- July 31, 1989 – A tornado hit certain parts of Metro Manila at around 03:00 PhST. It destroyed several houses and uprooted trees which amounted to ₱1 million. A total of 9 people were injured from the tornado. Five people were killed in Malabon after the tornado collapsed a concrete wall. In Caloocan, three houses were damaged as the tornado blew away roofs. In Quezon City, a concrete wall from a memorial garden collapsed. Debris were scattered next to the North Luzon Expressway. The tornado caused power outages in the area after it toppled electrical posts. After the incident, the Philippine National Red Cross and the Department of Social Welfare and Development began relief operations for tornado victims.
- September 10, 1989 – A tornado spawned by Typhoon Sarah (Openg) struck the San Miguel Naval Communications Station in San Antonio, Zambales where it uprooted trees, toppled power lines, and damaged buildings worth estimated $150,000. It also injured 2 people after a tree struck their car.

==== 1990s ====
- June 12, 1990 – The Manukan tornado was an EF2 tornado that struck the town of Manukan in the province of Zamboanga del Norte at around 19:00 PhST. It leveled a total of 154 houses, mostly made from coconut leaves, and carried people, plants, and animals into the sea. Hundreds of people were left homeless, more than 100 people were injured, and a total of 51 people were killed. A state of public calamity was declared in the province due to heavy destruction on agricultural crops, infrastructures, and properties that amounted to around ₱40 million.
- November 13, 1990 – A tornado spawned by Typhoon Mike (Ruping) struck three villages in Cagayan de Oro where it destroyed 160 houses.
- July 2, 1991 – A tornado with estimated EF2 intensity struck eleven villages in Lantapan, Bukidnon where it destroyed infrastructures and agricultural crops. This incident had initial estimated costs of up to ₱2.37 million and ₱5.9 million in damages respectively, which led to declaring a state of public calamity.
- August 12, 1991 – A tornado struck Lubang, Occidental Mindoro where it destroyed 10 houses, damaged 20 others, and killed a person.
- August 16, 1991 – A tornado struck four villages Cabanglasan, Bukidnon where it flattened houses and uprooted trees which amounted to at least $37,000 (approximately ₱1 million) worth of damages to property. It killed 6 people and left 15 others missing.
- June 30, 1994 – An EFU tornado struck four fishing villages near Cagayan de Oro. It picked up water as it crossed nearby rivers and dumped as much as two meters on the villages where it swept several houses away. More than 3,800 people were evacuated, 8 people were killed, and 3 others were rendered missing. Among those killed, some were found more than 70 km (43.5 mi) away from where the tornado struck.
- October 8, 1994 – A strong tornado struck a village in San Fernando, Pampanga at around 15:30 PhST where it destroyed 40 houses, uprooted trees and electrical posts. It injured 29 people, including children, and were brought to a nearby hospital for treatments.
- October 13, 1994 – A tornado struck the Clark Field evacuation center filled with around 13,000 people that were displaced by lahar flows in Porac. It destroyed bunkhouses in the area, killed three people, and injured several others. Two of the fatalities were from flying debris while the other was blown away from a tricycle and hit his head against an electrical post.
- October 16, 1994 – Two separate tornadoes struck San Fernando, Pampanga and Cagayan de Oro. The first swept through to a village in San Fernando, while the second devastated a slum colony in Cagayan de Oro. In total, 72 houses were flattened and dozens of people were injured.
- November 26, 1994 – An EF1 tornado struck eight villages in Datu Piang, Maguindanao del Sur during a heavy downpour where it destroyed at least 160 houses and a school. The tornado left at least 14 people missing and feared dead.
- September 29, 1995 – A tornado caused a landslide in Valencia, Bukidnon and buried multiple houses. A total of 67 houses were destroyed and 18 people were killed, seven of whom were children, while seven people were injured. Some survivors were found in the rubble and were brought to nearby hospitals.
- June 25, 1997 – A tornado struck San Pablo, Zamboanga del Sur and destroyed over a million pesos in agricultural crops and properties.
- August 6, 1997 – A tornado struck a school in Malaybalay, Bukidnon where it ripped off the roof of a school and injuring ten people.
- May 9, 1998 – A tornado destroyed a wooden ferry in Lake Lanao, Lanao Del Sur leading to 17 fatalities including four children, while ten people are rendered missing.
- August 10, 1998 – An EF2 tornado struck Bulakan, Bulacan.
- August 17, 1998 – An EF1 tornado struck Kalibo, Aklan and injured 4 people.
- May 3, 1999 – An EF1 tornado struck M'lang, Cotabato.
- June 7, 1999 – An EF1 tornado struck M'lang, Cotabato.
- August 22, 1999 – An EF1 tornado struck San Isidro, Bohol.
- September 20, 1999 – An EFU tornado struck Santo Niño, South Cotabato where it damaged 60 houses, toppled power and telecommunication lines, and injured ten people. It caused ₱2 million worth of agricultural crops and infrastructures.

=== 2000s ===
==== 2000 ====
- January 27, 2000 – A tornado struck a village in Calinog, Iloilo at around 13:30 PhST, collapsing a wall of a newly built church and seriously injuring 23 people.
- March 9, 2000 – An EF1 tornado accompanied by floods and a hailstorm struck four villages in Malapatan, Sarangani at around 14:00 PhST. It destroyed multiple houses and hectares of agricultural crops, and uprooted several trees. A person was swept away by the wind and sustained injuries. The municipal government then declared a state of calamity in the area.
- March 18, 2000 – A strong tornado struck four villages in Cotabato City around 15:03 PhST where it destroyed 10 houses, and damaged 200 others, affecting 190 families.
- April 15, 2000 – A tornado struck a village in San Jorge, Samar at 14:30 PhST where it wipe all structures, including an elementary school building. It also toppled 150 trees, and injured two people while 44 families were left homeless.
- May 6, 2000 – A tornado struck a village in Hagonoy, Bulacan during a heavy downpour at around 14:30 PhST. At least 17 houses were damaged, some of them were made of concrete, as it swept the village for 30 seconds and several people were injured from flying debris. A 9-year-old boy drowned after being blown away into a nearby river.
- July 5, 2000 – A tornado struck a village in Bangar, La Union. Destroying six houses and displacing 35 families.
- July 6, 2000 – A tornado struck two villages in San Fernando, Pampanga knocking down trees, and electrical posts, ripping walls and rooftops from several houses, and several people were injured.
- July 19, 2000 – A strong tornado with winds of about 174 mph (280 km/h) and a width of about 33 feet (10 meters) struck a coastal village in Naval, Biliran at around 2:00 PhST, almost leveling the coastal village of Sto. Niño. The tornado seriously injured 25 people, rendered 418 people homeless, and damaged at least 92 houses, causing P15 million in losses. It also severely damaged the Biliran Provincial Hospital and its main, women's, and health buildings which resulted in P3 million in structural damage and injuring four patients from broken glass. It also knocked down power and telephone lines, and destroyed a portion of the Naval Provincial Hospital's press room.

==== 2001 ====
- February 18, 2001 – A tornado spawned by Tropical Depression Auring struck Tacloban. No casualties or damages were reported.
- February 26, 2001 – A tornado struck a village in Braulio E. Dujali, Davao del Norte where it damaged 10 houses and leaving 59 people homeless. No casualties were reported.
- August 11, 2001 – A tornado struck Tibiao, Antique where 54 people were evacuated after it damaged 10 houses.
- September 4, 2001 – A tornado struck five villages in Pikit, Cotabato where at least 88 houses were damaged, farm crops were destroyed, and affected 100 families. It lasted for 10 minutes.
- November 6, 2001 – A powerful tornado accompanied by flash floods that was spawned by Typhoon Lingling (Nanang) struck the municipality of Mahinog in Camiguin where it swept away hundreds of homes and resulted in more than 200 fatalities.

==== 2002 ====
- March 10, 2002 – A tornado struck a village in Carmen, Cotabato where it destroyed two houses and uprooted trees.
- July 7, 2002 – A tornado struck a village in Botolan, Zambales where it damaged houses, toppled trees and electrical posts, and injured a person.
- August 12, 2002 – A tornado spawned by Tropical Depression Milenyo struck Negros Oriental.

==== 2003 ====
Tornadoes spawned by Tropical Storm Linfa on May 27–30, 2003
Tornadoes were spawned by Tropical Storm Linfa (Chedeng) in several areas of Luzon and Visayas. On May 27 at around 23:00 PhST, a tornado tore through Leganes, IloIlo where it destroyed 20 houses, blew away roofs and stripped away the leaves of nearby trees. Another tornado hit Nabas, Aklan where it toppled 20 electrical posts. Both tornadoes left almost a hundred people homeless and caused power outages in the area. In Araceli, Palawan, a waterspout destroyed a boat with five occupants. All five people were rescued and no injuries were reported. On May 30, a tornado struck a village in Malolos, Bulacan where it destroyed two houses.
F#	Area	Province	Casualties
– (Note: Rating to be determined.)	Leganes	Iloilo	None
–	Nabas	Aklan	None
–	Araceli	Palawan	None
–	Malolos	Bulacan	None

- July 17, 2003 – A tornado spawned by Tropical Storm Koni (Gilas) struck a village in Bobon, Northern Samar where six acacia trees were uprooted while one house was damaged.
- July 22, 2003 – A tornado struck a village in Bacolod around 17:30 PhST, where it damaged two houses and injured two people.
- June 9, 2003 – A tornado struck a village in M'lang, Cotabato at around 14:00 PhST. At least 21 houses were damaged, leaving around 150 people homeless, and some farms were destroyed.
- June 14, 2003 – A tornado spawned by Typhoon Soudelor (Egay) struck a village in Castilla, Sorsogon where it destroyed around 20 houses.
- December 19, 2003 – The San Ricardo tornado was an EF2 tornado that struck a village in San Ricardo, Southern Leyte where it swept away at least 60 houses and killed 50 people.

==== 2004 ====
- May 18, 2004 – An EFU tornado spawned by Typhoon Nida (Dindo) struck seven villages in Guimba, Nueva Ecija at around 14:30 PhST where it destroyed 80 houses. It also destroyed up to ₱10 million in agricultural crops and properties.
- June 9, 2004 – A tornado spawned by Tropical Storm Chanthu (Gener) struck Dulag, Leyte on Wednesday morning, lasting for 35 minutes. It flattened houses, uprooted coconut trees, and destroyed around 900 houses, killing an elderly man, injuring four people, and leaving 12 people missing. On the nearby island of Samar, the tornado also killed a fisherman and left six others missing after it overturned two fishing boats. A total of 30 fishing boats were reported missing.
- July 17, 2004 – An EFU tornado struck a village in Cawayan, Masbate at around 01:30 PhST and injured 2 people. It destroyed houses and wrecked two boats which amounted to ₱200,000.
- July 21, 2004 – A tornado struck six villages in Masantol, Pampanga where it destroyed 12 houses and affected up to 102 people.
- July 31, 2004 – An EFU tornado struck Talisay, Cebu at around 21:00 PhST. It destroyed at least 20 houses, uprooted trees, and toppled power lines. It went through several villages with wind speeds of 32 to 64 km/h (20 to 40 mph). A power outage occurred after an electrical transformer suddenly burst and phone lines in some areas were disrupted.
- August 4, 2004 – A tornado struck a village in Valladolid, Negros Occidental where it uprooted a nipa hut.
- August 6, 2004 – A tornado struck a village in Valladolid, Negros Occidental where it destroyed a house and damaged two others.
- August 8, 2004 – A tornado struck two villages in Valladolid, Negros Occidental at around 15:00 PhST where it destroyed nine houses and damaged 34 others. An 8-year-old boy was injured after being hit by a live wire which resulted in minor burns.
- August 14, 2004 – A tornado struck Hinoba-An, Negros Occidental at around 17:00 PhST where it destroyed eight houses, damaging two others, uprooted trees, and destroyed crops. A state of calamity was declared.
- August 15, 2004 – An EF1 tornado struck Valladolid, Negros Occidental where it destroyed 85 houses.
- August 25, 2004 – A tornado struck Quezon City where it unroofed approximately 20 houses and left several people injured.
- November 20, 2004 – A strong tornado spawned by Typhoon Muifa (Unding) struck Roxas, Oriental Mindoro where it damaged several homes, uprooted trees, and toppled power lines which resulted in power outages in the area. Around 12 people were reportedly killed by the tornado.

==== 2005 ====
- April 15, 2005 – A tornado struck eight villages in Rajah Buayan, Maguindanao del Sur that led to the evacuation of around 305 people. One of the hardest hit villages was Panadtaban, wherein the tornado destroyed 53 houses and two school buildings.
- May 20, 2005 – An EFU tornado struck Binmaley, Pangasinan where it destroyed at least 23 houses.
- July 4, 2005 – A tornado struck the University of the Philippines Diliman in Quezon City at around 16:45 PhST. It lasted for 10 minutes as it uprooted structures and vehicles in its path where it resulted in damages of up to ₱50,000. Some people sustained minor injuries as they stumbled while running away to safety.
- July 24, 2005 – A tornado swept through an island village of Bongo in Parang, Maguindanao del Norte where at least 50 houses were destroyed, displaced 300 people and injured several people.
- November 24, 2005 – A tornado struck Kabacan, North Cotabato where it destroyed seven houses and killed a person after being hit by flying debris.
- November 29, 2005 – A powerful tornado struck Kabuntalan and Talitay, Maguindanao where it destroyed 22 houses and killed three people, including a minor.

==== 2006 ====
- March 16, 2006 – A tornado struck six villages in Panay, Capiz where it destroyed at least 10 houses.
- March 18, 2006 – An EFU tornado struck a village in Tupi, South Cotabato, where it uprooted 19 houses, caused over ₱10 million in damage across 50 hectares of farmland, and toppled five electrical posts, resulting in a power outage.
- April 15, 2006 – A tornado struck Cotabato City where it toppled two acacia trees and blew away debris.
- May 6, 2006 – An EFU tornado struck a village in Tampakan, South Cotabato at around 19:00 PhST. It destroyed around 25,000 hectares of banana trees and other crops which amounted to ₱4 million.

Tornadoes spawned by Typhoon Chanchu on May 10–13, 2006
Three tornadoes were spawned by Typhoon Chanchu (Caloy). On May 10, an EF1 tornado struck Sasmuan, Pampanga at around 20:45 PhST. It destroyed at least 70 houses, injured a 7-year-old boy after getting hit by a flying metal sheet, and caused the death of a woman after she suffered from a heart attack. It then swept through the nearby town of Guagua at around 21:00 PhST where it destroyed four houses and damaged eight others. A tricycle was blown away by the tornado and landed in a nearby cemetery. Two days later, a tornado struck three villages in President Roxas, Capiz where it destroyed 54 houses and injured a person. On May 13, an EF1 tornado struck seven villages in Saint Bernard, Southern Leyte where at least 20 houses were destroyed and 12 others sustained partial damages.
F#	Area	Province	Casualties
EF1	Sasmuan & Guagua	Pampanga	1 fatality, 1 injured
–	President Roxas	Capiz	1 injured
EF1	Saint Bernard	Southern Leyte	None

- August 8, 2006 – An EFU tornado struck a village in Parang, Maguindanao del Norte where it destroyed 36 houses.
- August 9, 2006 – An EFU tornado accompanied by a landslide struck Sarangani, Davao Occidental where it killed 7 people and destroyed 1,200 houses. A state of calamity was declared in the area after the incident.
- August 18, 2006 – A tornado struck a village in Santa Cruz, Zambales at around 22:00 PhST where it damaged several houses and toppled trees. A house and a piggery were completely destroyed.
- September 27, 2006 – A tornado spawned by Typhoon Xangsane (Milenyo) struck Zamboanga City. A one-year-old infant was carried away and sustained injuries. Four other people were injured as the tornado blew away the roof a house.

==== 2007 ====
- July 30, 2007 – Three EF1 tornadoes struck towns in the provinces of Bulacan and Pampanga. In Bulacan, an EF1 tornado struck the town of Bustos where it damaged 31 houses while another EF1 tornado struck the town of Baliwag where it damaged 27 houses. Initial assessments estimated damages to reach more than ₱3 million in Baliwag. In Pampanga, an EF1 tornado struck three villages in the town of Candaba where it destroyed 2 houses, damaged 10 others, and left 12 families homeless. It injured two people, one of whom is a child.
- August 7, 2007 – An EF1 tornado struck San Rafael, Bulacan where it destroyed 27 houses, most were made from light materials. A person was lifted and carried into a rice field 8 m (26 ft) away from his house.
- August 22, 2007 – An EF1 tornado struck San Miguel, Bulacan where at least 30 houses were damaged.
- September 5, 2007 – A tornado struck Isabela, Negros Occidental where it hit houses and a school.
- September 17, 2007 – A tornado spawned by Typhoon Wipha (Goring) struck Bacolod, Negros Occidental at around 15:00 PhST. It damaged 23 houses, four of which were leveled.
- September 26, 2007 – A tornado struck six villages in Santo Tomas, Davao del Norte where to destroyed more than ₱2 million worth of properties.

==== 2008 ====
- January 12, 2008 – An EFU tornado struck Bongabong, Oriental Mindoro at around 19:30 PhST. It knocked down trees and electrical lines, and damaged at least 65 houses.
- March 16, 2008 – An EFU tornado struck four villages in Tupi, South Cotabato at 15:00 PhST. It destroyed 2 houses and partially damaged 69 others. It displaced 71 families and injured 2 people as it moved through the area. Agricultural crops were uprooted, and electrical and telephone posts were also toppled which resulted in a power outage that lasted for several hours. The tornado caused initial estimated damages of more than ₱2 million.
- June 21, 2008 – A tornado spawned by Typhoon Fengshen (Frank) struck a village in Sagay, Negros Occidental where it destroyed 16 houses and killed a person.
- August 4, 2008 – A tornado overturned a school bus that was heading north in Palauig, Zambales where it killed a 15-year-old student and injured 14 others.
- August 14, 2008 – An EFU tornado struck Los Bańos, Laguna where it ripped off roofs and uprooted trees. It also damaged some houses near the main intersection of the town.
- September 5, 2008 – An EFU tornado snapped power cables in San Carlos, Pangasinan.

==== 2009 ====
- March 12, 2009 – An EFU tornado struck four villages in Tupi, South Cotabato where it damaged approximately 20 hectares of agricultural crops and 12 houses, three of said houses were totally destroyed, combined having estimated costs of ₱5 million in damages.
- May 11, 2009 – A tornado struck a village in Koronadal, South Cotabato where it destroyed houses and agricultural crops, and uprooted several trees. It formed at around 16:00 PhST and lasted for 10 minutes.
- May 18, 2009 – An EFU tornado struck a village in Kabuntalan, Maguindanao del Norte where it destroyed more than 20 houses and displaced more than a hundred people.
- June 4, 2009 – An EF1 tornado demolished 12 shanties at the University of the Philippines Diliman in Quezon City.
- June 14, 2009 – An EF1 tornado affected two villages in Sariaya, Quezon and damaged 7 houses and a school.
- June 23, 2009 – Two EF1 tornadoes were spawned by Tropical Storm Nangka (Feria). In Perez, Quezon, a boat with 15 passengers was struck by an EF1 tornado at around 01:00 PhST where it killed 4 people and injured 2 others. Another EF1 tornado hit four villages in Can-avid, Eastern Samar where it damaged 26 houses.
- August 10, 2009 – An EF1 tornado struck near an elementary school in Oton, Iloilo where it injured 20 pupils.
- August 15, 2009 – An EF1 tornado struck San Luis, Pampanga and killed a 7-month-old baby after her hammock that was attached to the roof was blown away. It was lifted as high as 9 m (30 ft) before it fell 10 m (32.8 ft) away from her house.
- August 16, 2009 – An EF1 tornado struck four towns in Bulacan at around 14:30 PhST. In Balagtas, three people were injured and around ₱100,000 in damages were caused by the tornado. Meanwhile in Guiguinto, an estimated ₱1.2 million in damages were reported.
- September 10, 2009 – An EF1 tornado struck Koronadal, South Cotabato where it damaged 21 houses and injured 2 people, including a 7-year-old boy. It lasted for 10 minutes as it blew away roofs of houses.

Confirmed tornadoes in South Cotabato on September 30, 2009
The South Cotabato regional tornado outbreak was a series of multiple EF1 tornadoes that struck the province. These tornadoes uprooted more than a hundred houses and damaged agricultural crops worth at least ₱10 million. A 15-year-old boy was injured in Koronadal after a tornado toppled a tree and hit him. The province was also previously hit by more than a dozen tornadoes since January.
EF#	Area	Casualties
EF1	Tupi	None
EF1	Surallah	None
EF1	Banga	None
EF1	Santo Niño	None
EF1	Tantangan	None
EF1	Koronadal	1 injured

- October 13, 2009 – An EFU tornado struck Senator Ninoy Aquino, Sultan Kudarat where it destroyed at least 4 houses.
- October 31, 2009 – A tornado spawned by Typhoon Mirinae (Santi) struck four villages in Ternate, Cavite at 06:30 PhST. It destroyed around 60 houses, and toppled electrical and telephone poles in the area. The tornado injured 10 people and led to the evacuation of at least 30 families.

=== 2010s ===
==== 2010 ====
- June 10, 2010 – An EFU tornado was reported in Bustos, Bulacan.
- August 10, 2010 – A tornado struck Valencia, Bukidnon at around 16:00 PhST. It damaged a total of 84 houses, 16 of which were destroyed, and toppled five electrical posts which caused a power outage. Two people were injured as the tornado moved through a village.
- August 17, 2010 – A tornado struck Bantayan, Cebu where it damaged 22 houses and injured an 8-year-old child after he was hit by a flying galvanized iron sheet.
- August 18, 2010 – Two tornadoes struck the southern portion of Cebu province. The town of Santander was hit by a tornado where it damaged around 20 houses while another tornado hit the town of Argao where it damaged 14 houses. A person was injured in Argao after getting hit by a hard object after her house collapsed.
- August 19, 2010 – A tornado struck a village in Banga, South Cotabato at around 17:00 PhST where it destroyed 14 houses.

==== 2011 ====
- January 28, 2011 – An EF1 tornado struck Surigao City where it damaged at least three houses and collapsed a bridge.
- February 3, 2011 – A tornado struck Jolo, Sulu where it killed 5 people, including a one-year-old infant, and injured 20 others.
- February 5, 2011 – An EFU tornado destroyed 36 hectares of agricultural crops in Banga, South Cotabato.
- February 22, 2011 – An EF1 tornado struck two villages in Glan, Sarangani where it destroyed at least 182 houses, agricultural crops, and power lines. The town then declared a state of calamity due to the impact of the tornado, which was considered to be the worst in the last three decades.
- March 17, 2011 – An EFU tornado struck Banga, South Cotabato where it destroyed 2 houses and partially damaged 3 others. Meanwhile, another EF1 tornado struck two villages in Kolambugan, Lanao del Norte at around 20:00 PhST where it damaged around 60 houses, 6 of which were destroyed, and injured a 12-year-old girl.
- March 24, 2011 – An EFU tornado accompanied by flash floods struck Maimbung, Sulu where it affected a total of 113 families.
- March 31, 2011 – A tornado struck a village in Nabunturan, Davao de Oro at around 20:30 PhST where at least two people were killed, two others were injured, and three were rendered missing. It also collapsed a bridge from the village and another in the nearby town of Maco.
- May 7, 2011 – An EFU tornado spawned by Tropical Storm Aere (Bebeng) struck Calumpit, Bulacan at around 18:00 PhST where it destroyed at least 4 houses and damaged 37 others. Local authorities investigated whether a person that was killed by a heart were presumably caused by the tornado.
- May 20, 2011 – An EFU tornado struck Santo Tomas, Davao del Norte where it damaged 22 houses and injured 2 kids.
- May 24, 2011 – An EF1 tornado struck Cabiao, Nueva Ecija where it damaged several houses and injured a person after they were hit by falling debris.

Tornadoes spawned by Tropical Storm Meari on June 24–25, 2011
Three tornadoes were spawned by Tropical Storm Meari (Falcon). On June 24, an EF1 tornado struck areas in Quezon City, including New Manila at around 12:00 PhST where it ripped off the roofs of 40 houses, toppled trees, and injured a person. It also collapsed a concrete wall onto four vehicles, it lasted for about two minutes. At around 13:30 PhST, a separate EFU tornado hit Barotac Nuevo, Iloilo where it destroyed 24 houses and damaged 25 others. On June 25, an EF1 tornado hit two villages in Meycauayan, Bulacan where it damaged a total of 37 houses.
EF#	Area	Province	Casualties
EF1	Quezon City	Metro Manila	1 injured
EFU	Barotac Nuevo	Iloilo	None
EF1	Meycauayan	Bulacan	None

- July 29, 2011 – An EF1 tornado struck two villages in Cagayan de Oro at around 16:00 PhST where it damaged 70 houses and injured 20 people, with one of them injured from a steel roofing panel.
- August 26, 2011 – a tornado struck a village in Biliran, Biliran where it blew away the roofs of three school buildings.
- September 3, 2011 – An EF1 tornado struck three villages in Valencia, Bukidnon where it destroyed 37 houses and damaged two others. A total of 40 families were affected, a one-year-old boy was killed, and four others were injured.
- September 11, 2011 – An EFU tornado struck a village in Umingan, Pangasinan where it destroyed at least 20 houses and several hectares of rice fields. It also uprooted several trees and toppled electrical posts in the area.
- October 25, 2011 – A tornado struck villages in Pontevedra and Hinigaran in the province of Negros Occidental where it destroyed a total of 97 houses.

==== 2012 ====
- February 20, 2012 – An EF1 tornado struck a village in Kabankalan, Negros Occidental that resulted in 13 houses partially damaged and a 5-year old kid killed by an uprooted tree.
- March 13, 2012 – An EFU tornado damaged eight houses in New Washington, Aklan.
- March 29, 2012 – An EF1 tornado struck Bacolod, Negros Occidental at around 12:30 PhST. It damaged several buildings including the University of St. La Salle, uprooted several trees, and toppled electrical poles which resulted in a power outage that lasted for six hours. Vehicles were damaged after being hit by fallen trees, some roofs of houses were blown away, and two carinderias were destroyed.
- April 10, 2012 – An EF1 tornado struck two villages in Lake Sebu, South Cotabato at around 14:30 PhST where it destroyed at least 25 houses, killed a 12-year-old girl, and injured 2 others.
- April 12, 2012 – An EFU tornado struck Parang, Maguindanao del Norte at around 15:00 PhST where it destroyed at least 25 houses.
- May 14, 2012 – A tornado struck Norala, South Cotabato at around 15:00 PhST where it damaged 27 houses and uprooted trees, which initial total damages amounted up to ₱60,000.
- May 16, 2012 – A tornado struck a village in Pinamungajan, Cebu at around 13:00 PhST where it destroyed at least 68 houses, toppled trees, and injured 3 people.
- May 19, 2012 – An EFU tornado was reported in Hagonoy, Bulacan.
- May 22, 2012 – An EF1 tornado struck San Miguel, Bulacan at around 15:00 PhST where it damaged almost 50 houses.
- June 20, 2012 – An EFU tornado struck Santo Niño, South Cotabato and caused damages of up to ₱80,000.
- June 30, 2012 – An EFU tornado struck Antipas, Cotabato where it destroyed around ₱2 million worth of plantations.
- July 21, 2012 – An EFU tornado spawned by Typhoon Vicente (Ferdie) struck Bulan, Sorsogon where it damaged four houses and a fishing boat.
- July 27, 2012 – An EF1 tornado struck Jagna, Bohol at around 11:00 PhST where it damaged at least 85 houses and 13 pump boats which amounted to at least ₱1.3 million.
- July 30, 2012 – A tornado struck Silay, Negros Occidental at around 19:30 PhST where it destroyed a house and damaged 23 others. It also swept two schools in the town where it destroyed multiple classrooms, a canteen, and a stage. One of those schools were almost completely destroyed. A person was killed after being hit by a falling tree. Fifteen minutes later, the tornado went through the nearby town of Enrique B. Magalona where it destroyed four houses and damaged 130 others. It also struck a school where it destroyed three classrooms and damaged five others. A 14-year-old was injured after being hit by flying debris.
- August 27, 2012 – A tornado struck five villages in San Fernando, Pampanga where it destroyed at least 30 houses and damaged power cables.
- September 7, 2012 – An EF0 landspout was spotted on a village in Cebu City at 17:15 PhST.
- September 15, 2012 – A tornado struck Kabasalan, Zamboanga Sibugay at 03:15 PhST. It damaged several houses and buildings, including the town's public market, which lasted for 5 minutes. Only one person was confirmed to be injured, caused by a corrugated galvanized iron sheet that was flung, while the actual true number of people injured were undetermined.
- September 23, 2012 – An EF1 tornado struck Quezon City at around 17:30 PhST where it damaged almost 120 houses.

Tornadoes spawned by Typhoon Son-Tinh on October 25, 2012
Several tornadoes were spawned during Typhoon Son-Tinh (Ofel). In Infanta, a tornado destroyed at least 15 houses and a child was injured after they were hit by a fallen tree. In Panukulan, around 29 houses were damaged by another tornado. Meanwhile, four houses were damaged in Lucena and three houses were damaged in General Nakar after being hit by tornadoes. In Tiaong, another tornado damaged two houses.
EF#	Area	Province	Casualties
EFU	Infanta	Quezon	1 injured
EFU	Panukulan	Quezon	None
–	Lucena	Quezon	None
–	General Nakar	Quezon	None
EFU	Tiaong	Quezon	None

- December 4, 2012 – An EFU tornado spawned by Typhoon Bopha (Pablo) struck Alicia, Zamboanga Sibugay where it damaged four houses and a warehouse.

==== 2013 ====
- March 25, 2013 – A tornado capsized an overloaded boat carrying 18 people as it traveled through Liguasan Marsh and killed 12 people, including children.
- April 26, 2013 – An EF1 tornado struck two villages in Bustos, Bulacan where it damaged at least 16 houses.
- May 3, 2013 – An EF1 tornado struck five villages in Paniqui, Tarlac at around 15:00 PhST where it destroyed 49 houses and damaged 205 others. It affected a total of 1095 people as it swept through the area.
- May 8, 2013 – A tornado struck Santa Ignacia, Tarlac where it damaged five houses, uprooted trees, and toppled electrical posts.
- May 10, 2013 – An EFU tornado was spotted in Orion, Bataan.
- May 14, 2013 – An EF1 tornado was spotted in Santa Catalina, Ilocos Sur.
- May 22, 2013 – A tornado struck Natividad, Pangasinan where it damaged a warehouse and the ceiling of classrooms from a nearby school.
- May 24, 2013 – An EFU tornado struck a village in Polomolok, South Cotabato at around 13:00 PhST where it destroyed 8 houses that amounted to ₱500,000 and affected at least 33 families. Meanwhile, another EF1 tornado struck San Miguel, Bulacan where it damaged at least 3 houses.
- May 28, 2013 – An EFU tornado struck multiple towns in the province of Iloilo at around 11:30 PhST. In Estancia, 48 boats were destroyed which amounted to ₱3.5 million and 10 people were injured. In Carles, 6 boats were also destroyed. In Barotac Neuvo, one house was destroyed and two others were damaged. In Jaro, Iloilo CIty, a total of 6 houses were destroyed and 30 others were damaged.
- May 29, 2013 – An EF1 tornado struck San Pablo, Zamboanga del Sur at around 05:30 PhST where it destroyed at least 9 houses and damaged 12 others which affected 28 families. Meanwhile, an anticyclonic multi-vortex EF1 wedge tornado struck Davao City where it damaged 20 houses and uprooted trees near the University of the Philippines Mindanao.
- June 8, 2013 – A tornado accompanied by hail struck Urdaneta, Pangasinan where it damaged several houses and toppled trees. It also damaged three classrooms from a school.
- June 18, 2013 – The Minglanilla–Talisay tornado was an EF2 tornado that originated as a waterspout and struck the towns of Minglanilla and Talisay in the province of Cebu. At around 14:00 PhST, the tornado hit Minglanilla where it damaged more than 55 houses, an animal feeds factory, and lamp posts which amounted to more than ₱1 million. It reached estimated wind speeds of 200 km/h (124 mph). Three people were injured and brought to a nearby hospital. It then reached Talisay at around 15:45 PhST where it damaged at least 7 houses and a school. A day later, Minglanilla was declared under the state of calamity after the tornado affected a total of 177 people.
- June 20, 2013 – Two EF1 tornadoes were spawned by Tropical Storm Bebinca (Fabian). In Brooke's Point, Palawan, an EF1 tornado damaged the Extramural Studies Center at Palawan State University. In Looc, Occidental Mindoro, another EF1 tornado damaged two houses.
- June 29, 2013 – An EF1 tornado spawned by Tropical Storm Rumbia (Gorio) struck Jomalig, Quezon where it damaged a total of 42 houses and injured 4 children, including a 2-month old baby.
- July 2, 2013 – A tornado struck four villages in Dumanjug, Cebu where it destroyed houses and toppled trees, which affected 19 families.
- July 8, 2013 – An EFU tornado struck two villages in President Quirino, Sultan Kudarat where it damaged 25 houses.
- July 17, 2013 – Three EFU tornadoes was spotted in Santa Rosa, Laguna. No damages were reported.
- August 4, 2013 – A torrnado struck Jagna, Bohol where it blew away roofs of at least five houses, toppled banana trees and electrical posts.
- September 5, 2013 – A tornado struck Kabankalan, Negros Occidental after a downpour at around 14:30 PhST where it uprooted trees and damaged sugarcane plantations which amounted to around ₱100,000.
- September 20, 2013 – An EFU tornado spawned by Typhoon Usagi (Odette) struck Bago, Negros Occidental where it destroyed 4 houses and partially damaged 9 others.
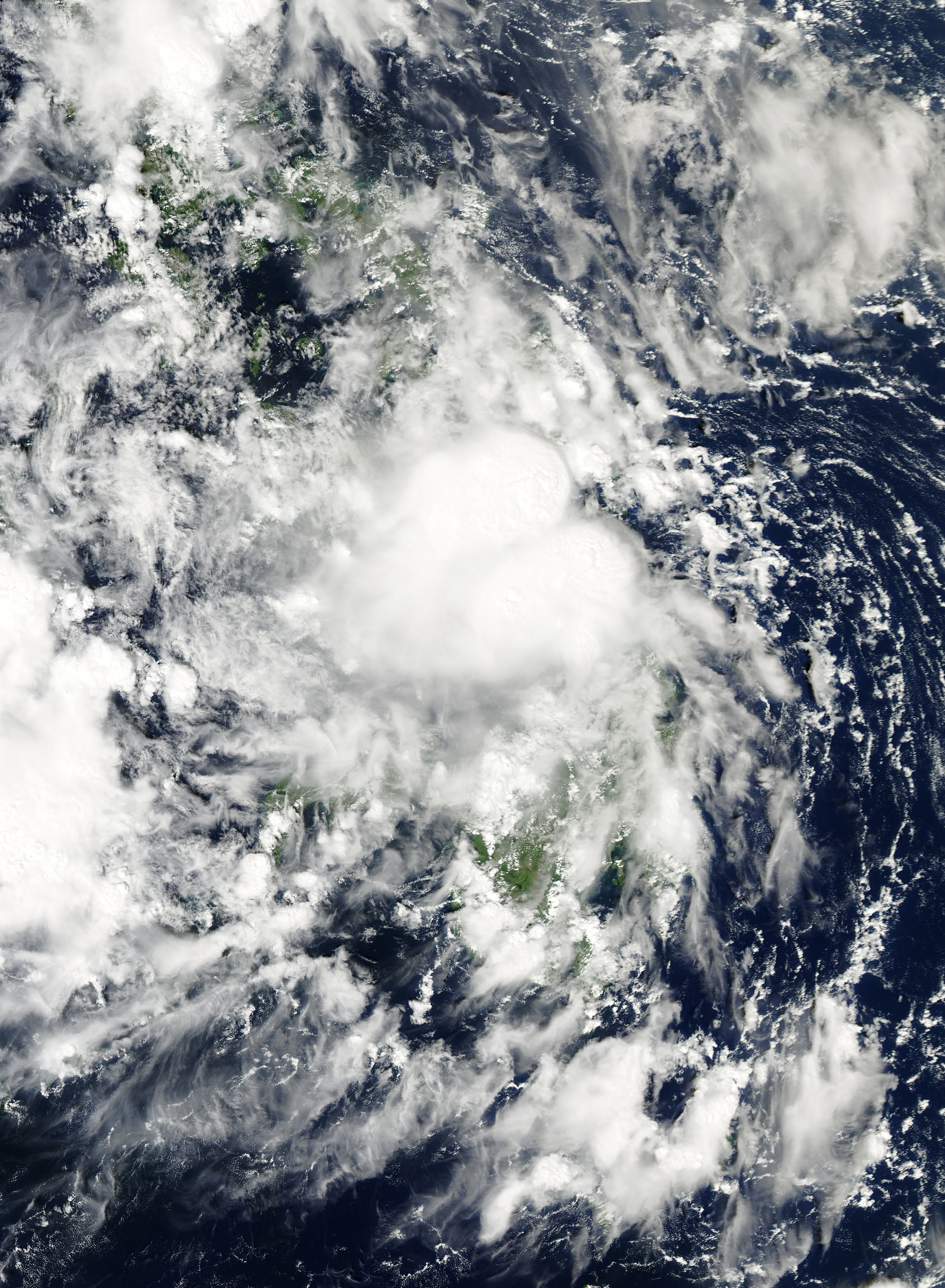
  A satellite view of Tropical Depression Wilma (2013) which spawned tornadoes that hit Metro Cebu and Metro Iloilo
- November 4, 2013 – Two tornadoes were influenced by Tropical Depression Wilma (2013). At around 20:00 PhST, an EF2 tornado struck Metro Cebu where it damaged multiple buildings, including a local mall, damaged houses with roofs blown away, uprooted trees, and injured 13 people. It originated from a thunderstorm in northern Bohol where it developed and crossed the Cebu Strait towards Olango Island before it touched down. The tornado proceeded to head towards Lapu-Lapu City and Mandaue where most of the damages occurred, before it moved north towards the towns of Compostela and Danao, later dissipated in Carmen. At 22:00 PhST, another EF1 tornado struck Metro Iloilo where 68 houses were destroyed and 122 others were damaged. Among the towns in Metro Iloilo, Pavia was hit the hardest with 39 houses destroyed and 85 others damaged.
- November 7, 2013 – An EF1 tornado struck Pikit, Cotabato at around 05:00 PhST where it injured a person and killed 2 people from an uprooted tree, including a 1-year old baby.
- November 8, 2013 – A tornado spawned by Typhoon Haiyan (Yolanda) struck Jagna, Bohol where it damaged 5 houses.^{12:27-12:51}

==== 2014 ====
- February 8, 2014 – A tornado struck two villages in M'lang, Cotabato where it damaged several hectares of plantation worth at least ₱3.5 million.
- February 10, 2014 – A tornado struck a village in Zamboanga City at around 17:30 PhST where it destroyed a house and nearby warehouse. It injured a person who was hit by flying debris.
- April 8, 2014 – An EF1 tornado struck a village in Cebu City at 14:08 PhST where it damaged at least 29 houses and a sports complex. It also injured a person that tried to run away for safety.
- April 20, 2014 – An EFU tornado struck two villages in General Santos at around 13:30 PhST where it destroyed at least 27 houses and damaged 77 others.
- April 23, 2014 – An EFU tornado struck Magsaysay, Davao del Sur where it damaged 13 houses.
- April 28, 2014 – A tornado struck San Carlos, Pangasinan where it destroyed around 20 houses.
- April 29, 2014 – A tornado struck a village in Muntinlupa where it damaged 55 houses. A state of calamity was declared a day later.
- May 19, 2014 – An EF1 tornado struck Jaen, Nueva Ecija where it damaged nearby homes and a roof from a school was blown away. Meanwhile, three towns in South Cotabato were struck by another tornado which damaged several houses and affected 50 families. In San Nicolas, Pangasinan, an EF1 tornado tornado damaged houses and toppled trees.
- May 23, 2014 – A tornado accompanied by a hailstorm struck Cauayan, Isabela where it damaged houses and toppled a concrete wall, which led to 2 people killed.
- May 24, 2014 – An EF1 tornado struck Midsayap, Cotabato where it toppled trees and damaged houses that killed 2 people and injured a person.
- June 27, 2014 – A tornado struck Calbayog, Samar at around 15:15 PhST where it destroyed 85 houses, most were made of light materials. It affected around 500 people and caused three "casualties".
- July 1, 2014 – An EF1 tornado struck Malasiqui, Pangasinan where it damaged five houses.
- July 14, 2014 – An EF1 tornado struck South Upi, Maguindanao del Sur at around 11:00 PhST where it destroyed 12 houses, three school buildings, and hectares of crops. Meanwhile, another EF1 tornado struck Villasis, Pangasinan at 17:00 PhST where it damaged several houses and injured a person.
- July 25, 2014 – An EFU tornado struck Calasiao, Pangasinan where it snapped trees and blew away roofs of nearby houses.
- July 29, 2014 – A tornado struck a village in Digos, Davao del Sur around 17:00 PhST where it damaged eight houses made of light materials and two fishing boats, it also toppled large trees that damaged houses. Property damage was initially estimated at P100,000 ($2,302.00 USD).
- August 15, 2014 – The 2014 Macabebe tornado was an EF2 stovepipe tornado that struck Sitio Mindanao in Macabebe, Pampanga at around 18:00 PhST. Lasting less than 30 minutes, it completely destroyed 19 houses with some were completely flattened or had its roof ripped away, and leaving about 110 people homeless and causing minor injuries.
- September 12, 2014 – An EFU tornado spawned by Typhoon Kalmaegi (Luis) struck Parang, Maguindanao del Norte where it collapsed roofs and knocked down electrical posts.
- September 18, 2014 – An EF1 tornado spawned by Tropical Storm Fung-wong (Mario) ripped away the roofs of several classrooms of Southwestern University in Cebu City.
- September 22, 2014 – An EF1 tornado struck San Fernando, Pampanga where it damaged several buildings, including the Central Luzon Television (CLTV 36) station, toppled billboards, and exploded multiple electrical transformers.
- October 14, 2014 – An EF1 tornado struck Valencia, Bukidnon destroyed 3 houses and damaged 31 others. It also uprooted trees that caused a power outage in the town and other nearby areas in the province.
- October 22, 2014 – An EF1 tornado struck Isabela, Negros Occidental at around 13:20 PhST. It damaged a total of 106 houses, a health center, a public market, and a school which lasted for 15 minutes. Two people were injured.
- October 24, 2014 – An EF1 tornado struck Carmen, Cotabato.
- October 25, 2014 – Another EF1 tornado struck Carmen, Cotabato.
- November 30, 2014 – An EF1 tornado struck Datu Salibo, Maguindanao del Sur where it damaged several houses and fish pens in the area.

==== 2015 ====
- April 7, 2015 – An EF1 tornado struck Alamada, Cotabato where it damaged 30 houses.
- April 12, 2015 – An EF1 tornado struck M'lang, Cotabato where it damaged 15 houses and 11 school buildings, including a grandstand.
- April 16, 2015 – An EF1 tornado struck Kabacan, Cotabato where it damaged 27 houses.
- April 20, 2015 – An EFU tornado struck four villages in Kidapawan, Cotabato shortly before 19:00 PhST where it damaged ₱2 million worth of banana plantations.
- April 27, 2015 – An EF1 tornado struck a village in Kidapawan, Cotabato where it damaged at least 5,000 banana plantations.
- April 29, 2015 – An EF1 tornado struck two villages in Tantangan, South Cotabato at around 16:00 PhST where it damaged a total of 30 houses and uprooted trees. Meanwhile, another EF1 tornado struck four villages in Kidapawan, Cotabato where it damaged agricultural crops and two building centers.
- May 6, 2015 – An EF1 tornado struck San Pedro, Laguna at around 16:00 PhST where it damaged approximately 50 houses, uprooted trees, and caused a power outage. An 11-year old kid was injured after getting hit by flying debris.
- May 27, 2015 – A tornado was spotted in Alabat, Quezon.
- June 5, 2015 – An EF1 tornado struck a village in Asingan, Pangasinan where it damaged 26 houses, several hectares of crops, and a funeral home. It also injured a person after they were hit by shards of glass.
- June 10, 2015 – A tornado struck Zamboanga City at 19:00 PhST where it destroyed at least 28 houses and injured a person.
- June 13, 2015 – An EF1 tornado struck Bayambang, Pangasinan where it damaged several houses and affected 87 families. Three villages in the town declared a state of calamity days later.
- June 23, 2015 – A tornado struck Banga, South Cotabato where it damaged 30 houses, tore off a roof of a local School, Several Large trees and Power poles were Knocked down, and Banana and a local agricultural sector took a hit as banana plantations and cornfields were heavily flattened.
- July 9, 2015 – An EFU tornado that originated as a waterspout moved through Iba, Zambales.
- July 23, 2015 – A tornado accompanied by hailstorm struck four villages in San Antonio, Quezon around 14:45 PhST where it destroyed nine houses and partially damaged a school. No casualties were reported.
- July 26, 2015 – An EF1 tornado struck San Luis, Pampanga where it damaged a total of 42 houses.
- August 13, 2015 – The 2015 Pikit tornado was an EF2 tornado that struck several residential communities in Pikit, Cotabato at around 15:30 PhST. It destroyed approximately 151 houses as roofs were torn apart or were hit by fallen trees, while two school buildings and a mosque were damaged. The incident left 7 people injured by flying debris.
- August 27, 2015 – An EF1 tornado struck the towns of Banga and Santo Niño in the province of South Cotabato where it flattened around 90 houses.
- October 18, 2015 – An EF1 tornado struck Tukuran, Zamboanga del Sur where it destroyed more than 15 buildings, including a police station.
- November 10, 2015 – An EF1 tornado struck Davao City at around 14:00 PhST where it toppled trees and electrical posts.
- November 11, 2015 – A tornado struck M'lang, Cotabato where it blew away roofs of houses and branches of trees.

==== 2016 ====
- May 4, 2016 – An EFU tornado struck Kabankalan, Negros Occidental at 10:35 PhST. More than 90 houses, two school buildings, and a chapel were damaged when it struck a village in the town. The tornado also left 3 people injured.
- July 1, 2016 – An EFU tornado was spotted in Medellin, Cebu.
- July 5, 2016 – An EFU tornado struck Lamitan, Basilan where at least 21 houses were destroyed and trees were uprooted.
- July 31, 2016 – An EF1 tornado struck four villages in Baclayon, Bohol at around 17:30 PhST where it destroyed 12 houses, damaged 20 others, and uprooted trees.
- August 9, 2016 – A tornado accompanied with floods struck the towns of Valladolid and Pontevedra in the province of Negros Occidental where it destroyed 12 houses and damaged 23 others which affected 27 families.
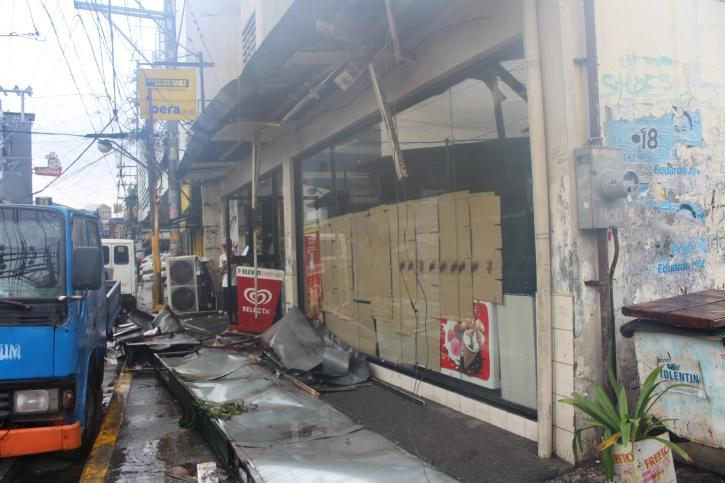
  A damaged convenience store caused by the Manila tornado
- August 14, 2016 – The Manila tornado was a rare multi-vortex EF1 tornado struck Metro Manila at around 16:30 PhST influenced by the southwest monsoon. It originated from a severe thunderstorm that was spotted over Manila Bay at 16:00 PhST moving northeast towards the metropolitan area. At 16:35 PhST, the tornado touched down in Baseco Compound and was seen traveling towards Intramuros and Sampaloc, before it dissipated in New Manila, Quezon City. It lasted for about 30 minutes and travelled for 9 km, it damaged more than 100 buildings, including the National Press Club in Intramuros, and injured 2 people. It also toppled electrical poles and uprooted trees in the area. It became one of the most well-documented and well-known tornado in the country.
- August 16, 2016 – An EFU tornado struck San Miguel, Bulacan at 22:30 PhST where it damaged around 20 houses and lasted for several minutes.
- August 30, 2016 – A tornado struck Tampakan, South Cotabato at around 15:00 PhST where it destroyed several houses and damaged agricultural crops. A person was injured when an uprooted tree fell onto a house.
- September 7, 2016 – An EF1 tornado struck Bogo, Cebu at around 16:30 PhST. It damaged around 17 houses, destroyed multiple shanties and pump boats. The tornado also injured 3 people as it swept through a village.
- October 21, 2016 – A tornado struck a village in Naval, Biliran where it destroyed a house, flattened rice field, and a number of missing livestock.
- October 26, 2016 – An EFU tornado was spotted in Iligan City.
- November 26, 2016 – An EF1 tornado struck a village in Moises Padilla, Negros Occidental at 14:30 PhST where it damaged around 21 houses.
- November 28, 2016 – An EFU tornado struck Tambulig, Zamboanga del Sur at 15:00 PhST where it destroyed 11 houses.
- December 13, 2016 – An EF1 tornado struck Manapla, Negros Occidental at around 12:45 PhST where it destroyed four houses and damaged 82 others, and injured two people. It also damaged a covered court and a church which combined had estimated damages of more than 4.1 million.

==== 2017 ====
- March 12, 2017 – A tornado was spotted in the University of the Philippines Diliman.
- April 2, 2017 – An EFU tornado struck an evacuation center in Mandaue, Cebu and injured a person.
- April 16, 2017 – A suspected tornado spawned by Tropical Depression Crising struck Carmen, Cebu and affected families.
- April 20, 2017 – An EFU tornado was spotted in Bula, Camarines Sur.
- May 4, 2017 – An EF1 tornado struck Umingan, Pangasinan where it toppled trees and electrical poles.
- June 15, 2017 – A tornado struck villages in Valladolid and Bago in the province of Negros Occidental at around 19:30 PhST while another tornado struck Bacolod in the same province at around 20:30 PhST. In Valladolid, eight houses and a poultry farm were damaged. A woman and her 15-year-old niece were also injured. In Bago, eleven houses were destroyed and six others were damaged. It toppled trees and injured 10 people, including a six-year-old girl. In Bacolod, a house was destroyed and nine houses were damaged. No casualties were reported in the town.
- June 16, 2017 – An EF1 tornado struck Bago, Negros Occidental at around 20:30 PhST where it destroyed four houses and damaged nine others. A total of 7 people were injured and 14 families were affected.
- June 24, 2017 – A doppler weather radar stationed in Hinatuan, Surigao del Sur detected strong low-level signatures from a severe thunderstorm that was capable of producing a tornado in San Francisco, Agusan del Sur, moving west with estimated wind speeds of up to 110 km/h (68 mph).
- June 25, 2017 – An EF1 tornado struck Tupi, South Cotabato where it destroyed two houses and partially damaged five others which amounted to nearly half a million pesos.
- June 28, 2017 – An EF1 tornado struck several villages in the towns of Mangatarem, Urbiztondo, and San Carlos in the province of Pangasinan where it damaged several houses and caused a power outage. One of the most hardest-hit areas was Urbiztondo.
- June 29, 2017 – An EFU tornado struck Calapan, Oriental Mindoro where it damaged houses and nearby stores.
- July 6, 2017 – An EFU tornado struck Himamaylan, Negros Occidental at around 16:00 PhST where it damaged more than 20 houses, blew off roofs of a school, and toppled trees.
- July 13, 2017 – An EFU tornado that originated as a waterspout was spotted in Orion, Bataan.
- July 19, 2017 – An EF1 tornado struck Lazi, Siquijor where it damaged eight houses and injured 4 people.
- August 8, 2017 – An EF1 tornado struck Datu Odin Sinsuat, Maguindanao del Norte where it damaged a newly built house.
- October 8, 2017 – An EF1 tornado struck Norala, South Cotabato where it damaged a total of 22 houses.
- October 17, 2017 – A doppler weather radar stationed in Hinatuan, Surigao del Sur detected a possible tornado in Impasugong, Bukidnon.
- October 19, 2017 – A doppler weather radar stationed in Hinatuan, Surigao del Sur detected a possible tornado in Esperanza, Agusan del Sur and Talakag, Bukidnon.
- November 20, 2017 – An EFU tornado struck Panitan, Capiz where a total of 8 houses were damaged.
- December 16, 2017 – A tornado spawned by Tropical Storm Kai-tak (Urduja) struck Caibiran, Biliran which resulted in a landslide that buried multiple houses and killed 14 people.
- December 22, 2017 – An EF1 tornado struck Norala, South Cotabato where it damaged several houses.

==== 2018 ====
- April 26, 2018 – An EF1 tornado struck Santa Cruz, Davao del Sur where it damaged ten houses and banana trees.
- June 5, 2018 – An EFU tornado and a hailstorm struck Santa Barbara, Iloilo where it destroyed one structure and partially damaged another. The tornado only lasted a few minutes in the area, and the accompanied hailstorm brought hail as small as human nails.
- June 14, 2018 – A tornado struck Bulakan, Bulacan where it uprooted trees and toppled electrical posts.
- July 3, 2018 – An EF1 tornado struck three villages in Concepcion, Tarlac where it partially damaged at least 63 houses, totally damaged 17 houses and injured 3 people. It also toppled trees and bamboos.
- July 13, 2018 – An EFU tornado struck Lamitan, Basilan at 10:00 PhST where it partially damaged four houses and toppled several trees.
- July 22, 2018 – An EF1 tornado struck Agdao district in Davao City at 20:45 PhST. It caused damages to houses and toppled trees. More than 300 people were evacuated and two people were injured.
- July 28, 2018 – An EF1 tornado struck three villages in Pagadian, Zamboanga del Sur at 16:00 PhST where it destroyed 20 houses and sari-sari stores.
- August 25, 2018 – An EF1 tornado struck Santa Cruz, Ilocos Sur where it damaged five houses. It also went through swept through towns of Santa Lucia and Salcedo.
- September 1, 2018 – An EFU tornado was spotted in Pulupandan, Negros Occidental.
- September 8, 2018 – An EF1 tornado struck Banga, South Cotabato where it damaged more than 31 houses.
- September 10, 2018 – A tornado struck President Quirino, Sultan Kudarat where it damaged 19 houses, and toppled trees and electrical posts.
- September 12, 2018 – An EF0 tornado hit Calabanga, Camarines Sur. No one was reported injured.
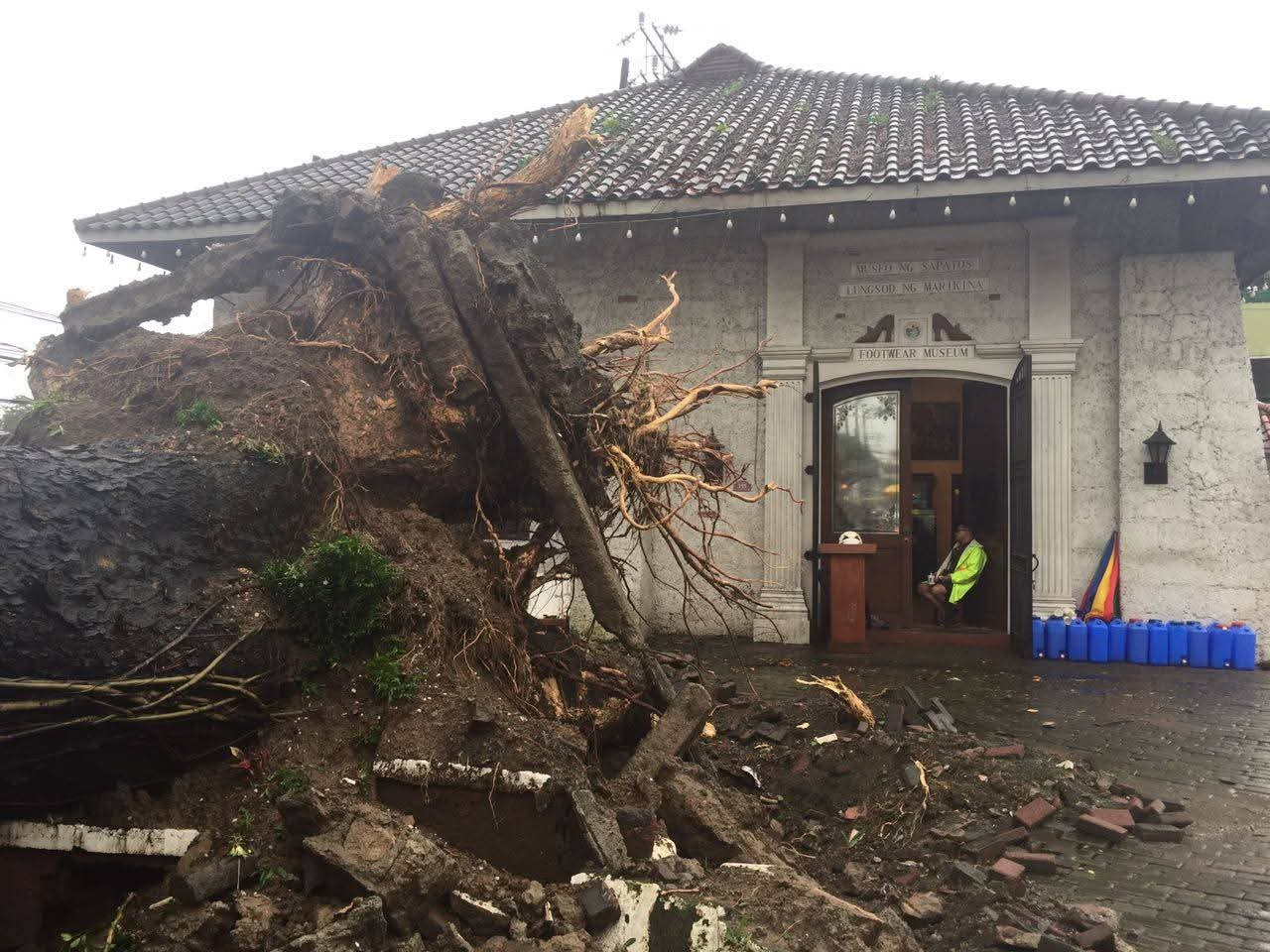
  An uprooted tree caused by an EF1 tornado near the Marikina Shoe Museum on September 14, 2018
- September 14, 2018 – An EF1 tornado spawned by Typhoon Mangkhut (Ompong) struck multiple areas in Marikina at around 17:00 PhST. Multiple structures including Marikina Shoe Museum and Kapitan Moy Residence were partially damaged and a century-old tree was uprooted. It left several houses damaged and injured 2 people after being electrocuted by a live wire.
- October 8, 2018 – An EF1 tornado struck Bayambang, Pangasinan where it damaged five houses and toppled trees.
- November 4, 2018 – A tornado struck Buug, Zamboanga Sibugay where it destroyed a store and a shanty. Power lines were toppled and properties worth around ₱70,000 were also destroyed.
- November 7, 2018 – An EF1 tornado struck Baguio district in Davao City at around 15:00 PhST where it damaged 13 houses and plantations worth ₱30,000.

==== 2019 ====
- March 5, 2019 – A tornado struck two villages in San Enrique, Negros Occidental at around 14:30 PhST in which 4 houses were destroyed and 16 others were damaged. It also blew the roof of a community rice mill.
- April 9, 2019 – An EF1 tornado struck two villages in Tacurong, Sultan Kudarat where it damaged more than 210 houses. Initial estimated costs of the damages reach around ₱15 million.
- May 21, 2019 – An EF1 tornado struck the towns of Canaman, Libmanan, and Pamplona in Camarines Sur where it destroyed 23 houses and damaged 87 others.
- May 27, 2019 – An EFU tornado struck two towns in Bulacan, where 27 houses were damaged in San Ildefonso while 24 houses were damaged in San Miguel.
- June 2, 2019 – An EF1 tornado struck three villages in San Enrique, Negros Occidental in which 3 houses were destroyed and 16 others were partially damaged.
- June 9, 2019 – An EF1 tornado struck M'lang, Cotabato where it toppled trees and damaged ten houses.
- June 20, 2019 – An EFU tornado struck San Jose del Monte, Bulacan where it destroyed a total of 5 houses and damaged 51 others.
- June 22, 2019 – An EF1 tornado struck Lemery, Batangas at around 14:30 PhST and damaged several houses.
- July 15, 2019 – An EFU tornado was spotted in Pototan, Iloilo at around 13:00 PhST.
- July 27, 2019 – A tornado struck Macabebe, Pampanga where it blew away a waiting shed and toppled electrical posts.
- July 29, 2019 – An EFU tornado struck two villages in Magalang, Pampanga around 13:00 PhST where it damaged multiple houses and a school building. It injured 7 people, five of whom were students from the school, after getting hit by fallen debris.

Tornadoes confirmed in Visayas and Mindanao on August 3, 2019
A series of tornadoes were reported across the country, with three in Visayas and one in Mindanao. In Negros Occidental, an EFU tornado damaged a total of 17 houses in La Carlota and 31 houses in Pontevedra. Another EFU tornado hit Lavezares, Northern Samar at around 09:30 PhST where it destroyed 11 houses and a public market. In Lapuz district, IloIlo City at 12:12 PhST, three minutes before a squall, a tornado spawned and affected 18 families. Meanwhile, a tornado struck Marogong, Lanao del Sur at around 16:00 PhST where it destroyed 15 houses, a mosque, and a school building. Four students from the school were injured.
EF#	Area	Province	Casualties
EFU	La Carlota & Pontevedra	Negros Occidental	None
EFU	Lavezares	Northern Samar	None
–	Iloilo City	Iloilo	None
–	Marogong	Lanao del Sur	4 injured

- August 8, 2019 – An EFU tornado struck Paluan, Occidental Mindoro where it destroyed a house and damaged 2 others.
- August 9, 2019 – An EFU tornado struck multiple towns in Abra where it resulted in a total of 7 houses damaged and rendered some families homeless.
- August 20, 2019 – An EF1 tornado struck Baguio district in Davao City where it damaged 17 houses and banana plantations, and toppled trees.
- August 27, 2019 – A tornado influenced by Tropical Storm Podul (Jenny) struck two villages in San Luis, Pampanga where it severely damaged nine houses and toppled a tree, which hit a car.
- September 18, 2019 – An EFU tornado struck Rizal, Occidental Mindoro where it destroyed 3 houses and damaged 10 others.
- October 20, 2019 – A tornado struck Tupi, South Cotabato at around 15:00 PhST where it damaged houses and business establishments. It toppled power lines and uprooted decade-old trees in the area.
- October 22, 2019 – An EFU tornado was spotted in Nabua, Camarines Sur at around 12:00 PhST.
- October 31, 2019 – An EFU tornado was spotted in Miagao, Iloilo at around 16:00 PhST.
- November 4, 2019 – An EF1 tornado struck five villages in Marawi at around 14:00 PhST where it destroyed several houses and a portion of the roof of a city hall.
- November 6, 2019 – An EFU tornado struck two villages in San Jose, Antique where it left a total of 24 houses damaged.
- December 25, 2019 – An EF1 tornado spawned by Typhoon Phanfone (Ursula) struck two villages in Calapan, Oriental Mindoro where it damaged at least 5 houses and injured a person. A 50-year old local market also suffered major damage inflicted by the tornado.

=== 2020s ===
==== 2020 ====
- April 27, 2020 – An EFU tornado struck Bayambang, Pangasinan where it damaged a total of 23 houses.
- May 14, 2020 – An EFU tornado struck Lagangilang, Abra where it damaged a total of two houses.
- May 28, 2020 – An EF1 tornado struck a village in Santo Domingo, Nueva Ecija where it damaged 6 houses. Two people were injured after the tornado blew away their tricycle. Meanwhile, another tornado struck Lambayong, Sultan Kudarat where it damaged 12 houses and toppled banana plantations.
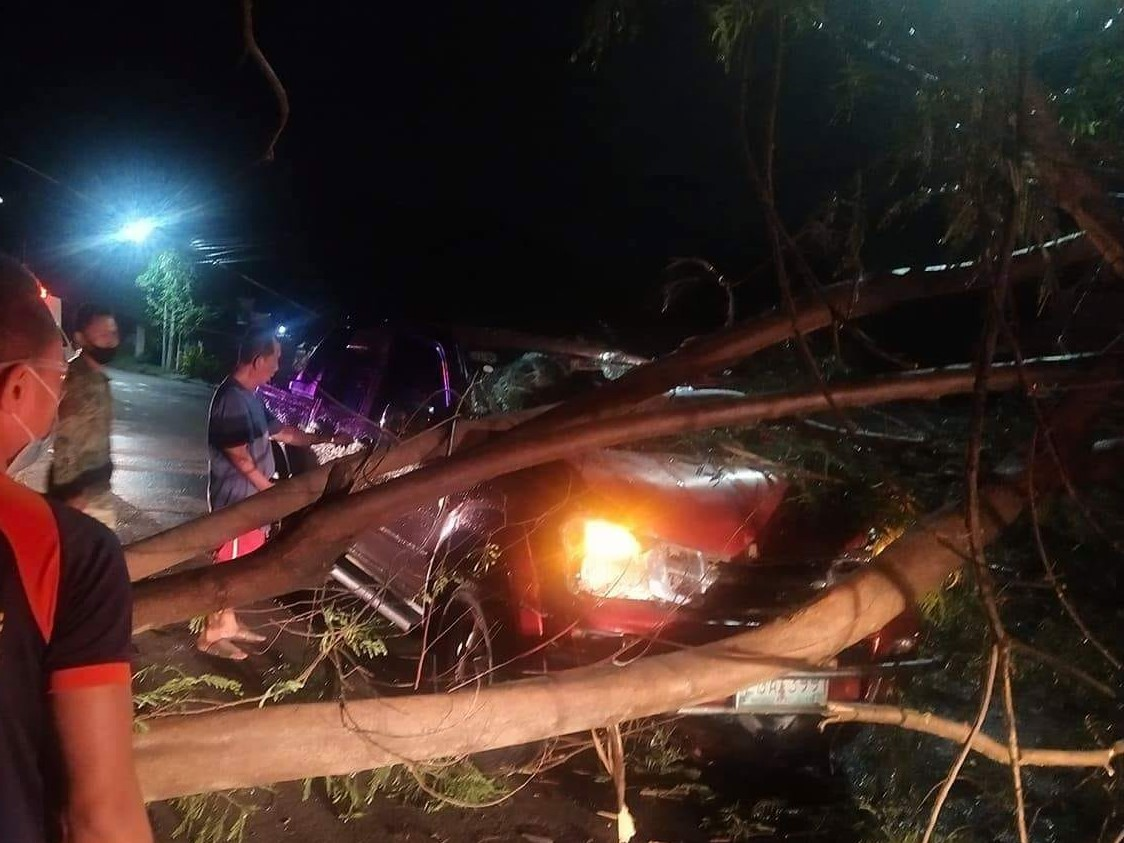
  A toppled tree that struck a car caused by an EF2 tornado in General Santos on June 4, 2020
- June 4, 2020 – An EF2 tornado struck a village and portions of the central business district in General Santos an hour after midnight. It damaged approximately 43 houses, toppled electrical poles, and uprooted trees. It also struck parts of the city's downtown area where it toppled trees and scattered debris near SM City General Santos.
- June 7, 2020 – An EF1 tornado struck President Quirino, Sultan Kudarat where it destroyed more than 30 houses.
- June 9, 2020 – An EF1 tornado struck Villasis, Pangasinan where it damaged 5 houses and uprooted trees.
- June 14, 2020 – An EFU tornado struck two villages in Castillejos, Zambales where it toppled power lines and trees, and damaged several houses.
- June 19, 2020 – An EF1 tornado struck Llanera, Nueva Ecija where it damaged roofs of nearby houses and toppled trees.
- June 25, 2020 – An EFU tornado struck Anao, Tarlac where it destroyed a total of 15 houses.
- July 2, 2020 – An EFU tornado was spotted in Oas, Albay while another EFU tornado was spotted in Pontevedra, Negros Occidental.
- July 8, 2020 – A tornado struck five villages in Senator Ninoy Aquino, Sultan Kudarat where it damaged a total of 17 houses.
- July 17, 2020 – An EFU tornado was spotted in Victoria, Laguna. Corrugated galvanized iron sheets were seen carried away by the tornado as it touched down.
- July 18, 2020 – A tornado struck Hermosa, Bataan where it damaged several houses and plantations.
- August 5, 2020 – An EF1 tornado struck six villages in Tudela, Misamis Occidental where it damaged a total of 109 houses. It also uprooted trees, damaged plantations, and injured four people in the area.
- September 22, 2020 – An EFU tornado struck Lambayong, Sultan Kudarat where it damaged a total of 33 houses.
- October 7, 2020 – An EFU tornado was spotted in Irosin, Sorsogon.
- October 14, 2020 – An EF1 tornado struck Lupon, Davao Oriental where it damaged houses and toppled trees in the area.
- October 20, 2020 – An EF1 tornado struck Calatrava, Negros Occidental at around 12:00 PhST where it destroyed a total of 5 houses and damaged 17 others. It also damaged a local daycare center in the area.
- November 12, 2020 – A tornado struck Samal, Davao del Norte where it damages several houses and plantations, and toppled trees.
- November 22, 2020 – A tornado accompanied by flash floods struck a village in Iligan City where it damaged at least 76 houses.

==== 2021 ====
- March 4, 2021 – An EFU tornado was spotted in Naga, Camarines Sur.
- March 24, 2021 – An EF2 tornado in Esperanza, Agusan del Sur left a total of 32 houses partially damaged. It also damaged a materials recycling facility and a waiting shed.
- April 5, 2021 – An EF1 tornado struck Daniel Z. Romauldez Airport in Tacloban at 18:28 PhST. It damaged a portion of the ceiling of the airport terminals, shattered windows, and toppled vehicles. The cost of the damages were estimated less ₱1 million. The tornado did not impact airport operations.
- May 5, 2021 – An EFU tornado struck Molo district in Iloilo City where it destroyed a total of 8 houses and damaged 22 others.
- May 10, 2021 – A tornado struck a village in Bayambang, Pangasinan where it blew away the roof of a house.
- May 11, 2021 – A tornado struck areas in the province of Tarlac where it toppled nearby trees.
- May 16, 2021 – An EF0 tornado hit Lemery, Batangas and lasted for around two minutes. No one was reported injured.
- May 21, 2021 – An EFU tornado struck Lagangilang, Abra where it damaged a house.
- May 23, 2021 – An EFU struck Asingan, Pangasinan where it destroyed four houses and partially damaged 21 others. The total costs of the damages reach up to ₱1 million.
- May 28, 2021 – An EFU tornado struck Pototan, Iloilo where it destroyed a house and partially damaged 14 others.
- May 30, 2021 – A tornado influenced by Tropical Storm Choi-wan (Dante) struck Medellin, Cebu where it damaged at least four houses.
- May 31, 2021 – A long-lived EFU landspout tornado struck five villages in Tumauini, Isabela at around 16:30 PhST, where it damaged houses, affecting 11 families, toppling trees and utility posts that caused power outages in the area. The tornado also lasted for 30 minutes.
- June 5, 2021 – An EFU tornado was spotted in Sara, Iloilo.
- June 25, 2021 – An EFU tornado struck ten villages in Lambunao, Iloilo at around 16:00 PhST where it damaged at least 42 houses.
- June 27, 2021 – A waterspout struck a coastal village in Olutanga, Zamboanga Sibugay where it destroyed five houses and two boats, and injured 2 people.
- July 18, 2021 – An EFU tornado was spotted on a mountain in Tacloban.
- August 20, 2021 – An EFU tornado was spotted in Pavia, Iloilo.
- August 27, 2021 – An EF1 tornado struck La Castellana and Enrique B. Magalona in the province of Negros Occidental at around 16:00 PhST. It destroyed seven houses worth around ₱50,000 and injured a 2-year old kid.
- August 31, 2021 – An EFU tornado struck Kabacan, Cotabato where it destroyed 18 houses and partially damaged 25 others.
- September 23, 2021 – An EFU tornado struck Tayug, Pangasinan where it destroyed 4 houses and partially damaged 27 others.
- October 10, 2021 – A tornado struck Zamboanga City at around 13:30 PhST where it damaged at least 26 houses.
- October 12, 2021 – A tornado struck Zarraga, Iloilo where it partially damaged a house.
- November 9, 2021 – An EF1 tornado struck two villages in Sacol Island in Zamboanga City around 13:00 PhST, where it destroyed 10 houses, damaged two boats and a madrasa, it also toppled trees.
- November 14, 2021 – An EF1 tornado struck two villages in Matalam, Cotabato where it damaged at least 36 houses and 14 hectares of agricultural crops.

==== 2022 ====
- February 1, 2022 – An EF1 tornado struck seven villages in Kabuntalan, Maguindanao del Norte at around 18:00 PhST. It damaged seven houses and slightly destroyed 27 others that are made of light and concrete materials, which displaced more than a hundred people. The tornado left two people injured.
- March 11, 2022 – An EF1 tornado struck the town of Pangutaran in Usada Island where it destroyed 40 houses, injured 2 people, and killed a person.
- March 15, 2022 – A tornado struck four villages in South Upi, Maguindanao del Sur where it destroyed 88 houses and partially damaged 72 others. Three people were injured after being hit by flying debris.
- March 16, 2022 – An EFU tornado struck San Carlos, Pangasinan where it destroyed a house and damaged six others.
- March 18, 2022 – A strong tornado struck two villages in Bambang, Nueva Vizcaya where it affected at least 25 households and 119 people.
- March 25, 2022 – An EFU tornado struck two villages in Lambunao, Iloilo where it destroyed a house and damaged 13 others.
- May 19, 2022 – A rain-wrapped EFU tornado in General Trias, Cavite around 14: 30 PhST, where it damaged 101 houses and left approximately 357 individuals homeless. A person was reportedly injured after a wall of their house collapsed on them.
- May 25, 2022 – Two villages in Talavera, Nueva Ecija were hit by an EF1 tornado, leaving at least 18 houses damaged, destroyed several crops, and toppled electric posts.
- April 21, 2022 – An EF1 tornado struck Cotabato City at around 17:00 PhST where it damaged a total of 60 houses near Rio Grande de Mindanao. It also damaged multiple pump boats and injured a person.
- June 2, 2022 – An EFU tornado struck M'lang, Cotabato where it damaged a total of 345 houses. Three people were injured when the tornado struck several villages in the area during a heavy rainfall.
- June 24, 2022 – An EF1 rope tornado struck Pototan, Iloilo at around 17:15 PhST where it damaged a nearby house.
- June 28, 2022 – An EF1 tornado struck Batangas City at around 15:00 PhST where it lifted multiple roofs of houses and a covered court. It also caused a power outage in the area.
- July 10, 2022 – An anticyclonic EF0 tornado was spotted in Pamplona, Camarines Sur.
- July 11, 2022 – An EF1 tornado struck Digos, Davao del Sur at around 17:00 PhST where it damaged around 19 houses.
- July 14, 2022 – An EFU tornado was spotted in Viga, Catanduanes at 14:17 PhST.
- July 18, 2022 – An EFU tornado struck San Narciso, Quezon where it damaged a total of 12 houses.
- July 23, 2022 – An EFU tornado accompanied by floods struck New Lucena, Iloilo where it damaged a total of 42 houses.
- July 25, 2022 – An EFU tornado struck Bautista, Pangasinan where it left 10 houses damaged.
- July 26, 2022 – An EF1 tornado struck Dasol, Pangasinan at around 17:45 PhST where it damaged several houses.
- August 5, 2022 – An EFU tornado was spotted in San Dionisio, Iloilo.
- August 12, 2022 – An EFU tornado struck Valencia, Bukidnon where it damaged a total of 11 houses.
- August 19, 2022 – An EFU tornado struck Floridablanca, Pampanga where it damaged a total of four houses.
- August 28, 2022 – An EFU tornado was spotted in Mangaldan, Pangasinan.
- August 29, 2022 – An EF1 tornado struck a coastal village in Limay, Bataan where it damaged around 13 houses.
- September 3, 2022 – An EF1 tornado struck Botolan, Zambales at around 19:30 PhST where it damaged several houses and toppled trees.
- September 9, 2022 – An EFU tornado was spotted in Mandaue, Cebu before a heavy downpour minutes after. It exploded electrical transformers as it swept through the area, scattered debris, and injured three people.
- September 20, 2022 – An EFU tornado struck President Roxas, Capiz where it destroyed 2 houses and damaged another.
- October 2, 2022 – An EF1 tornado struck Pagadian, Zamboanga del Sur where it damaged several houses and fishing boats.
- October 4, 2022 – An EFU tornado struck five villages in Basista, Pangasinan where it destroyed three houses and damaged seven others.
- October 30, 2022 – An EF1 tornado spawned by Tropical Storm Nalgae (Paeng) struck Pototan, Iloilo at around 22:00 PhST where it damaged 24 houses.
- November 8, 2022 – An EFU tornado struck Ampatuan, Maguindanao del Sur at around 16:40 PhST where it damaged more than 20 houses and stores, and toppled electrical posts.
- November 23, 2022 – An EF1 tornado struck several villages in Iligan City where it damaged a total of 49 houses.
- December 9, 2022 – An EF0 tornado hit Odiongan, Romblon at around 11:22 PhST.
- December 24, 2022 – An EFU tornado struck Guiuan, Eastern Samar at around 07:10 PhST where it damaged at least 12 houses and four motor boats.

==== 2023 ====
- January 3, 2023 – An EF1 tornado struck Arevalo district in Iloilo City and nearby Oton, Iloilo at around 05:30 PhST where it damaged more than 200 houses and injured 2 people after an uprooted coconut tree hit their house. Meanwhile, another EFU tornado hit Lambunao, Iloilo at around 23:00 PhST where it damaged 22 houses.
- March 18, 2023 – An EF1 tornado struck Alabel, Sarangani where it damaged around 30 houses and several plantations.
- May 1, 2023 – An EF1 tornado struck Datu Blah T. Sinsuat, Maguindanao del Norte at around 16:00 PhST where it destroyed four houses, damaged several boats, and uprooted trees. Meanwhile, another EF1 tornado struck Manaoag, Pangasinan at around 17:30 PhST where it toppled trees and electrical posts.
- May 18, 2023 – An EFU tornado struck Kabankalan, Negros Occidental where it damaged a total of 13 houses.
- May 25, 2023 – An EFU tornado struck Anao, Tarlac where it destroyed a house and damaged five others.
- June 14, 2023 – An EFU tornado struck Tambulig, Zamboanga del Sur where it damaged nine houses, a sari-sari store, and a pig farm. Trees were toppled in the area and the tornado brought estimated damages of up to ₱314,000.
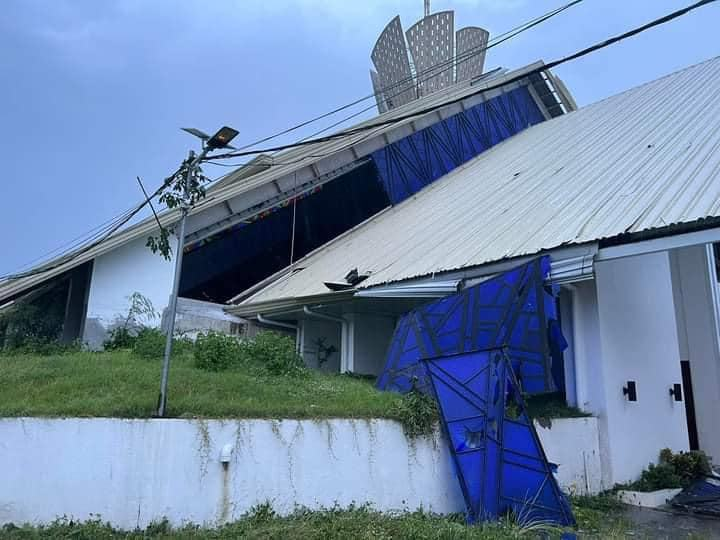
  A damaged church caused by an EF1 tornado in Bacolor, Pampanga on June 22, 2023
- June 22, 2023 – The Bacolor tornado was an EF1 tornado that struck two villages in Bacolor, Pampanga at around 17:30 PhST. It damaged 33 structures, including multiple houses, a church, and a gasoline station. Trees were uprooted and a power outage occurred after the tornado damaged several electrical posts. A total of three people were injured.
- June 26, 2023 – A tornado struck Polomolok, South Cotabato where it blew away roofs of houses and toppled trees in the area. Two of those houses were hit by fallen trees.
- July 2, 2023 – An anticyclonic EF1 tornado struck Milaor, Camarines Sur at around 15:00 PhST and damaged a nearby house.
- July 24, 2023 – An EF1 tornado spawned by Typhoon Doksuri (Egay) struck Vinzons, Camarines Norte at around 21:00 PhST where it damaged a total of 78 houses and 14 boats. It also damaged nearby structures, including a school building, and toppled trees.
- July 25, 2023 – A tornado struck three villages in Hilongos, Leyte at around 19:00 PhST where it damaged at least three houses, a gymnasium, and a store.
- August 9, 2023 – A tornado struck a village in Zamboanga City at around 08:10 PhST where it destroyed at least 36 houses, several stores, and a mosque. It also toppled power lines in the area and injured a person.
- August 12, 2023 – A tornado struck five villages in Badiangan, Iloilo where it damaged at least 33 houses, a multi-purpose hall, and multiple hectares of crops.
- August 30, 2023 – An EF1 tornado struck several establishments in Jaro district in Iloilo City at around 11:00 PhST where it damaged multiple buildings and injured 2 workers. No residential areas have been damaged during the incident.
- August 31, 2023 – An EF1 tornado struck the towns of San Vicente and San Ildefonso in Ilocos Sur where it damaged 21 houses.
- September 1, 2023 – An EFU tornado struck Alaminos, Pangasinan at around 21:45 PhST where it destroyed a house.
- September 3, 2023 – An EFU tornado struck several villages in Luna, La Union where it damaged a total of 13 houses.
- September 28, 2023 – An EFU tornado struck Balasan, Iloilo where it damaged a total of 18 houses.
- November 7, 2023 – An EF1 tornado struck Minalabac, Camarines Sur where it damaged a house on a rice field.
- December 9, 2023 – An EF1 tornado struck four villages in Kabacan, Cotabato where it damaged around 82 houses and almost a hundred hectares of rice fields.
- December 17, 2023 – An EFU tornado struck Kolambugan, Lanao del Norte at around 07:55 PhST where it damaged a total of ten houses.

==== 2024 ====
- January 15, 2024 – An EFU tornado struck San Remigio, Antique at around 14:30 PhST where it destroyed one house.
- January 29, 2024 – An EFU tornado struck Balungao, Pangasinan at around 14:40 PhST where it partially damaged a house.
- March 28, 2024 – An EF1 tornado struck the towns of Datu Montawal, Maguindanao del Sur and Kabacan, Cotabato where it destroyed around 40 houses. Several electrical posts were toppled and branches of trees were snapped.
- April 23, 2024 – An EF1 tornado struck Midsalip, Zamboanga del Sur where it damaged a total of 63 houses.
- April 25, 2024 – An EFU tornado struck Alcala, Cagayan where it destroyed three houses and toppled trees in the area.
- May 17, 2024 – An EFU tornado struck Malasiqui, Pangasinan at around 16:00 PhST where it destroyed a house.
- May 25, 2024 – An EF1 tornado spawned by Typhoon Ewiniar (Aghon) struck Lavezares, Northern Samar where it damaged a total of 12 houses, eight of which were destroyed, and a covered court.
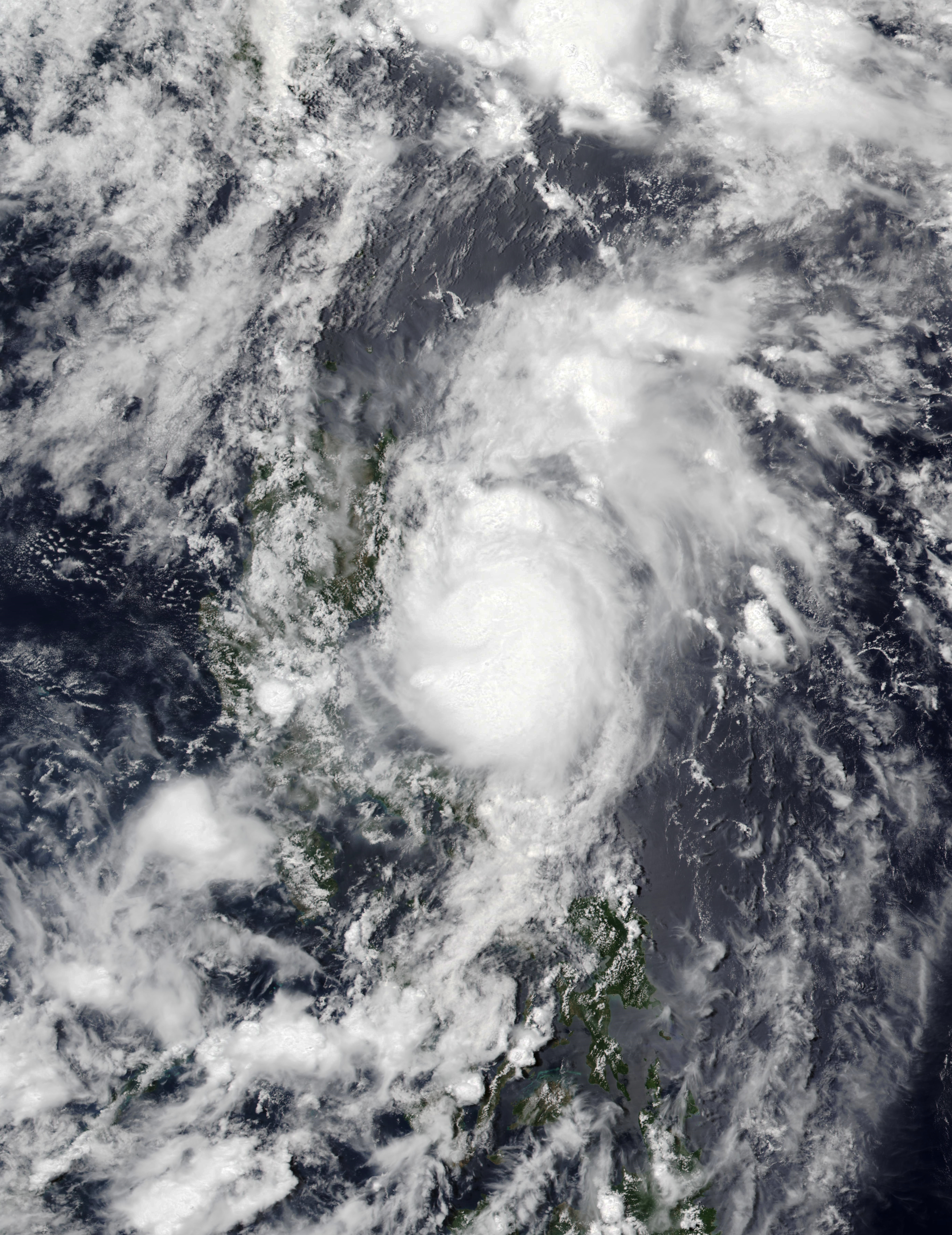
  A satellite view of Typhoon Ewiniar on May 27, 2024 which spawned an EF2 tornado in Arayat, Pampanga. The TC-influenced supercell can be seen on the left side of the typhoon.
- May 27, 2024 – The 2024 Arayat tornado was an EF2 tornado that was spawned by Typhoon Ewiniar (Aghon) and struck a village in Arayat, Pampanga at around 13:00 PhST. It destroyed around 30 houses and two school buildings, and toppled electrical posts. Satellite imagery and ground-level damages showed that the tornado formed a 2 km (1.24 mi) path as it swept the village and achieved estimated wind speeds of around 201 km/h (125 mph). Total estimated costs of infrastructure and agricultural damages reached ₱22 million and ₱8 million respectively.
- May 29, 2024 – An EF1 tornado struck Malaybalay, Bukidnon between 18:00 PhST and 19:00 PhST. It damaged a total of 32 houses, one of which was completely destroyed, and trees were uprooted.
- June 4, 2024 – An EF1 tornado struck several villages in Tapaz, Capiz at around 14:00 PhST where it damaged a total of 96 houses.
- June 5, 2024 – An EF1 tornado struck M'lang, Cotabato where it damaged several houses.
- June 13, 2024 – An EF1 tornado struck Cabatuan, Iloilo at around 16:00 PhST where it completey destroyed a house.
- June 24, 2024 – An EFU tornado struck Don Salvador Benedicto, Negros Occidental at around 07:00 PhST where it completely destroyed a house. Another EFU tornado struck Hinigaran, Negros Occidental at around 09:00 PhST where it completely destroyed two houses and partially damaged 12 others.
- June 26, 2024 – An EFU tornado struck Magsingal, Ilocos Sur at around 13:30 PhST where it partially damaged one house.
- June 29, 2024 – An EF1 tornado struck two villages in Asingan, Pangasinan at around 15:30 PhST where it completely destroyed two houses and partially damaged another.
- July 5, 2024 – An EF1 tornado formed near a river in Gabaldon, Nueva Ecija at around 17:00 PhST where it damaged cottages in the area.
- July 23, 2024 – An EF1 tornado struck Araceli, Palawan at around 19:00 PhST where it destroyed five houses and partially damaged 30 others. It also damaged plantations and toppled electrical posts which triggered a power outage in the area. A person was injured after being hit by a falling tree. Meanwhile, another EF1 tornado struck Tibiao, Antique where it damaged several houses.
- July 24, 2024 – An EF1 tornado struck San Andres, Romblon where it damaged eight houses, one of which collapsed completely, and toppled an electrical pole which resulted in a power outage.
- August 4, 2024 – An EF1 tornado struck Sangley Point, Cavite City where it was seen scattering debris and sweeping a sidecar.
- August 7, 2024 – A tornado swept through Cabanatuan, Nueva Ecija where it overturned a hut, damaged fences, and toppled trees in the area.
- August 10, 2024 – A tornado struck villages in Basista and Urbiztondo in the province of Pangasinan where it damaged a total of 26 houses and almost destroyed a pig farm. It toppled trees in the area and flung corrugated galvanized iron sheets in the air.
- August 18, 2024 – An EF1 tornado struck Surallah, South Cotabato where it partially damaged a total of 54 houses and 27 hectares of agricultural crops.
- August 19, 2024 – A tornado struck Malasiqui, Pangasinan where it damaged six houses and uprooted trees in the area. Meanwhile, another tornado struck Candaba, Pampanga where it blew away roofs of houses and also toppled several trees.
- August 23, 2024 – An EF1 tornado struck Norala, South Cotabato at around 16:00 PhST where it damaged multiple houses and toppled trees.
- September 18, 2024 – An EF2 tornado struck four villages in Cabatuan, Iloilo where it damaged a total of 44 houses, seven of which were destroyed. It also damaged several agricultural crops and a school building. Total costs of the damages caused by the tornado reached an estimate of up to ₱2 million. Meanwhile, another EF1 tornado struck Bataraza, Palawan where it damaged a total of ten houses.
- September 25, 2024 – A rain-wrapped EF1 wedge tornado struck La Castellana, Negros Occidental where it damaged a total of 16 houses and snapped nearby trees.
- September 26, 2024 – A tornado struck Arayat, Pampanga where it damaged the roof of a nearby house.
- September 27, 2024 – A tornado struck two villages in San Juan, Batangas where it damaged several structures, including a public market. It injured two people from a vehicular accident caused by the tornado.
- October 5, 2024 – An anticyclonic EF0 tornado hit Candelaria, Quezon where it stayed on the ground for around four minutes and destroyed five houses.
- November 17, 2024 – An EF1 tornado spawned by Typhoon Man-yi (Pepito) struck the towns of Pamplona and Aparri in the province of Cagayan at around 11:30 PhST. It damaged 12 houses and a chapel in the area.
- December 13, 2024 – An EF1 tornado tore through a market in Tanauan, Batangas and injured several people.
- December 15, 2024 – An EFU tornado damaged a portion of a carnival in Kalibo, Aklan.
- December 26, 2024 – An EF1 tornado struck Palimbang, Sultan Kudarat where it destroyed almost 30 houses.

==== 2025 ====
- February 13, 2025 – An EFU tornado struck Cortes, Surigao del Sur at around 01:00 PhST where it damaged a total of 56 houses, one of which were completely destroyed.
- March 6, 2025 – An EF1 tornado struck Murcia, Negros Occidental at around 14:00 PhST where it damaged the roof of a warehouse and other nearby structures. It also hit the Negros Power's Bacolod-Alijis 69 kV sub-transmission line which caused a power outage in the town and a nearby village in Bacolod. Debris were scattered and tree branches were carried as the tornado swept the town. Meanwhile, another EF1 tornado struck three villages in San Miguel, Bulacan at around 16:00 PhST where it damaged a total of 16 houses, one of which was completely destroyed.
- March 22, 2025 – A tornado struck the towns of Datu Salibo and Shariff Saydona Mustapha in Maguindanao del Sur where it damaged several houses.
- April 22, 2025 – An EF1 tornado struck five houses in Pikit, Cotabato where it damaged five houses.
- April 29, 2025 – An EF1 tornado ripped apart a portion of a hotel's entrance ceiling in Mandurriao district in Iloilo City and damaged four vehicles. It also injured a food delivery rider. Meanwhile, another EF1 tornado struck Balindong, Lanao del Sur where it tore off roofs of multiple houses.
- May 8, 2025 – An EF1 tornado that originated as a waterspout struck San Jose de Buenavista, Antique where it damaged 11 houses and capsized two boats.
- May 11, 2025 – An EF1 tornado accompanied by floods struck Maragusan, Davao de Oro during a heavy rainfall. It damaged houses and snapped trees in the area.
- May 13, 2025 – An EF1 tornado struck Cauayan, Isabela where it caused almost ₱100,000 in damages.
- May 29, 2025 – An EF2 tornado struck five villages in Tupi, South Cotabato where it damaged 7 houses, toppled electrical posts, and uprooted trees. Two people were rushed to a nearby hospital while twelve others were treated for first-aid injuries. Almost ₱19 million worth of agricultural crops were also damaged.
- June 11, 2025 – An EF1 tornado swept through a basketball court in Abulug, Cagayan.
- June 14, 2025 – An EF1 tornado struck Sibutu, Tawi-Tawi where it scattered debris and carried a corrugated galvanized iron sheet.
- June 15, 2025 – An EF1 tornado struck Lambunao, Iloilo where it damaged around 95 houses.
- June 28, 2025 – An EF1 tornado struck Brooke's Point, Palawan at around 13:13 PhST where it damaged three houses.
- July 9, 2025 – An EF1 tornado swept through Laoag, Ilocos Norte. Meanwhile, another EF1 tornado struck Iba, Zambales where it toppled a house and snapped tree branches. In the same day, another tornado struck a village in Arayat, Pampanga where it partially damaged 2 houses and affecting 9 people.
- July 20, 2025 – An EF1 tornado struck Narra, Palawan at around 15:00 PhST where it damaged multiple houses and boats.
- July 23, 2025 – An EF0 tornado hit Oton, Iloilo where it damaged several houses.
- July 26, 2025 – An EF1 tornado struck Paoay, Ilocos Norte at around 16:30 PhST where it damaged a total of seven houses, a carinderia, and a gas station.
- July 28, 2025 – An EF1 tornado struck a village in Vigan, Ilocos Sur at around 01:00 PhST where it partially damaged 14 houses.
- July 29, 2025 – A tornado struck Pasuquin, Ilocos Norte at around 15:00 PhST where it destroyed three huts.
- July 30, 2025 – An EF1 tornado struck Laoag, Ilocos Norte where it damaged at least eleven houses, uprooted trees, and toppled power lines.
- July 31, 2025 – An EF1 tornado struck Cabangan, Zambales where it damaged several houses and toppled trees.
- August 12, 2025 – An EFU tornado was spotted in Magsaysay, Occidental Mindoro at around 13:00 PhST.
- August 21, 2025 – An EFU tornado swept through Lapu-Lapu City, Cebu.
- August 26, 2025 – An EF1 tornado struck Matalam, Cotabato where it damaged several houses and toppled nearby trees. Meanwhile, another EF1 tornado struck Siasi, Sulu where it damaged ten houses.
- August 28, 2025 – An EF1 tornado struck a village in Panay, Capiz where it damaged a total of ten houses, two of which were completely destroyed.

Tornadoes confirmed in Camarines Norte on September 14, 2025
Three tornadic supercells formed a total of four tornadoes that struck multiple towns in Camarines Norte, along with one potential non-supercell landspout. In Barangay Magang, an EF3 tornado damaged several structures, uprooted trees, and toppled electrical poles in the area. Two people were killed after being hit by a falling tree while two others were injured by flying debris. Another EF0 tornado struck Barangay Lag-on but no damages were reported. The event destroyed 10 houses and partially damaged 111 others in Barangay Magang and Barangay Bibirao.
EF#	Area	Casualties
EF3	Daet (Barangay Magang)	2 fatalities, 2 injured
EF0	Daet (Barangay Lag-on)	None
EF1	Talisay (Barangay Cahabaan) (Note: Based on radar signatures.)	None
EF1	Vinzons (Barangay Napilihan)	None
EF0	Basud (Barangay Mampili) (Note: Non-supercell landspout.)	None

Tornadoes spawned by Typhoon Ragasa on September 22–24, 2025
Multiple tornadoes were reported during Typhoon Ragasa (Nando), accompanied by monsoon winds. On September 22, an EF2 tornado struck three villages in Santa Maria, Ilocus Sur where it damaged 48 houses. On September 23, an EF1 tornado struck Baras, Rizal. A day later, three additional tornadoes hit Zambales and Bulacan. At 14:00 PhST, an EF1 tornado damaged 3 houses and toppled trees in Olongapo, Zambales. Meanwhile in Masinloc, at around 16:00 PhST, another tornado tore through a public market. At 16:45 PhST, a tornado in Meycauayan, Bulacan damaged 7 houses and scattered multiple debris. A person was injured after falling from a motorcycle due to strong winds.
EF#	Area	Province	Casualties
EF2	Santa Maria	Ilocos Sur	None
EF1	Baras	Rizal	None
EF1	Olongapo	Zambales	None
–	Masinloc	Zambales	None
–	Meycauayan	Bulacan	1 injured

- September 26, 2025 – Two tornadoes were spawned by Typhoon Bualoi (Opong). In Maripipi, Biliran a tornado struck five villages around 02:00 PhST. It destroyed multiple homes, killed three people, injured 12 others, and left one person missing while causing widespread power outages and isolating the area. in Baco, Oriental Mindoro, an EFU tornado tore off roofs of nearby houses.
- October 8, 2025 – A tornado struck Maitum, Sarangani where it toppled trees in the area.
- November 3, 2025 – An EFU tornado struck Escalante, Negros Occidental where it wrecked four houses.
- November 14, 2025 – An EF1 tornado swept through Catarman, Northern Samar where it damaged cars and scattered debris on a nearby parking lot.
- November 25, 2025 – Two tornadoes were spawned by Typhoon Koto (Verbena). In Labangan, Zamboanga del Sur, an EF1 tornado struck a village where at least 2 houses were damaged. In Tangalan, Aklan, an EF2 tornado tore off roofs of multiple houses and snapped nearby trees.
- November 29, 2025 – An EF1 tornado struck a village in Dumangas, Iloilo where it damaged three houses.
- December 7, 2025 – An EFU tornado spawned by Tropical Depression Wilma (2025) struck Mercedes, Camarines Norte where it tore off roofs of several houses.

==== 2026 ====
- January 2, 2026 – An EFU tornado was spotted in Vallehermoso, Negros Oriental.
- February 6, 2026 – An EFU tornado spawned by Tropical Storm Penha (Basyang) struck Panglao, Bohol at around 14:00 PhST where it damaged a sari-sari store and toppled multiple trees.
- February 8, 2026 – An EFU tornado struck Tanauan, Leyte where it toppled several lamp posts and scattered debris.
- February 9, 2026 – An EFU tornado that originated as a waterspout struck Taraka, Lanao del Sur where it damaged 15 houses and a covered court of Mindanao State University Taraka Community High School.
- February 25, 2026 – A tornado struck Buenavista, Agusan del Norte where it toppled trees in the area.
- March 27, 2026 – A tornado was spotted in Malaybalay City, Bukidnon at around 15:00 PhST. No damages or casualties were reported.
- April 21, 2026 – A tornado struck Valderrama, Antique at around 09:30 PhST where it partially damaged two houses.
- April 22, 2026 – A tornado struck Bacolod, Negros Occidental where it swept a house, damaged its roof and windows.
- May 16, 2026 – A tornado struck San Manuel, Pangasinan amid localized thunderstorms across the country. It destroyed two houses and partially damaged 14 others.
- May 18, 2026 – A tornado struck Mina, Iloilo at around 14:30 PhST where it wrecked a nearby house.
- May 29, 2026 – A tornado influenced by Severe Tropical Storm Jangmi (Domeng) struck Infanta, Quezon where it damaged several houses and boats.
- June 13, 2026 – A tornado struck Cauayan, Isabela where it swept through houses, with one that had its roofs blown away.
- June 16, 2026 – A waterspout moved ashore on a coastal village in Davao City at around 22:00 PhST and partially damaged four houses.
- June 19, 2026 – A tornado was spotted in La Castellana, Negros Occidental at around 13:00 PhST. No major damages were reported. Meanwhile, at around 14:00 PhST, another tornado was spotted on top of a hill in Claveria, Misamis Oriental where it was seen hurling branches of trees and stripping its leaves.
- June 21, 2026 – A tornado was spotted in Malabon City.
- June 26, 2026 – A tornado struck Palo, Leyte at around 13:00 PhST where it damaged several structures, including a furniture store, and toppled trees and electrical posts.
- July 6, 2026 – A tornado struck Polomolok, South Cotabato where it damaged several houses and uprooted coconut trees.
- July 7, 2026 – A tornado struck a village in San Miguel, Bulacan where it swept through houses. No casualties were reported.
- July 9, 2026 – A tornado struck three villages in Hinigaran, Negros Occidental at around 06:45 PhST where it partially damaged at least 20 houses. No injuries were reported.
- July 11, 2026 – A tornado triggered by Typhoon Bavi (Inday) hit Nabas, Aklan where it blew away roofing sheets. No injuries were reported.
- July 12, 2026 – A tornado triggered by Typhoon Bavi (Inday) struck Santa Cruz, Occidental Mindoro where it toppled several trees in the area and swept through several houses. A total of 17 houses and two chicken farms were damaged, and one person was reported injured.
- July 16, 2026 – A tornado that originated as a waterspout struck a village in Masbate City where it destroyed a house and damaged two others.
- July 21, 2026 – A tornado struck Sibalom, Antique at around 15:30 PhST where it damaged roofs of several houses, toppled a tree, and disrupted power lines.
- July 27, 2026 – A tornado was spotted in Cabusao, Camarines Sur at around 15:00 PhST. No damages were reported.
- July 28, 2026 – A tornado struck Dagupan, Pangasinan where it uprooted a tree and damaged several houses, with one having its roof torn off. Meanwhile another tornado struck Goa, Camarines Sur at 13:00 PhST where it toppled a wooden shed and snapped branches of a tree.
- July 30, 2026 – A tornado was spotted in San Enrique, Iloilo. No damages were reported.
- August 8, 2026 – An IF2 tornado struck twelve villages in Iloilo City, Iloilo at around 22:30 PhST. A total of 101 houses were reportedly damaged, four of which were destroyed, affecting 148 families. Roadside ukay-ukay stalls were destroyed and food-vendor equipment scattered, trees were uprooted, and utility poles were toppled, including one that was snapped. A female student was injured after she was hit by a fallen tree at Jaro Plaza while watching over a tricycle. PAGASA did not verify the event, although the CDRRMO classified it as a "micro-tornado."
- August 9, 2026 – A tornado swept through Tondo, Manila where it toppled two motorcycles. In Santa Cruz, two homes were unroofed and a car was struck by a toppled mango tree. A two-story home also suffered heavy damage, and completely collapsed almost a month later.
- August 13, 2026 – A suspected tornado struck a village in San Vicente, Palawan around 19:00 PhST, damaging multiple houses including a newly built home. No casualties were reported.
- August 22, 2026 – A waterspout moved ashore on a village in Donsol, Sorsogon at around 09:00 PhST where it damaged up to 15 houses. No casualties were reported.

Confirmed tornadoes in Ilocos Sur on August 30–September 1, 2026
A small tornado outbreak occurred across Ilocos Sur amid the enhanced southwest monsoon that affected parts of the country. On August 30, a tornado struck two villages in Burgos where it damaged at least 10 houses. On August 31, a waterspout made landfall in Narvacan where it blew away several beach cottages and knocked over a street light, causing up to ₱500,000 in damages. One person was reported injured. In Magsingal, a waterspout was captured by residents. Several villages in Bantay were also hit by a tornado, as it blew away roofs and toppled trees. In the afternoon hours, a strong tornado swept through Cabugao. It was seen travelling through the residential area, ripping away roofs of several houses and a building from a school. Trees and electrical poles were toppled, causing a widespread power outage. No injuries were reported. Minutes later, another tornado was observed in Sinait as it tore parts of the roof of houses and snapped tree branches. On the early morning hours of September 1, a tornado struck three villages in Santa Catalina where it flipped a utility vehicle, and caused damages to several houses. At around the same time, another tornado struck San Vicente where it damaged houses and scattered debris. A tornado also formed in Santo Domingo where it snapped tree branches and tore parts of roofs. A few hours later, a tornado touched down on a farm in Caoayan. No major damages were reported. Combined, the outbreak affected a total of 5,026 families across 168 villages in two cities and 16 municipalities. Initial assessments confirmed at least 60 houses damaged.
EF#	Area	Casualties
–	Burgos	None
–	Narvacan	1 injured
–	Magsingal	None
–	Bantay	None
–	Cabugao	None
–	Sinait	None
–	Santa Catalina	None
–	San Vicente	None
–	Santo Domingo	None
–	Caoayan	None

- September 13, 2026 – A tornado struck a village in Rosario, Batangas, where it severely damaged nine houses. No casualties were reported.
- October 2, 2026 – A tornado struck a village in Cabanatuan City, Nueva Ecija where it damage 39 houses. No casualties were reported.

== Tornado records ==
Deadliest Philippine tornadoes
Rank	Areas	F/EF	Date	Fatalities	References
1	Manukan, Zamboanga del Norte	F2	June 12, 1990	51	
2	San Ricardo, Southern Leyte	F2	December 19, 2003	50	
3	Datu Piang, Maguindanao del Sur	F1	November 26, 1994	14	
–	Valencia, Bukidnon	–	September 29, 1995	14	(Note: The tornado triggered a landslide which led to fatalities.)
–	Caibiran, Biliran	–	December 16, 2017	14	(Note: Spawned by Tropical Storm Kai-tak (2017). The tornado triggered a landslide which led to fatalities.)
6	Malita, Davao del Sur	F1	June 3, 1989	13	
7	Macabebe–Masantol, Pampanga	F1	June 13, 1968	12	
–	Roxas, Oriental Mindoro	–	November 20, 2004	12	(Note: Spawned by Typhoon Muifa (2004).)
–	Liguasan Marsh	–	March 25, 2013	12	(Note: The tornado caused an overloaded boat to capsize, which led to drowning fatalities.)
10	Cagayan de Oro, Misamis Oriental	–	October 23, 1988	10	(Note: Spawned by Typhoon Ruby (1988).)

== See also ==
- List of Asian tornadoes and tornado outbreaks
- List of tornadoes striking downtown areas of large cities
- List of tropical cyclones spawning tornadoes
- Typhoons in the Philippines
