= 1990 Manukan tornado =

1990 Philippine tornado

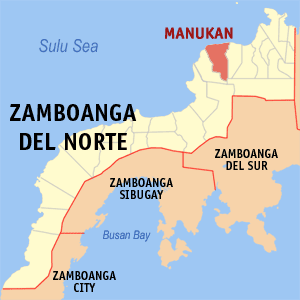
- Location of Manukan in Zamboanga del Norte, where the tornado struck

Meteorological history
- Date: June 12, 1990
- Formed: 7:00 p.m. PHT (11:00 UTC)

EF2 tornado
- on the Enhanced Fujita scale

Overall effects
- Fatalities: 51
- Injuries: >100
- Damage: ₱40 million ($1.7 million USD)
- Areas affected: Upper Disakan, Manukan, Zamboanga del Norte
- Houses destroyed: 154
- Part of tornadoes of 1990

On the evening of Tuesday, June 12, 1990, a deadly nocturnal tornado struck the coastal town of Manukan in the Philippines. More than a hundred homes were damaged or destroyed; and was estimated to have a potential EF2 intensity on the Enhanced Fujita scale (EF-scale) by the Severe Weather Archive of the Philippines. It is considered to be the deadliest tornado in Philippine history with a total of 51 people killed.

== Background ==
Approximately 12 to 24 tornadoes hit the Philippines every year. One of the main tornado hotspots in the country is located in the Central Mindanao region, with heavy concentration in Cotabato. The area is surrounded between the Tiruray Highlands in the west and the Pantaron Mountain Range in the east which influences atmospheric instability through orographic effect. Additionally, the Cotabato Basin is known for its flat terrain—making it susceptible for tornadoes. Occasionally, some tornadoes occurred outside this region; a few of those were notably destructive, including an estimated EF2 tornado that formed in Lantapan, Bukidnon on July 2, 1991.

Tornadic activity in Mindanao primarily begins in April and ends in November, with peak activity in June. These months coincide with the shifting of the Intertropical Convergence Zone (ITCZ) and transition periods between monsoons, which provided the necessary atmospheric conditions for severe weather events to develop.

== Tornado summary and aftermath ==
At 7:00 p.m. PHT (11:00 UTC), a tornado formed on the village of Upper Disakan in Manukan, Zamboanga del Norte, around 50 km (31 mi) away from the nearby town of Dipolog. It reportedly went ashore and flattened homes in the area, most of which were made from coconut leaves, and carried people, plants, and animals into the sea. A report from the Department of Social Welfare and Development and the Philippine National Red Cross stated that the tornado destroyed a total of 154 houses and rendered 536 people homeless.

Initial estimates from the tornado two days later tallied around 30 people killed and 50 others injured. At the time, the Philippine National Red Cross and other relief agencies in Manila said that they have not received a report of said tornado in the area, but rather unconfirmed details of heavy flooding. On June 15, the following day, relief assistance began and a joint report from the Department of Social Welfare and Development and the Philippine National Red Cross confirmed 24 deaths, eight of whom were children that were recovered from the sea, and 43 others missing and presumed dead. The National Route 79 highway, the main road that goes through the town of Manukan was deemed impassable. On June 16, the death toll climbed up to 36 with 44 others remained missing. An estimated total number of people injured also reached more than a hundred. The aftermath of the event was further worsened by continuous heavy rainfalls, strong winds, and flash floods in the area which hindered relief efforts. A later count concluded a total of 51 people killed from the tornado.

On June 21, more than a week after the tornado struck the town, then President Corazon Aquino issued Proclamation No. 591, which declared a state of public calamity in the province of Zamboanga del Norte. Heavy damages and destruction to private properties, infrastructures, and agricultural crops amounted to around ₱40 million (US$1.7 million). Relief operations and rehabilitation works were implemented as recommended by then Defense Secretary Fidel Ramos.

== Non-tornadic effects ==
Heavy rainfall in Zamboanga del Norte resulted in floods that partially damaged houses, roads, and bridges in Bacungan, Manukan, and Zamboanga City. Government authorities in the area reported at least 12 deaths and 86 people rendered missing. It also led to the declaration of a state of public calamity in the province.

== See also ==
- Daulatpur–Saturia tornado – The deadliest tornado in history, occurred in Manikganj District, Bangladesh in April 1989.
- List of Asian tornadoes and tornado outbreaks
- List of Philippine tornadoes
