= 1953 Philippine House of Representatives elections =

10th Philippine House of Representatives elections

- November 10, 1953

All 102 seats in the House of Representatives of the Philippines 52 seats needed for a majority
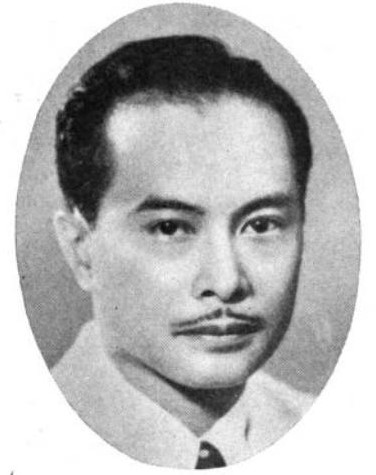

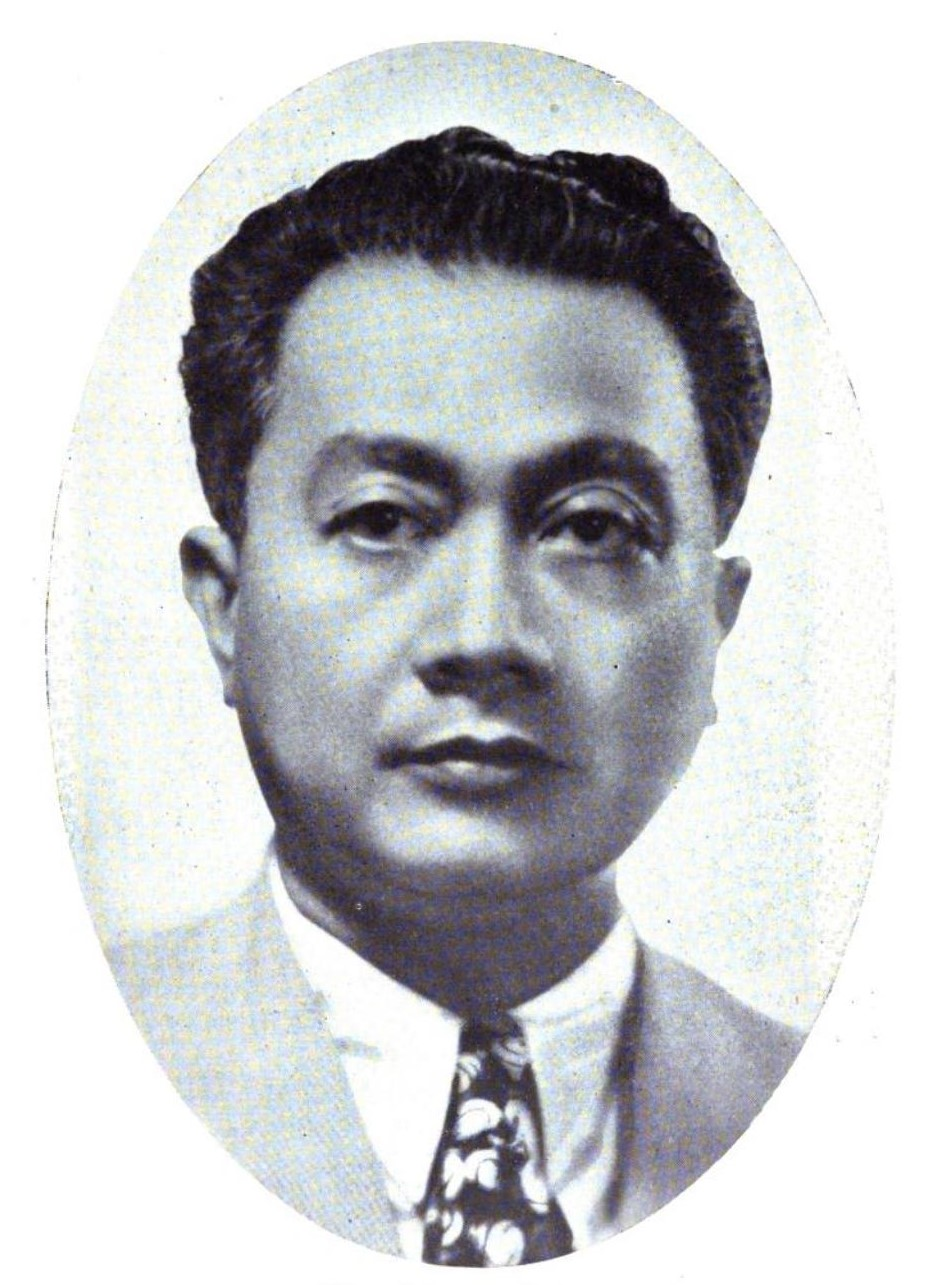

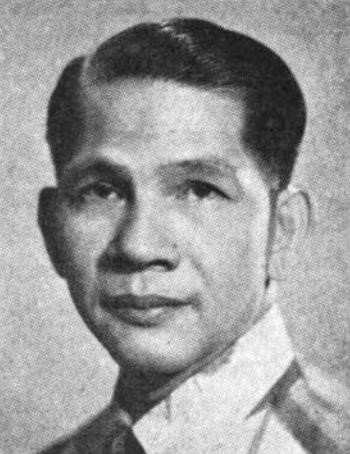
	First party	Second party	Third party
Leader	Jose Laurel Jr.	Eugenio Pérez	Jose Roy
Party	Nacionalista	Liberal	Democratic
Leader's seat	Batangas–3rd	Pangasinan–2nd	Tarlac–1st
Last election	33 seats, 34.05%	60 seats, 53%	Party does not exist
Seats won	59	31	9
Seat change	▲26	▼29	▲9
Popular vote	1,930,367	1,624,571	284,222
Percentage	47.30	39.81	6.96
Swing	▲13.25	▼24.32	▲6.85
Speaker before election
Eugenio Pérez
Liberal
Elected Speaker
Jose Laurel Jr.
Nacionalista

Elections for the House of Representatives of the Philippines were held on November 10, 1953. Held on the same day as the presidential election, the party of the incumbent president, Elpidio Quirino's Liberal Party, won majority of the seats in the House of Representatives. However, Ramon Magsaysay of the opposition Nacionalista Party was elected president, and several elected Liberal Party congressmen defected to the Nacionalista Party, leading to José Laurel, Jr. being elected Speaker of the House of Representatives.

The elected representatives served in the 3rd Congress from 1953 to 1957.

== Electoral system ==
The House of Representatives has at most 120 seats, 102 seats for this election, all voted via first-past-the-post in single-member districts. Each province is guaranteed at least one congressional district, with more populous provinces divided into two or more districts.

Congress has the power of redistricting three years after each census.

== Results ==
Party	Votes	%	±	Seats	±
Nacionalista Party	1,930,367	47.30	+13.25	59	+26
Liberal Party	1,624,571	39.81	−24.32	31	−29
Democratic Party	284,222	6.96	+6.85	9	New
Democratic Party/Nacionalista Party	58,667	1.44	New	2	New
Nacionalista Party (independent)	42,081	1.03	New	0	0
Liberal Party (independent)	25,927	0.64	New	0	0
People's Party	3,155	0.08	New	0	0
New Young Philippines	620	0.02	New	0	0
Republican Party	431	0.01	New	0	0
Independent	111,160	2.72	+1.30	1	0
Total	4,081,201	100.00	–	102	+2
Valid votes	4,081,201	94.33	−2.35		
Invalid/blank votes	245,495	5.67	+2.35		
Total votes	4,326,696	100.00	–		
Registered voters/turnout	5,603,231	77.22	+9.83		
Source: Nohlen, Grotz and Hartmann and Teehankee

Vote share
Nacionalista	47.30%
Liberal	39.81%
Democratic	8.40%
Others	4.50%

Seats
Nacionalista	57.84%
Liberal	30.39%
Democratic	10.78%
Others	0.98%

=== Results by district ===
Representative district	Candidate	Party	Votes	%
Abra's lone	Lucas Paredes	Liberal	16,895	71.87
Abra's lone	Marcelino Sayo	Nacionalista	6,610	28.12
Abra's lone	Virgilio Valera (incumbent)	Liberal (Independent)	1	0.00
Abra's lone	Agripino Brillantes	Liberal	1	0.00
Abra's lone	Crisostomo Pariñas	Independent	0	0.00
Agusan's lone	Guillermo Sanchez	Nacionalista	24,467	56.57
Agusan's lone	Marcos Calo (incumbent)	Liberal	18,784	43.43
Agusan's lone	Francisco Cupin	Democratic	0	0.00
Albay's 1st	Lorenzo Ziga (incumbent)	Liberal	13,091	51.87
Albay's 1st	Antonio Bellen	Nacionalista	12,127	48.05
Albay's 1st	Apolonio Belen	Independent	14	0.06
Albay's 1st	Efren Borras	Liberal	4	0.02
Albay's 1st	Salvador Balane	Democratic	0	0.00
Albay's 2nd	Justino Nuyda (incumbent)	Nacionalista	10,141	44.84
Albay's 2nd	Toribio Perez	Liberal	8,134	35.96
Albay's 2nd	Honesto de Vera	Nacionalista	3,271	14.46
Albay's 2nd	Gregorio Sabater	Liberal (Independent)	1,069	4.73
Albay's 2nd	Jose Crisol	Independent	3	0.01
Albay's 2nd	Antonio Azaña	Nacionalista	0	0.00
Albay's 3rd	Pio Duran (incumbent)	Nacionalista	9,809	33.39
Albay's 3rd	Marcial Rañola	Liberal	9,068	30.87
Albay's 3rd	Florentino Jaucian	Liberal	6,579	22.40
Albay's 3rd	Jose Santiago Sarte	Liberal	3,918	13.34
Albay's 3rd	Luis Samarista	Independent	1	0.00
Antique's lone	Tobias Fornier (incumbent)	Nacionalista	20,701	58.42
Antique's lone	Emigdio Nietes	Liberal	14,733	41.58
Bataan's lone	Jose Nuguid	Nacionalista	15,410	45.92
Bataan's lone	Medina Lacson de Leon (incumbent)	Liberal	10,874	32.40
Bataan's lone	Gabriel Pascual	Democratic	7,274	21.68
Batanes' lone	Jorge Abad (incumbent)	Liberal	1,681	53.38
Batanes' lone	Custodio Villalva	Nacionalista	1,328	42.17
Batanes' lone	Jose Javier	Liberal	89	2.83
Batanes' lone	Calixto Villarta Gasilao	Nacionalista	51	1.62
Batangas' 1st	Apolinario Apacible (incumbent)	Nacionalista	14,290	38.67
Batangas' 1st	Jose Huerto	Independent	10,436	28.24
Batangas' 1st	Miguel Tolentino	Liberal	9,618	26.02
Batangas' 1st	Marcelino Enriquez	Nacionalista (Independent)	2,614	7.07
Batangas' 2nd	Numeriano Babao (incumbent)	Nacionalista	25,069	53.95
Batangas' 2nd	Jose Contreras	Liberal	18,382	39.56
Batangas' 2nd	Jesus Montalbo	Nacionalista	1,679	3.61
Batangas' 2nd	Telesforo Capio	Democratic	1,333	2.87
Batangas' 3rd	Jose Laurel Jr. (incumbent)	Nacionalista	36,779	83.81
Batangas' 3rd	Donato Guevara	Liberal	7,103	16.19
Bohol's 1st	Natalio Castillo	Nacionalista	13,764	50.03
Bohol's 1st	Luis Clarin (incumbent)	Liberal	13,726	49.89
Bohol's 1st	Zacarias Castillo	Nacionalista	24	0.09
Bohol's 1st	Ramon Palacio	Independent	0	0.00
Bohol's 2nd	Bartolome Cabangbang	Nacionalista	13,764	50.03
Bohol's 2nd	Margarito Añana	Liberal	13,726	49.89
Bohol's 2nd	Pablo Malasarte	Independent	24	0.09
Bohol's 2nd	Macario Falcon	Democratic	0	0.00
Bohol's 3rd	Esteban Bernido (incumbent)	Nacionalista	23,290	59.74
Bohol's 3rd	Diosdado Reyes Delima	Liberal	15,695	40.26
Bukidnon's lone	Cesar Fortich (incumbent)	Nacionalista	6,804	49.39
Bukidnon's lone	Pedro Melendez	Liberal	3,707	26.91
Bukidnon's lone	Andres Arche	Nacionalista	3,264	23.70
Bulacan's 1st	Erasmo Cruz (incumbent)	Nacionalista	37,060	54.43
Bulacan's 1st	Federico Suntay	Liberal	31,026	45.57
Bulacan's 2nd	Rogaciano Mercado	Nacionalista	29,918	43.34
Bulacan's 2nd	Antonio Villarama	Liberal	29,867	43.27
Bulacan's 2nd	Feliberto Castillo	Democratic	9,243	13.39
Cagayan's 1st	Felipe Garduque	Nacionalista	11,471	32.32
Cagayan's 1st	Marcelo Adduru	Liberal	11,400	32.12
Cagayan's 1st	Jose Abalos	Liberal	8,558	24.11
Cagayan's 1st	Domingo Siazon (incumbent)	Nacionalista–Democratic	4,027	11.35
Cagayan's 1st	Conrado Singson	Nacionalista	36	0.10
Cagayan's 2nd	Paulino Alonzo (incumbent)	Liberal	6,787	27.60
Cagayan's 2nd	Juan Alonzo	Nacionalista	6,390	25.98
Cagayan's 2nd	Benjamin Ligot	Nacionalista	5,590	22.73
Cagayan's 2nd	Juan Baligod	Liberal	4,270	17.36
Cagayan's 2nd	Roberto Avena	Nacionalista–Democratic	1,558	6.33
Camarines Norte's lone	Fernando Pajarillo	Nacionalista	15,764	48.73
Camarines Norte's lone	Esmeraldo Eco (incumbent)	Young Philippines–Liberal	11,727	36.25
Camarines Norte's lone	Pedro Venida	Liberal (Independent)	4,632	14.32
Camarines Norte's lone	Fernando Gaite	Democratic	229	0.71
Camarines Sur's 1st	Emilio Tible (incumbent)	Nacionalista	16,892	37.82
Camarines Sur's 1st	Victorino Ojeda	Nacionalista	13,929	31.19
Camarines Sur's 1st	Leon Aureus	Liberal	7,375	16.51
Camarines Sur's 1st	Juan Miranda	Liberal (Independent)	6,468	14.48
Camarines Sur's 1st	Rustico Pasilaban	Democratic	0	0.00
Camarines Sur's 2nd	Felix Fuentebella	Nacionalista	24,684	44.84
Camarines Sur's 2nd	Sebastian Moll Jr.	Liberal	24,485	44.48
Camarines Sur's 2nd	Cosme Gonowon	Nacionalista	5,883	10.69
Camarines Sur's 2nd	Felix Madera	Liberal (Independent)	1	0.00
Capiz' 1st	Carmen Consing	Nacionalista	20,469	54.06
Capiz' 1st	Ramon Arnaldo (incumbent)	Liberal	17,392	45.94
Capiz' 2nd	Cornelio Villareal (incumbent)	Liberal	14,756	57.57
Capiz' 2nd	Antonio Beldia	Nacionalista	10,876	42.43
Capiz' 2nd	Jose Dorado	Democratic	0	0.00
Capiz' 2nd	Jose Torres	Democratic	0	0.00
Capiz' 3rd	Godofredo Ramos (incumbent)	Nacionalista	14,184	50.19
Capiz' 3rd	Juan Pastrana	Liberal	14,074	49.81
Catanduanes' lone	Francisco Perfecto	Nacionalista	9,339	38.46
Catanduanes' lone	Severiano de Leon (incumbent)	Liberal	6,952	28.63
Catanduanes' lone	Gabriel Torrecampo	Nacionalista	5,324	21.92
Catanduanes' lone	Alfredo Talion	Liberal	2,669	10.99
Cavite's lone	Jose Cajulis	Nacionalista	31,932	49.04
Cavite's lone	Manuel Rojas	Liberal	29,564	45.40
Cavite's lone	Baldomero Luque	Independent	3,621	5.56
Cebu's 1st	Ramon Durano (incumbent)	Nacionalista–Democratic	13,083	40.53
Cebu's 1st	Florencio Urot	Liberal	12,214	37.84
Cebu's 1st	Celestino Paulin	Nacionalista	4,565	14.14
Cebu's 1st	Antonio Mansueto	Nacionalista	2,415	7.48
Cebu's 1st	Maximiano Rodrigo	Nacionalista–Democratic	1	0.00
Cebu's 1st	Agustin Sepulveda	Liberal (Independent)	1	0.00
Cebu's 1st	Jose Manulat	Independent	0	0.00
Cebu's 1st	Medardo Martinez	Independent	0	0.00
Cebu's 1st	Ricardo Reyes	Nacionalista–Democratic	0	0.00
Cebu's 1st	Francisco Arnado	Nacionalista–Democratic	0	0.00
Cebu's 2nd	Pedro Lopez	Independent	19,090	32.89
Cebu's 2nd	Jose Briones	Nacionalista	18,938	32.63
Cebu's 2nd	Vicente Logarta (incumbent)	Nacionalista	16,278	28.05
Cebu's 2nd	Andres Camasura	Nacionalista	2,727	4.70
Cebu's 2nd	Eufrosino Ramos	Independent	1,004	1.73
Cebu's 3rd	Maximino Noel (incumbent)	Nacionalista	10,114	49.28
Cebu's 3rd	Edilberto Osmeña	Liberal	6,519	31.77
Cebu's 3rd	Reynaldo Mendiola	Nacionalista	3,178	15.49
Cebu's 3rd	Mariano Florido	Democratic	711	3.46
Cebu's 4th	Isidro Kintanar	Nacionalista	5,284	38.61
Cebu's 4th	Cesar Kintanar	Liberal	4,513	32.98
Cebu's 4th	Juan Alcazaren	Nacionalista	2,243	16.39
Cebu's 4th	Mario Ortiz	Democratic	1,473	10.76
Cebu's 4th	Jesus Villahermosa	Nacionalista (Independent)	171	1.25
Cebu's 5th	Miguel Cuenco (incumbent)	Nacionalista	11,391	51.50
Cebu's 5th	Domiciano Lambo	Liberal	10,206	46.14
Cebu's 5th	Robustiano Dejaresco	Independent	419	1.89
Cebu's 5th	Restituto Gorrero	Nacionalista	103	0.47
Cebu's 6th	Santiago Lucero	Liberal	5,819	29.76
Cebu's 6th	Manuel Zosa (incumbent)	Nacionalista–Democratic	5,785	29.58
Cebu's 6th	Jesus Garcia	Nacionalista (Independent)	4,664	23.85
Cebu's 6th	Emilio Lumontad	Nacionalista	3,287	16.81
Cebu's 7th	Nicolas Escario (incumbent)	Liberal	15,431	49.97
Cebu's 7th	Antonio de Pio	Nacionalista	11,278	36.52
Cebu's 7th	Santos Migallos	Independent	4,172	13.51
Cebu's 7th	Juanito Maramara	Democratic	0	0.00
Cotabato's lone	Luminog Mangelen	Liberal	20,026	26.48
Cotabato's lone	Mando Sinsuat	Liberal	18,500	24.46
Cotabato's lone	Aguedo Gepte	Independent	13,842	18.30
Cotabato's lone	Blah Sinsuat (incumbent)	Nacionalista	13,617	18.00
Cotabato's lone	Juan Depra	Democratic	7,559	9.99
Cotabato's lone	Pedro Morales	Independent	1,890	2.50
Cotabato's lone	Pelagio Oracion	Independent	198	0.26
Davao's lone	Ismael Veloso (incumbent)	Nacionalista	43,646	50.09
Davao's lone	Emigdio Dakanay	Nacionalista	14,751	16.93
Davao's lone	Antonio Pichon Jr.	Liberal	13,536	15.53
Davao's lone	Bernardo Teves	Nacionalista–Democratic	10,005	11.48
Davao's lone	Ricardo Miranda	Nacionalista (Independent)	5,205	5.97
Ilocos Norte's 1st	Antonio Raquiza (incumbent)	Liberal	15,089	49.25
Ilocos Norte's 1st	Gabriel Jesus Ruiz	Nacionalista	9,145	29.85
Ilocos Norte's 1st	Felix Domingo	Democratic	6,403	20.90
Ilocos Norte's 1st	Leocadio Adriano	Independent	1	0.00
Ilocos Norte's 1st	Felipa Ruiz	Liberal (Independent)	1	0.00
Ilocos Norte's 2nd	Ferdinand Marcos (incumbent)	Liberal	17,503	62.78
Ilocos Norte's 2nd	Eliodoro Segui	Nacionalista	6,125	21.97
Ilocos Norte's 2nd	Pedro Albano	Democratic	4,254	15.26
Ilocos Sur's 1st	Floro Crisologo (incumbent)	Liberal	19,880	57.58
Ilocos Sur's 1st	Faustino Tobia	Nacionalista	13,663	39.58
Ilocos Sur's 1st	Santiago Sambrano	Liberal	980	2.84
Ilocos Sur's 1st	Filadelpo Rojas	Independent	1	0.00
Ilocos Sur's 2nd	Ricardo Gacula (incumbent)	Liberal	23,842	61.01
Ilocos Sur's 2nd	Manuel Villanueva	Liberal	12,532	32.07
Ilocos Sur's 2nd	Isabelo Pacquing	Liberal	2,672	6.84
Ilocos Sur's 2nd	Samson Blankas	Liberal	29	0.07
Ilocos Sur's 2nd	Eloy Bello	Nacionalista	4	0.01
Ilocos Sur's 2nd	Prospero Sanidad	Liberal	1	0.00
Ilocos Sur's 2nd	Jovencio Reyes	Liberal	0	0.00
Ilocos Sur's 2nd	Miguel Pagaduan	Independent	0	0.00
Ilocos Sur's 2nd	Antonio Directo	Nacionalista	0	0.00
Ilocos Sur's 2nd	Serapio Calip	Democratic	0	0.00
Iloilo's 1st	Pedro Trono	Democratic	12,305	38.72
Iloilo's 1st	Mario Guariña	Nacionalista	11,904	37.45
Iloilo's 1st	Mateo Nonato	Liberal	7,574	23.83
Iloilo's 2nd	Rodolfo Ganzon	Nacionalista	24,675	58.22
Iloilo's 2nd	Pascual Espinosa (incumbent)	Liberal	16,054	37.88
Iloilo's 2nd	Evelio Zaldivar	Democratic	1,653	3.90
Iloilo's 3rd	Ramon Tabiana	Liberal	18,628	50.11
Iloilo's 3rd	Domitilo Abordo	Democratic	11,239	30.23
Iloilo's 3rd	Patricio Confesor (incumbent)	Nacionalista	7,306	19.65
Iloilo's 4th	Ricardo Ladrido (incumbent)	Democratic	14,127	47.52
Iloilo's 4th	Hilarion Benedicto	Nacionalista	7,379	24.82
Iloilo's 4th	Fortunato Camarista	Liberal	6,057	20.37
Iloilo's 4th	Gaudencio Demaisip	Liberal	2,166	7.29
Iloilo's 4th	Jose Divinagracia	Nacionalista	2	0.01
Iloilo's 4th	Benigno Labrador	Independent	0	0.00
Iloilo's 5th	Jose Aldeguer (incumbent)	Democratic	19,727	59.12
Iloilo's 5th	Tomas Vargas	Liberal	7,654	22.94
Iloilo's 5th	Manuel Pama	Nacionalista	3,104	9.30
Iloilo's 5th	Luis Dator	Nacionalista	2,885	8.65
Isabela's lone	Samuel Reyes (incumbent)	Liberal	18,838	32.55
Isabela's lone	Delfin Albano	Liberal	18,773	32.44
Isabela's lone	Mauro Verzosa	Nacionalista	7,030	12.15
Isabela's lone	Ruben Bañez	Nacionalista	6,422	11.10
Isabela's lone	Francisco Ramirez Sr.	Nacionalista	2,424	4.19
Isabela's lone	Tranquilino Madamba	Democratic	1,220	2.11
Isabela's lone	Dominador Macaranas	Democratic	1,186	2.05
Isabela's lone	Purificacion Dasalla	Independent	947	1.64
Isabela's lone	Ricardo Binag	Independent	720	1.24
Isabela's lone	Quintin Alcid	Liberal (Independent)	258	0.45
Isabela's lone	Cesar Mata	Democratic	50	0.09
La Union's 1st	Francisco Ortega	Liberal	10,893	40.12
La Union's 1st	Fernando Zambrano	Liberal	8,206	30.22
La Union's 1st	Narciso Aquino	Nacionalista	3,585	13.20
La Union's 1st	Venancio Nera	Liberal	2,682	9.88
La Union's 1st	Saturnino Aricheta	Independent	1,078	3.97
La Union's 1st	Zoilo Alviar	Liberal	601	2.21
La Union's 1st	Alberto Munar	Nacionalista (Independent)	90	0.33
La Union's 1st	Dionisio Flores	Nacionalista	15	0.06
La Union's 1st	Isaac Eceta	Nacionalista	2	0.01
La Union's 1st	Tancredo Guray	Democratic	0	0.00
La Union's 1st	Miguel Rilloraza Jr. (incumbent)	Liberal	0	0.00
La Union's 2nd	Miguel Cases (incumbent)	Liberal	19,720	68.23
La Union's 2nd	Moises Villanueva	Nacionalista	9,180	31.76
La Union's 2nd	Froilan Maglaya	Democratic	1	0.00
Laguna's 1st	Jacobo Gonzales	Nacionalista	28,184	47.95
Laguna's 1st	Manuel Concordia (incumbent)	Liberal	17,469	29.72
Laguna's 1st	Carlos Galvez	Liberal	13,101	22.29
Laguna's 1st	Gregorio Gonzales	Independent	20	0.03
Laguna's 1st	Jose Dizon	Independent	1	0.00
Laguna's 2nd	Wenceslao Lagumbay	Nacionalista	22,247	53.50
Laguna's 2nd	Estanislao Fernandez (incumbent)	Liberal	19,025	45.75
Laguna's 2nd	Leon Cabalhin	Independent	310	0.75
Lanao's lone	Domocao Alonto	Nacionalista	44,063	49.82
Lanao's lone	Mohammad Ali Dimaporo (incumbent)	Liberal	42,096	47.60
Lanao's lone	Manuel Ramos	Liberal	917	1.04
Lanao's lone	Gonoroso Avendaño	Independent	860	0.97
Lanao's lone	Ruperto Romuros	Nacionalista	502	0.57
Lanao's lone	Camilo Cabili	Democratic	1	0.00
Leyte's 1st	Carlos Tan	Liberal	15,166	50.16
Leyte's 1st	Mateo Canonoy (incumbent)	Nacionalista	15,069	49.84
Leyte's 1st	Crispin Veloso	Nacionalista	2	0.01
Leyte's 1st	Manuel Nierras	Liberal	0	0.00
Leyte's 2nd	Domingo Veloso (incumbent)	Nacionalista–Democratic	18,121	50.80
Leyte's 2nd	Dominador Tan	Liberal	17,553	49.20
Leyte's 3rd	Francisco Pajao (incumbent)	Liberal	13,301	37.70
Leyte's 3rd	Nicanor Yñiguez	Nacionalista	12,060	34.18
Leyte's 3rd	Antonio Veloso	Nacionalista	7,643	21.66
Leyte's 3rd	Constancio Tan	Nacionalista	2,277	6.45
Leyte's 4th	Daniel Romualdez (incumbent)	Nacionalista	23,965	58.76
Leyte's 4th	Manuel Lagunzad	Liberal	16,766	41.11
Leyte's 4th	Galicano Tolibas	Independent	51	0.13
Leyte's 5th	Alberto Aguja	Nacionalista	15,195	46.31
Leyte's 5th	Atilano Cinco (incumbent)	Liberal	13,969	42.58
Leyte's 5th	Apolinario Lastrilla	Nacionalista	3,167	9.65
Leyte's 5th	Jose Santos	Democratic	478	1.46
Manila's 1st	Angel Castaño	Nacionalista	25,176	42.56
Manila's 1st	Engracio Clemeña (incumbent)	Nacionalista	16,159	27.32
Manila's 1st	Felicidad Manuel	Liberal	11,609	19.63
Manila's 1st	Leonardo Marquez	Democratic	5,829	9.85
Manila's 1st	Benigno Macam	Republican	155	0.26
Manila's 1st	Estanislao Salinas	Republican	135	0.23
Manila's 1st	Carlos Perfecto	Nacionalista	90	0.15
Manila's 2nd	Joaquin Roces	Nacionalista	27,864	74.39
Manila's 2nd	Jose T. Nueno	Liberal	5,596	14.94
Manila's 2nd	Alfonso Precilla	Democratic	2,256	6.02
Manila's 2nd	Jose Jimeno	New Young Philippines	620	1.66
Manila's 2nd	Pablo Manlapit	Independent	367	0.98
Manila's 2nd	Celestino Sagalongos	Nacionalista–Democratic	277	0.74
Manila's 2nd	Edilberto Conson	Independent	179	0.48
Manila's 2nd	Arturo Samaniego	Nacionalista	150	0.40
Manila's 2nd	Vicente Navarro	Republican	117	0.31
Manila's 2nd	Joaquin Yuseco	Nacionalista	33	0.09
Manila's 3rd	Arturo Tolentino (incumbent)	Nacionalista	44,294	72.44
Manila's 3rd	Eduardo Quintos	Liberal	16,839	27.54
Manila's 3rd	Francisco Gular	Republican	14	0.02
Manila's 4th	Augusto Francisco	Nacionalista	26,803	45.80
Manila's 4th	Emerito Ramos	Liberal	14,732	25.17
Manila's 4th	Alfredo Gomez	Democratic	4,624	7.90
Manila's 4th	Gavino Viola Fernando (incumbent)	Nacionalista	4,590	7.84
Manila's 4th	Justo Albert	Independent	4,516	7.72
Manila's 4th	Guillermo Salvador	Independent	3,041	5.20
Manila's 4th	Manuel Cruzal	Nacionalista (Independent)	119	0.20
Manila's 4th	Guillermo Ventura	Independent	89	0.15
Manila's 4th	Benjamin Beltran	Republican	10	0.02
Marinduque's lone	Panfilo Manguera (incumbent)	Nacionalista	8,606	43.81
Marinduque's lone	Ramon Reynoso	Nacionalista	5,959	30.34
Marinduque's lone	Timoteo Ricohermoso	Nacionalista	3,615	18.40
Marinduque's lone	Domingo Vitto	Nacionalista	1,102	5.61
Marinduque's lone	Teofisto Jamolin	Liberal	360	1.83
Masbate's lone	Mateo Pecson	Liberal	16,042	41.34
Masbate's lone	Efren Valencia	Nacionalista	14,101	36.34
Masbate's lone	Emilio Espinosa (incumbent)	Liberal	8,607	22.18
Masbate's lone	Isabelo Moran	Liberal	51	0.13
Misamis Occidental's lone	William Chiongbian	Liberal	18,243	44.53
Misamis Occidental's lone	Valeriano Kaamiño	Nacionalista	13,821	33.74
Misamis Occidental's lone	Diego Ty Deling	Nacionalista	7,157	17.47
Misamis Occidental's lone	L. O. Naranjo	Independent	1,554	3.79
Misamis Occidental's lone	Maximo Cadayona	Liberal (Independent)	191	0.47
Misamis Oriental's lone	Ignacio Cruz	Nacionalista	24,755	49.30
Misamis Oriental's lone	Ricardo Gabucan	Liberal	11,974	23.85
Misamis Oriental's lone	Rodrigo Lim	Nacionalista	7,002	13.95
Misamis Oriental's lone	Aquilino Pimentel	Independent	5,839	11.63
Misamis Oriental's lone	Amadeo Neri	Liberal	641	1.28
Mountain Province's 1st	Juan Bondad	Nacionalista	5,637	21.08
Mountain Province's 1st	Antonio Canao (incumbent)	Liberal	4,825	18.05
Mountain Province's 1st	Pio Marcos	Liberal (Independent)	3,760	14.06
Mountain Province's 1st	Benito Rafael	Nacionalista	3,548	13.27
Mountain Province's 1st	Felix Diaz	Nacionalista	2,935	10.98
Mountain Province's 1st	Francisco Dasayon	Nacionalista	2,906	10.87
Mountain Province's 1st	Ceferino Ramirez	Liberal	864	3.23
Mountain Province's 1st	Ducusin Awisi	Nacionalista	815	3.05
Mountain Province's 1st	Antonio Gacayon	Liberal	794	2.97
Mountain Province's 1st	Silvestre Vaggas	Nacionalista	652	2.44
Mountain Province's 2nd	Ramon P. Mitra (incumbent)	Democratic	8,139	36.89
Mountain Province's 2nd	Luis Lardizabal	Nacionalista	7,063	32.02
Mountain Province's 2nd	Dennis Molintas	Liberal	6,858	31.09
Mountain Province's 3rd	Luis Hora	Nacionalista	5,940	40.69
Mountain Province's 3rd	Gabriel Dunuan (incumbent)	Liberal	4,045	27.71
Mountain Province's 3rd	William Beyer	Nacionalista	3,472	23.78
Mountain Province's 3rd	Esteban Ligos	Liberal	587	4.02
Mountain Province's 3rd	Victor Codamon	Democratic	554	3.80
Negros Occidental's 1st	Jose Puey	Democratic	17,722	39.03
Negros Occidental's 1st	Ramon Lacson	Nacionalista	15,435	33.99
Negros Occidental's 1st	Hermogenes Yonzon	Liberal	9,754	21.48
Negros Occidental's 1st	Felipe Navarro	Independent	2,494	5.49
Negros Occidental's 2nd	Carlos Hilado (incumbent)	Democratic	25,144	53.73
Negros Occidental's 2nd	Ramon Torres	Liberal	21,640	46.24
Negros Occidental's 2nd	Fidel Henares	Nacionalista	15	0.03
Negros Occidental's 3rd	Agustin Gatuslao	Nacionalista	19,495	45.96
Negros Occidental's 3rd	Jacinto Montilla	Liberal	7,639	18.01
Negros Occidental's 3rd	Marino Rubin	Liberal	5,759	13.58
Negros Occidental's 3rd	Ernesto Rodriguez Jr.	Nacionalista	5,056	11.92
Negros Occidental's 3rd	Augurio Abeto	Liberal	3,278	7.73
Negros Occidental's 3rd	Juan Aritao	Liberal	1,180	2.78
Negros Occidental's 3rd	Emilio Martir	Liberal	5	0.01
Negros Occidental's 3rd	Ricardo Bañares	Democratic	3	0.01
Negros Occidental's 3rd	Teodorico Cordero	Independent	1	0.00
Negros Occidental's 3rd	Cesar Borromeo	Independent	0	0.00
Negros Oriental's 1st	Lorenzo Teves	Nacionalista	20,479	54.81
Negros Oriental's 1st	Genaro Goñi	Liberal	12,070	32.31
Negros Oriental's 1st	Deogracias Pinili	Liberal	2,996	8.02
Negros Oriental's 1st	Fructuoso Villarin	Liberal	1,277	3.42
Negros Oriental's 1st	Nicasio Garces	Democratic–Nacionalista	539	1.44
Negros Oriental's 2nd	Lamberto Macias	Nacionalista	13,329	52.75
Negros Oriental's 2nd	Enrique Medina (incumbent)	Liberal	11,938	47.25
Nueva Ecija's 1st	Jose Corpuz (incumbent)	Liberal	19,731	41.92
Nueva Ecija's 1st	Sixto Lustre	Nacionalista	14,525	30.86
Nueva Ecija's 1st	Alfonso Espinosa	Democratic	8,244	17.51
Nueva Ecija's 1st	Jose Robles Jr.	Democratic–Nacionalista	3,630	7.71
Nueva Ecija's 1st	Teodulo Cruz	NFLB	598	1.27
Nueva Ecija's 1st	Francisco Bumanlag	Democratic–Nacionalista	337	0.72
Nueva Ecija's 1st	Vivencio Ruiz	Nacionalista	7	0.01
Nueva Ecija's 2nd	Celestino Juan	Nacionalista	25,052	41.31
Nueva Ecija's 2nd	Jesus Ilagan (incumbent)	Liberal	22,740	37.50
Nueva Ecija's 2nd	Mariano Santa Romana	Nacionalista	11,195	18.46
Nueva Ecija's 2nd	Gregorio Cadhit	Democratic–Nacionalista	1,253	2.07
Nueva Ecija's 2nd	Armesto Ramoso	Democratic	396	0.65
Nueva Ecija's 2nd	Demetrio Advincula	Liberal (Independent)	2	0.00
Nueva Ecija's 2nd	Sergio Ortiz	Nacionalista	0	0.00
Nueva Vizcaya's lone	Leonardo B. Perez	Nacionalista	6,806	32.05
Nueva Vizcaya's lone	Leon Cabarroguis (incumbent)	Liberal	6,097	28.71
Nueva Vizcaya's lone	Jose Calderon	Nacionalista (Independent)	4,593	21.63
Nueva Vizcaya's lone	Dominador La Madrid	Democratic	3,387	15.95
Nueva Vizcaya's lone	Esteban Sadang	Independent	354	1.67
Occidental Mindoro's lone	Felipe Abeleda	Liberal	6,724	48.13
Occidental Mindoro's lone	Jesus Abeleda (incumbent)	Nacionalista	4,464	31.95
Occidental Mindoro's lone	Emilio Villamar	Democratic	2,778	19.88
Occidental Mindoro's lone	Antonio Rodriguez	Independent	5	0.04
Oriental Mindoro's lone	Conrado Morente	Democratic	15,444	44.38
Oriental Mindoro's lone	Alfredo Mendoza	Nacionalista	13,429	38.59
Oriental Mindoro's lone	Constancio Leuterio	Liberal	5,928	17.03
Palawan's lone	Gaudencio Abordo	Nacionalista	9,794	46.07
Palawan's lone	Jose Rodriguez	Liberal	9,087	42.74
Palawan's lone	Victorino Abrera	Nacionalista (Independent)	2,380	11.19
Pampanga's 1st	Diosdado Macapagal (incumbent)	Liberal	29,545	50.48
Pampanga's 1st	Jose Yap	Nacionalista	18,134	30.98
Pampanga's 1st	Eligio Lagman	Nacionalista	9,709	16.59
Pampanga's 1st	Felixberto Bustos	Nacionalista	1,137	1.94
Pampanga's 1st	Ricardo Quiambao	Independent	3	0.01
Pampanga's 2nd	Emilio Cortez	Nacionalista	19,128	41.92
Pampanga's 2nd	Jose Fausto	Independent	13,649	29.91
Pampanga's 2nd	Artemio Macalino (incumbent)	Liberal	10,974	24.05
Pampanga's 2nd	Fortunato Sazon	Democratic	1,880	4.12
Pangasinan's 1st	Mario Bengzon	Nacionalista	21,761	42.55
Pangasinan's 1st	Sulpicio Soriano (incumbent)	Liberal	12,577	24.59
Pangasinan's 1st	Porfirio Sison	Democratic	9,070	17.74
Pangasinan's 1st	Gerardo Quintos	Liberal	7,731	15.12
Pangasinan's 1st	Isidro Evangelista	Nacionalista	0	0.00
Pangasinan's 1st	Anastacio Gale	Liberal (Independent)	0	0.00
Pangasinan's 2nd	Eugenio Pérez (incumbent)	Liberal	26,190	56.47
Pangasinan's 2nd	Domingo Cabañgon	Nacionalista	20,175	43.50
Pangasinan's 2nd	Domingo Soriano	Democratic	11	0.02
Pangasinan's 3rd	Jose Parayno	Liberal	18,706	38.29
Pangasinan's 3rd	Benjamin Garcia	Nacionalista	17,706	36.24
Pangasinan's 3rd	Marcelino Bautista	Nacionalista (Independent)	5,560	11.38
Pangasinan's 3rd	Onofre Guevarra	Democratic	5,030	10.30
Pangasinan's 3rd	Maximino Ferreol	Nacionalista	1,853	3.79
Pangasinan's 4th	Amadeo Perez (incumbent)	Liberal	19,608	45.44
Pangasinan's 4th	Eligio Tavanlar	Nacionalista	17,090	39.61
Pangasinan's 4th	Roque Tomeldan	Democratic	6,439	14.92
Pangasinan's 4th	Benito Valdez	Independent	11	0.03
Pangasinan's 5th	Justino Benito	Liberal	13,064	32.26
Pangasinan's 5th	Luciano Millan	Nacionalista	12,281	30.32
Pangasinan's 5th	Benigno Parayno	Liberal	6,030	14.89
Pangasinan's 5th	Flaviano Magpali	Nacionalista	3,582	8.84
Pangasinan's 5th	Venancio Duque	Liberal	2,971	7.34
Pangasinan's 5th	Jovencio Zaragoza	Democratic (Liberal)	2,370	5.85
Pangasinan's 5th	Basilio Collado	Liberal (Independent)	200	0.49
Quezon's 1st	Manuel S. Enverga	Nacionalista	17,362	28.82
Quezon's 1st	Rafael de la Peña	Nacionalista (Independent)	15,733	26.12
Quezon's 1st	Vicente Umali	Liberal	12,757	21.18
Quezon's 1st	Fortunato Suarez	Democratic	7,373	12.24
Quezon's 1st	Eduvigio Antona	Nacionalista	4,093	6.79
Quezon's 1st	Felipe Lopez	Independent	1,219	2.02
Quezon's 1st	Elias Desembrana	Nacionalista	704	1.17
Quezon's 1st	Amando Zaballero	Nacionalista	334	0.55
Quezon's 1st	Domingo Casiño	Liberal (Independent)	307	0.51
Quezon's 1st	Felix Magpantay	Nacionalista (Independent)	299	0.50
Quezon's 1st	Rafael Borja	Nacionalista (Independent)	55	0.09
Quezon's 2nd	Leon Guinto Jr.	Nacionalista	23,973	50.60
Quezon's 2nd	Gregorio Santayana	Liberal	14,938	31.53
Quezon's 2nd	Gaudencio Vera (incumbent)	Liberal	8,465	17.87
Quezon's 2nd	Vicente Vilar	Nacionalista	2	0.00
Quezon's 2nd	Boanerges Pumarada	Liberal	1	0.00
Quezon's 2nd	Jose Desvarro	Citizens	0	0.00
Rizal's 1st	Eulogio Rodriguez Jr. (incumbent)	Nacionalista	109,164	65.59
Rizal's 1st	Jose Marcelo	Liberal	57,063	34.28
Rizal's 1st	Juan Aldea	Independent	217	0.13
Rizal's 2nd	Serafin Salvador	Democratic	26,269	45.57
Rizal's 2nd	Sixto Antonio	Liberal	19,148	33.22
Rizal's 2nd	Juvencio Ortañez	Nacionalista	12,223	21.21
Romblon's lone	Florencio Moreno (incumbent)	Nacionalista	10,642	51.51
Romblon's lone	Jovencio Mayor	Liberal	10,019	48.49
Samar's 1st	Gregorio Tan	Nacionalista	21,223	46.83
Samar's 1st	Vicente Dira	Liberal	16,415	36.22
Samar's 1st	Agripino Escareal (incumbent)	Liberal	7,678	16.94
Samar's 2nd	Marciano Lim	Nacionalista	16,190	46.49
Samar's 2nd	Tito Tizon (incumbent)	Liberal	15,597	44.78
Samar's 2nd	Fernando Froilan	Nacionalista	1,717	4.93
Samar's 2nd	Eugenio Lohla	Nacionalista	1,323	3.80
Samar's 3rd	Gregorio Abogado (incumbent)	Liberal	11,144	33.03
Samar's 3rd	Lucilo Picardo	Nacionalista	9,499	28.15
Samar's 3rd	Jose Camenforte	Independent	4,766	14.12
Samar's 3rd	Aurelio Alegre	Independent	4,511	13.37
Samar's 3rd	Donato Cardona	Liberal (Independent)	3,807	11.28
Samar's 3rd	Pablo Añosa	Democratic	13	0.04
Samar's 3rd	Pedro Montero	Liberal	2	0.01
Samar's 3rd	Pastor Sajorda	Independent	1	0.00
Sorsogon's 1st	Salvador Encinas	Liberal	11,183	39.09
Sorsogon's 1st	Modesto Galias (incumbent)	Nacionalista	8,108	28.34
Sorsogon's 1st	Leon Gajo	Democratic	5,907	20.65
Sorsogon's 1st	Justiniano Asuncion	Nacionalista	3,413	11.93
Sorsogon's 2nd	Vicente Peralta	Nacionalista	17,108	54.06
Sorsogon's 2nd	Tomas Clemente (incumbent)	Liberal	14,539	45.94
Sulu's lone	Ombra Amilbangsa (incumbent)	Liberal	6,585	27.11
Sulu's lone	Alling Abubakar	Liberal (Independent)	5,229	21.53
Sulu's lone	Salih Ututalum	Nacionalista	5,199	21.40
Sulu's lone	Akuk Sangkula	Democratic	4,971	20.47
Sulu's lone	Alawadin Bandon	Nacionalista	1,341	5.52
Sulu's lone	Tome Biteng	Nacionalista	964	3.97
Surigao's lone	Reynaldo Honrado	Nacionalista	18,982	34.39
Surigao's lone	David Avila	Liberal	17,098	30.98
Surigao's lone	Bernardino Almeda	Nacionalista	13,110	23.75
Surigao's lone	Gonzalo Vasquez	Liberal	5,564	10.08
Surigao's lone	Cipriano Alvizo	Democratic	443	0.80
Surigao's lone	Rustico Egay	Liberal (Independent)	0	0.00
Tarlac's 1st	Jose Roy (incumbent)	Democratic	13,829	37.27
Tarlac's 1st	Eleodoro Castro	Nacionalista	9,051	24.39
Tarlac's 1st	Antonio Lopez	Liberal	8,744	23.57
Tarlac's 1st	Tirso Aganon	Nacionalista	5,478	14.76
Tarlac's 2nd	Constancio Castañeda	Nacionalista	24,062	51.69
Tarlac's 2nd	Jose Feliciano (incumbent)	Liberal	22,485	48.31
Tarlac's 2nd	Jesus Quiambao	Independent	0	0.00
Zambales' lone	Enrique Corpus	Nacionalista	25,991	65.47
Zambales' lone	Cesar Miraflor (incumbent)	Liberal	10,915	27.50
Zambales' lone	Nicolas Adamos	Nacionalista	1,557	3.92
Zambales' lone	Francisco Nepomuceno	Independent	867	2.18
Zambales' lone	Vicente Feria	Nacionalista	366	0.92
Zambales' lone	Francisco Araña	Nacionalista	1	0.00
Zamboanga del Norte's lone	Alberto Ubay	Liberal	9,887	35.59
Zamboanga del Norte's lone	Germanico Carreon	Nacionalista	6,284	22.62
Zamboanga del Norte's lone	Romulo Garrovillo	Democratic	5,245	18.88
Zamboanga del Norte's lone	Jose Baloria	Nacionalista	4,780	17.21
Zamboanga del Norte's lone	Bartolome Regencia	Nacionalista	1,582	5.70
Zamboanga del Sur's lone	Roseller T. Lim	Nacionalista	30,723	65.18
Zamboanga del Sur's lone	Manuel Jaldon	Liberal	13,258	28.13
Zamboanga del Sur's lone	Saturnino Requiroso	People	3,155	6.69
Source: Commission on Elections

== See also ==
- 3rd Congress of the Philippines

== Bibliography ==
- Paras, Corazon L. (2000). The Presidents of the Senate of the Republic of the Philippines. ISBN 971-8832-24-6.
- Pobre, Cesar P. (2000). Philippine Legislature 100 Years. ISBN 971-92245-0-9.
