= 1953 Philippine general election =

- November 10, 1953
- Presidential election
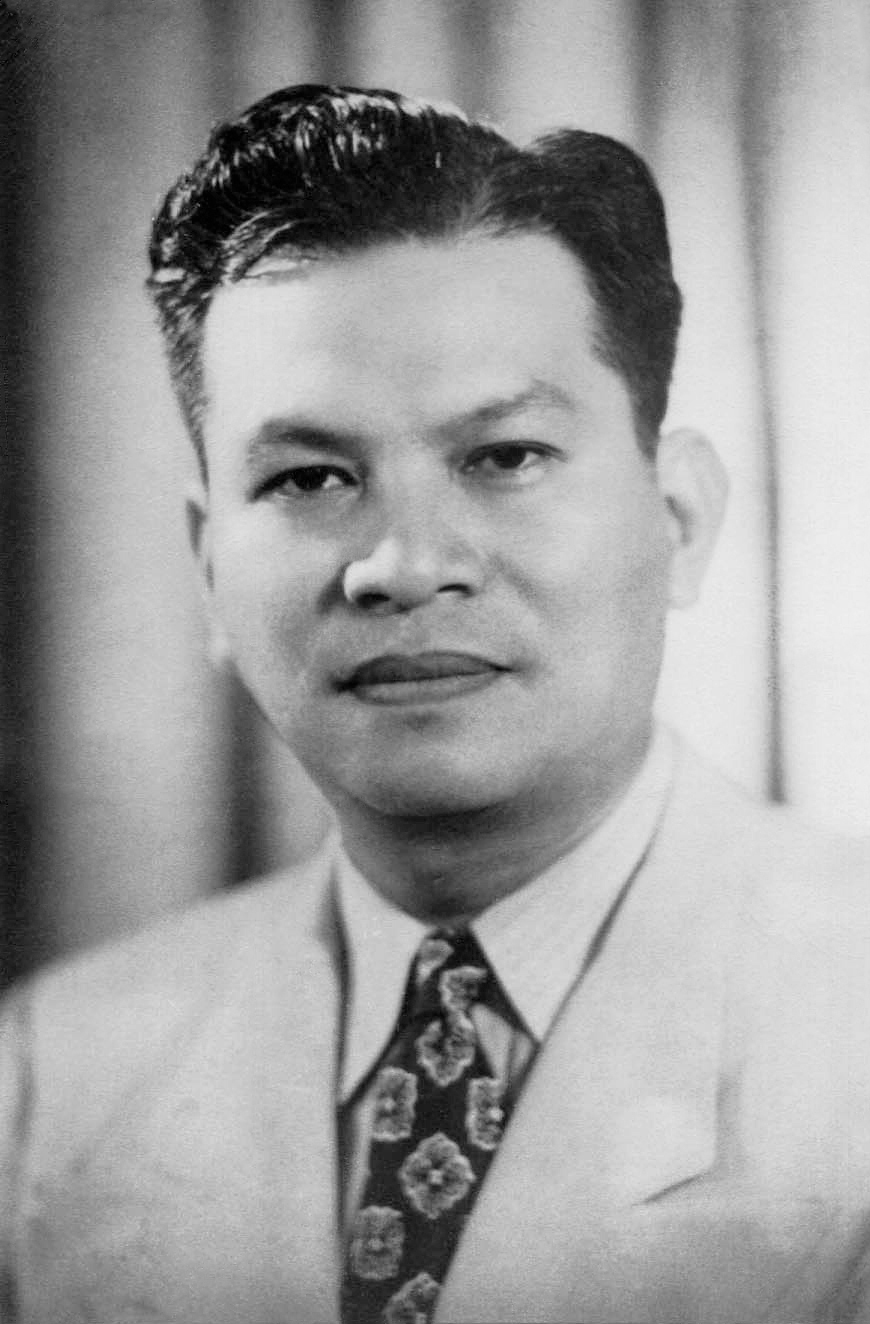

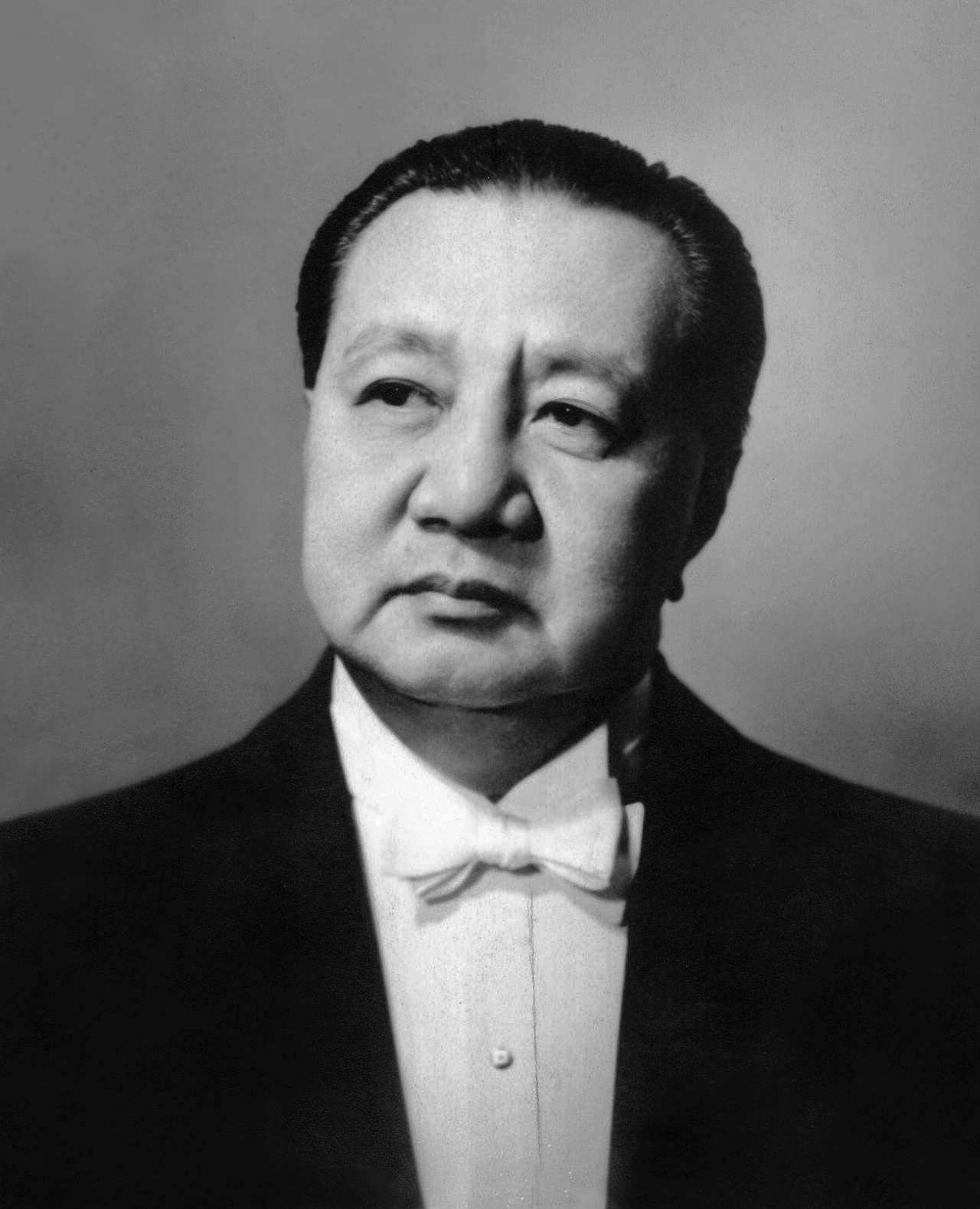
Nominee	Ramon Magsaysay	Elpidio Quirino
Party	Nacionalista	Liberal
Running mate	Carlos P. Garcia	José Yulo
Popular vote	2,912,992	1,313,991
Percentage	68.90%	31.08%
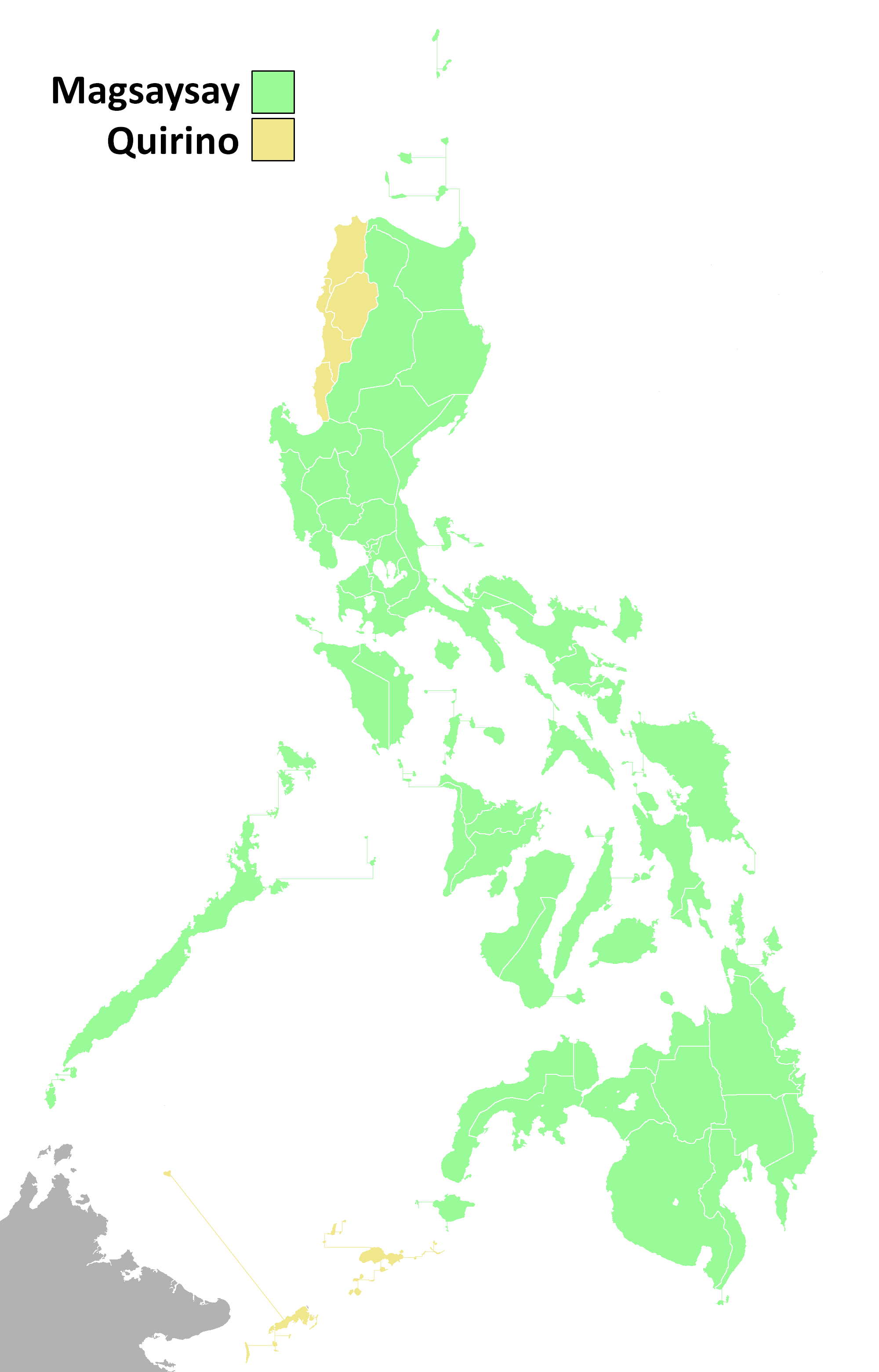
- Election results per province/city.
President before election
Elpidio Quirino
Liberal
Elected President
Ramon Magsaysay
Nacionalista
- Vice presidential election
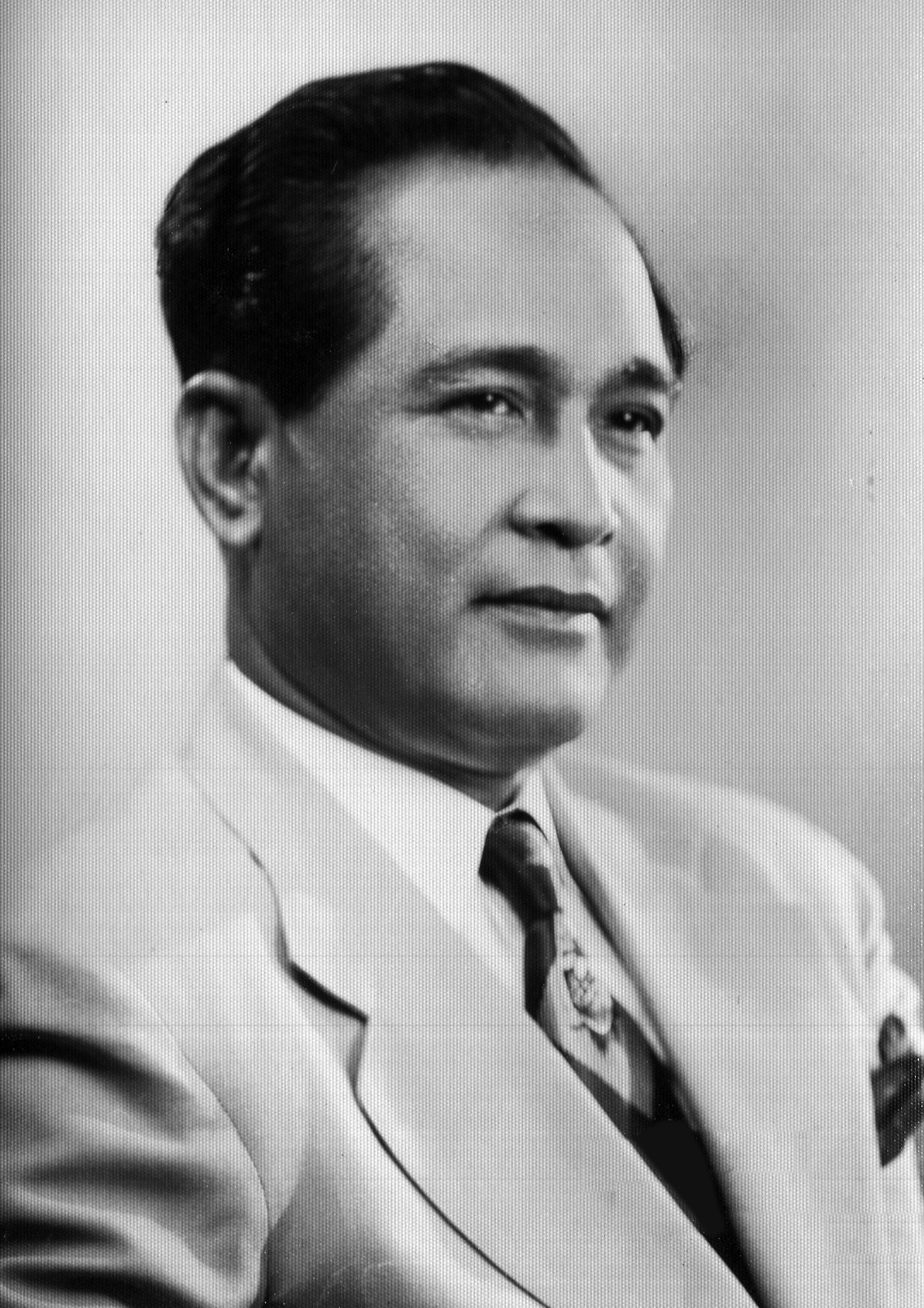

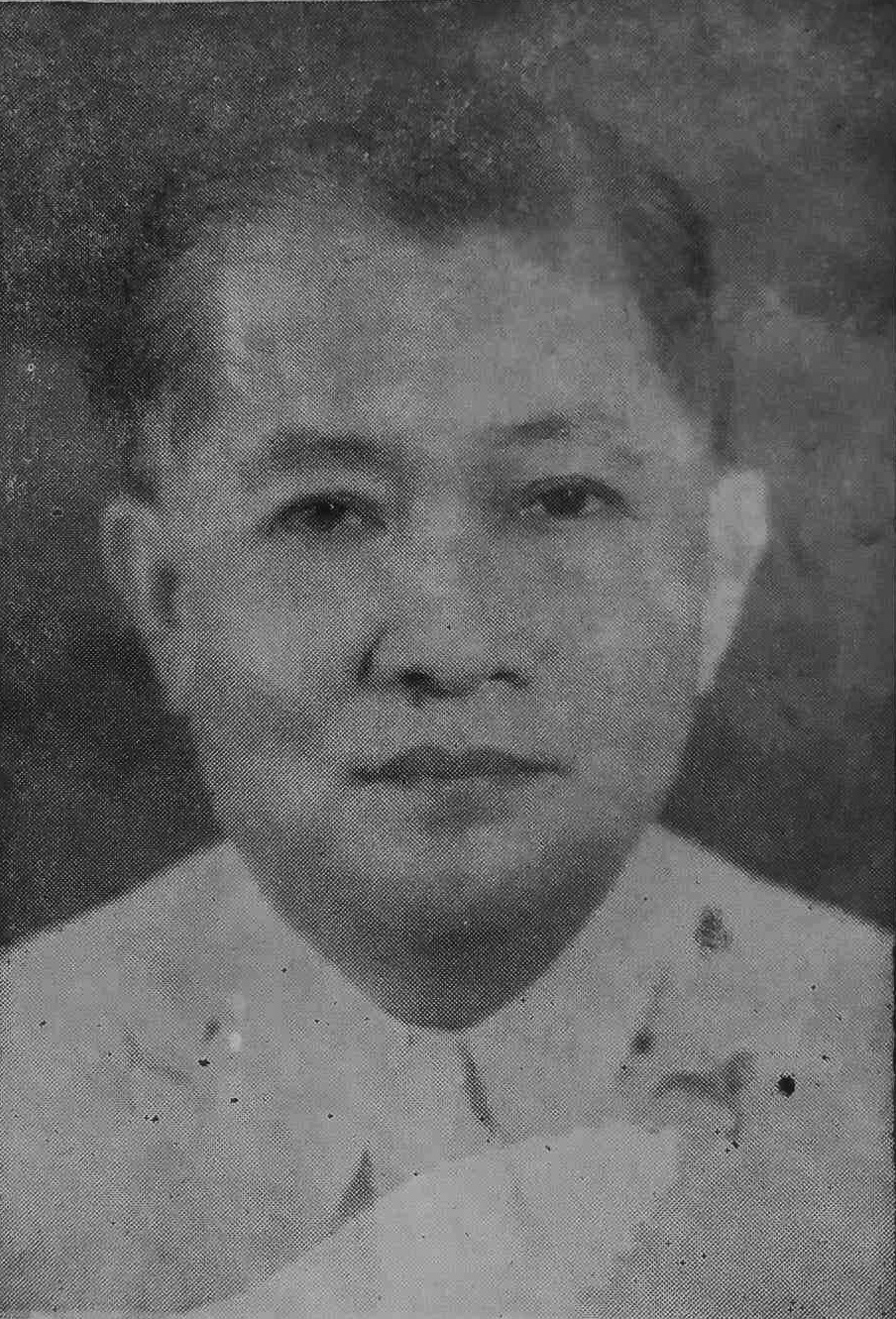
Candidate	Carlos P. Garcia	José Yulo
Party	Nacionalista	Liberal
Popular vote	2,515,265	1,483,802
Percentage	62.90%	37.10%
Vice President before election
Fernando Lopez
Democratic
Elected Vice President
Carlos P. Garcia
Nacionalista
- Senate election

8 of the 24 seats in the Philippine Senate 13 needs for a majority
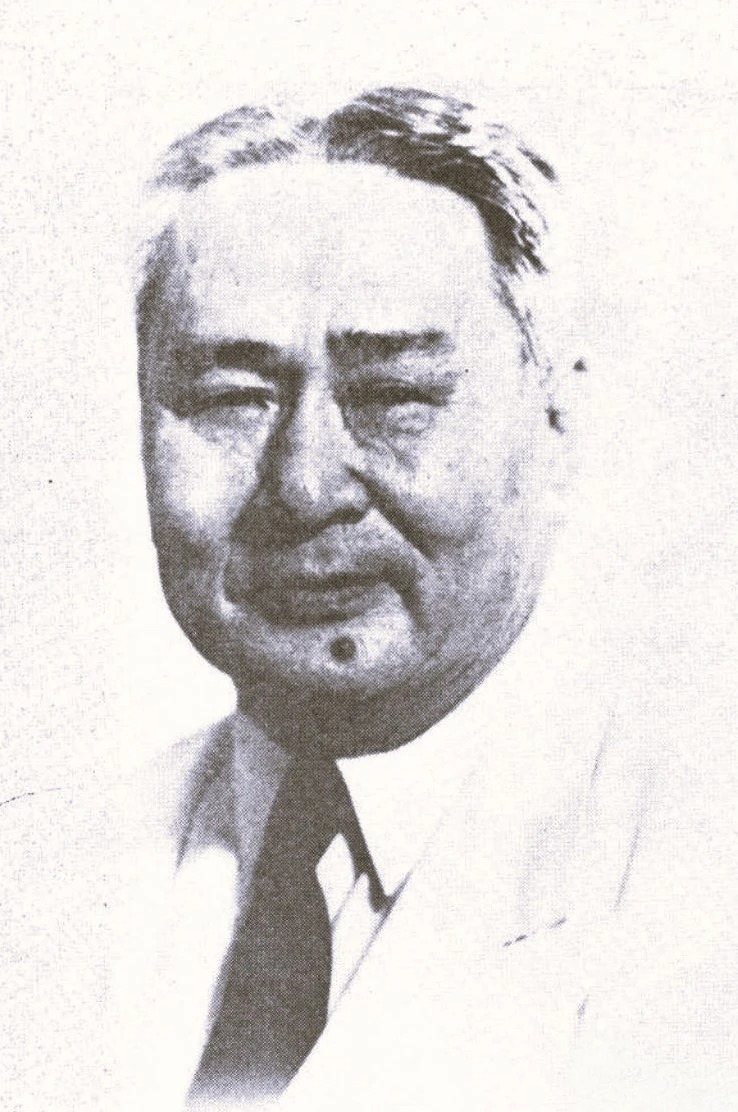

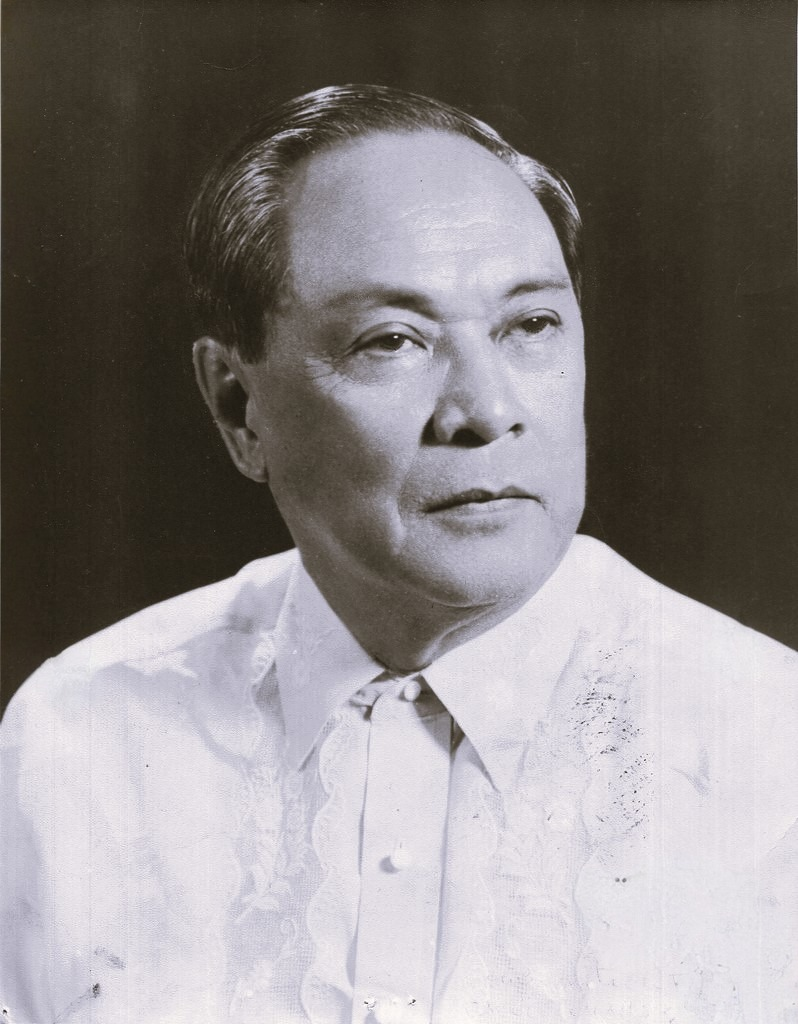

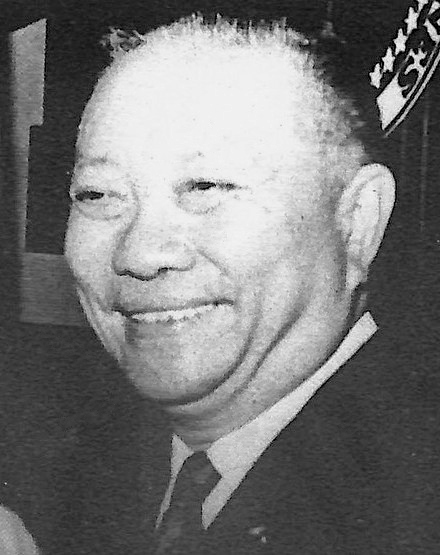

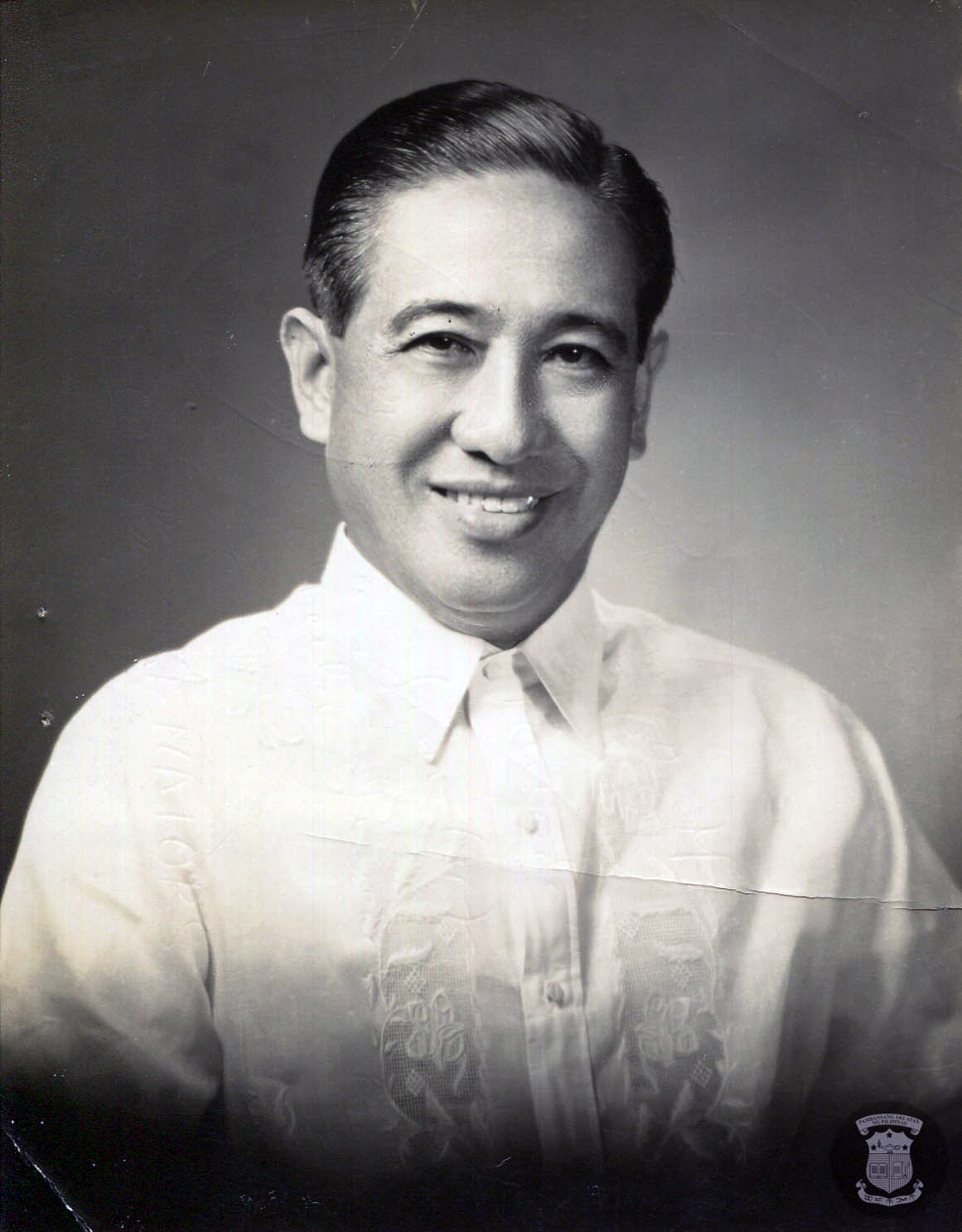
	First party	Second party
Leader	Eulogio Rodriguez	Quintin Paredes
Party	Nacionalista	Liberal
Seats before	11 (3 up)	11 (3 up)
Seats won	5	0
Seats after	13	7
Seat change	▲2	▼4
Popular vote	9,813,166	8,861,244
Percentage	39.83	35.97
Swing	▼18.37	▼2.22
	Third party	Fourth party
Leader	Fernando Lopez	Lorenzo Tañada
Party	Democratic	Citizens
Seats before	0	1 (1 up)
Seats won	2	1
Seats after	2	1
Seat change	▲2	Steady
Popular vote	3,793,654	2,156,717
Percentage	15.40	8.75
Swing	▲15.40	▲8.75
Senate President before election
Jose Zulueta
Nacionalista
Elected Senate President
Eulogio Rodriguez
Nacionalista
- House elections

All 102 seats in the House of Representatives of the Philippines 52 seats needed for a majority
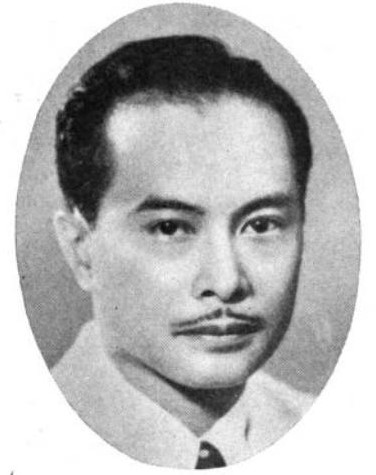

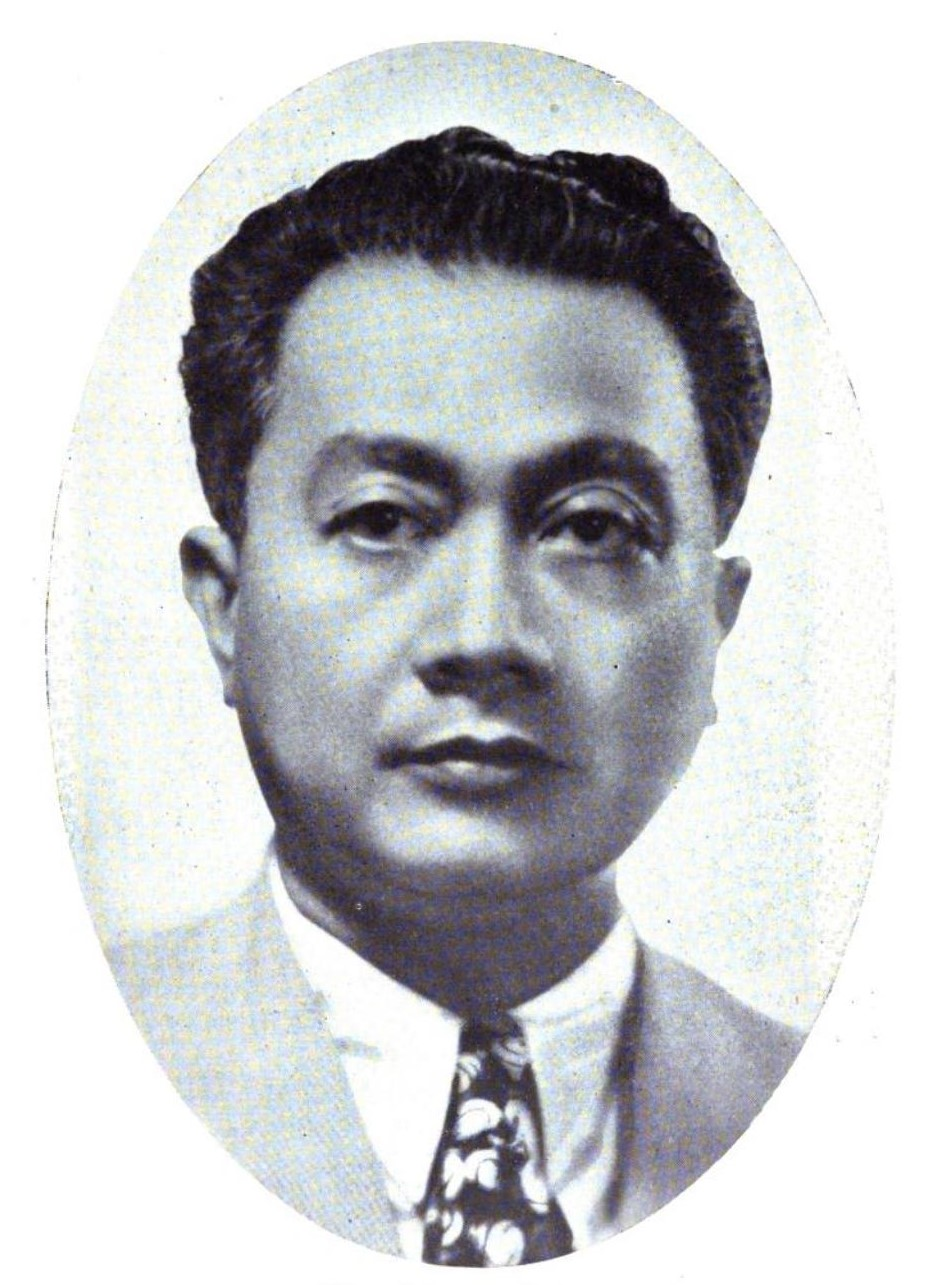

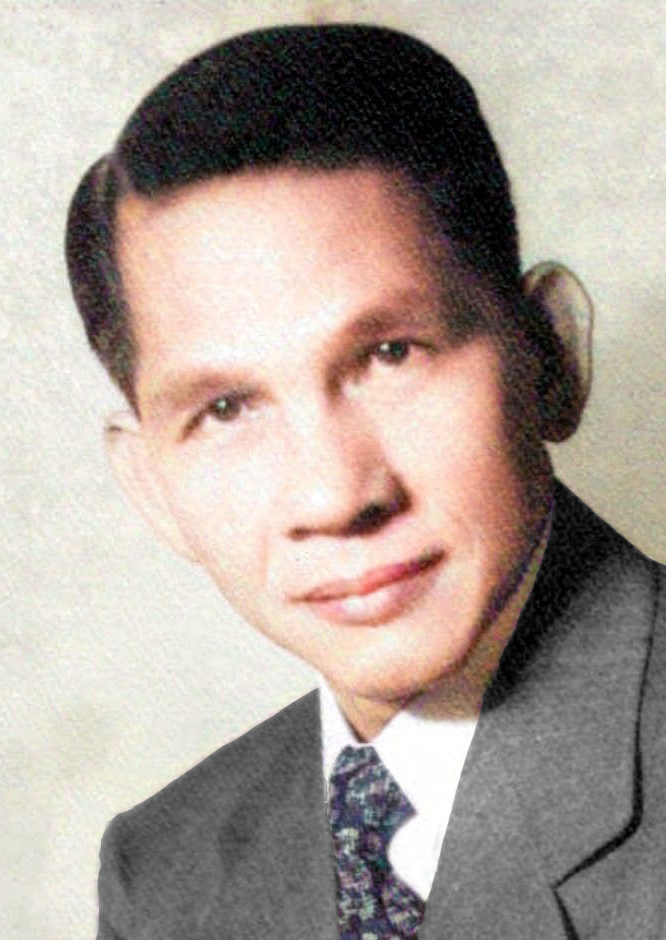
	First party	Second party	Third party
Leader	Jose Laurel Jr.	Eugenio Pérez	Jose Roy
Party	Nacionalista	Liberal	Democratic
Leader's seat	Batangas–3rd	Pangasinan–2nd	Tarlac–1st
Last election	33 seats, 34.05%	60 seats, 53%	Party does not exist
Seats won	59	31	9
Seat change	▲26	▼29	▲9
Popular vote	1,930,367	1,624,571	284,222
Percentage	47.30	39.81	6.96
Swing	▲13.25	▼24.32	▲6.85
Speaker before election
Eugenio Pérez
Liberal
Elected Speaker
Jose Laurel Jr.
Nacionalista

Presidential, legislative and local elections were held in the Philippines on November 10, 1953. Incumbent President Elpidio Quirino lost his opportunity to get a second full term as President of the Philippines to former Defense Secretary Ramon Magsaysay. His running mate, Senator Jose Yulo lost to Senator Carlos P. Garcia. Vice President Fernando Lopez did not run for re-election. This was the first time that an elected president did not come from the Senate. This election also saw the involvement of the United States with the Central Intelligence Agency (CIA) with agent Edward Lansdale running Magsaysay's campaign. Other candidates competed for CIA support too and many normal Filipinos were interested in what the United States citizens views were on it.

== Results ==
=== President ===
Candidate	Party	Votes	%
Ramon Magsaysay	Nacionalista Party	2,912,992	68.90
Elpidio Quirino (incumbent)	Liberal Party	1,313,991	31.08
Gaudencio Bueno	Independent	736	0.02
Total		4,227,719	100.00
Valid votes		4,227,719	97.71
Invalid/blank votes		98,987	2.29
Total votes		4,326,706	100.00
Registered voters/turnout		5,603,231	77.22
Source: Nohlen, Grotz, Hartmann, Hasall and Santos

=== Vice-President ===
Candidate	Party	Votes	%
Carlos P. Garcia	Nacionalista Party	2,515,265	62.90
José Yulo	Liberal Party	1,483,802	37.10
Total		3,999,067	100.00
Valid votes		3,999,067	92.43
Invalid/blank votes		327,639	7.57
Total votes		4,326,706	100.00
Registered voters/turnout		5,603,231	77.22
Source: Nohlen, Grotz, Hartmann, Hasall and Santos

=== Senate ===
Representation of results; seats contested are inside the box. Nacionalista Party Liberal Party Democratic Party Vacancy

Candidate	Party	Votes	%
Fernando Lopez	Democratic Party	2,272,642	52.53
Lorenzo Tañada	Citizens' Party	2,156,717	49.85
Eulogio Rodriguez	Nacionalista Party	2,071,844	47.89
Emmanuel Pelaez	Nacionalista Party	2,010,128	46.46
Edmundo B. Cea	Nacionalista Party	1,961,705	45.34
Mariano Jesús Cuenco	Nacionalista Party	1,853,247	42.83
Alejo Mabanag	Nacionalista Party	1,846,190	42.67
Ruperto Kangleon	Democratic Party	1,521,012	35.15
Geronima Pecson	Liberal Party	1,349,163	31.18
Camilo Osías	Liberal Party	1,324,567	30.61
Jose Figueroa	Liberal Party	1,194,952	27.62
Vicente Madrigal	Liberal Party	1,155,577	26.71
José Avelino	Liberal Party	1,012,599	23.40
Jacinto O. Borja	Liberal Party	968,841	22.39
Salipada Pendatun	Liberal Party	945,755	21.86
Pablo Ángeles David	Liberal Party	909,790	21.03
Felixberto Verano	Nacionalista Party	59,782	1.38
Jose Maria Veloso	Nacionalista Party	10,270	0.24
Alfredo Abcede	Federal Party	5,365	0.12
Concepcion R. Lim de Planas	Independent	4,439	0.10
Total		24,634,585	100.00
Total votes		4,326,706	–
Registered voters/turnout		5,603,231	77.22

=== House of Representatives ===
Party	Votes	%	+/–	Seats	+/–
Nacionalista Party	1,930,367	47.30	+13.25	59	+26
Liberal Party	1,624,571	39.81	−24.32	31	−29
Democratic Party	284,222	6.96	+6.85	9	New
Democratic Party/Nacionalista Party	58,667	1.44	New	2	New
Nacionalista Party (independent)	42,081	1.03	New	0	0
Liberal Party (independent)	25,927	0.64	New	0	0
People's Party	3,155	0.08	New	0	0
New Young Philippines	620	0.02	New	0	0
Republican Party	431	0.01	New	0	0
Independent	111,160	2.72	+1.30	1	0
Total	4,081,201	100.00	–	102	+2
Valid votes	4,081,201	94.33	−2.35		
Invalid/blank votes	245,495	5.67	+2.35		
Total votes	4,326,696	100.00	–		
Registered voters/turnout	5,603,231	77.22	+9.83		
Source: Nohlen, Grotz and Hartmann and Teehankee

== See also ==
- Commission on Elections
- Politics of the Philippines
- Philippine elections
- President of the Philippines
- 3rd Congress of the Philippines
