= 1953 Philippine presidential election =

5th election of Philippine president

- November 10, 1953
- Turnout: 77.22 (▲7.52pp)
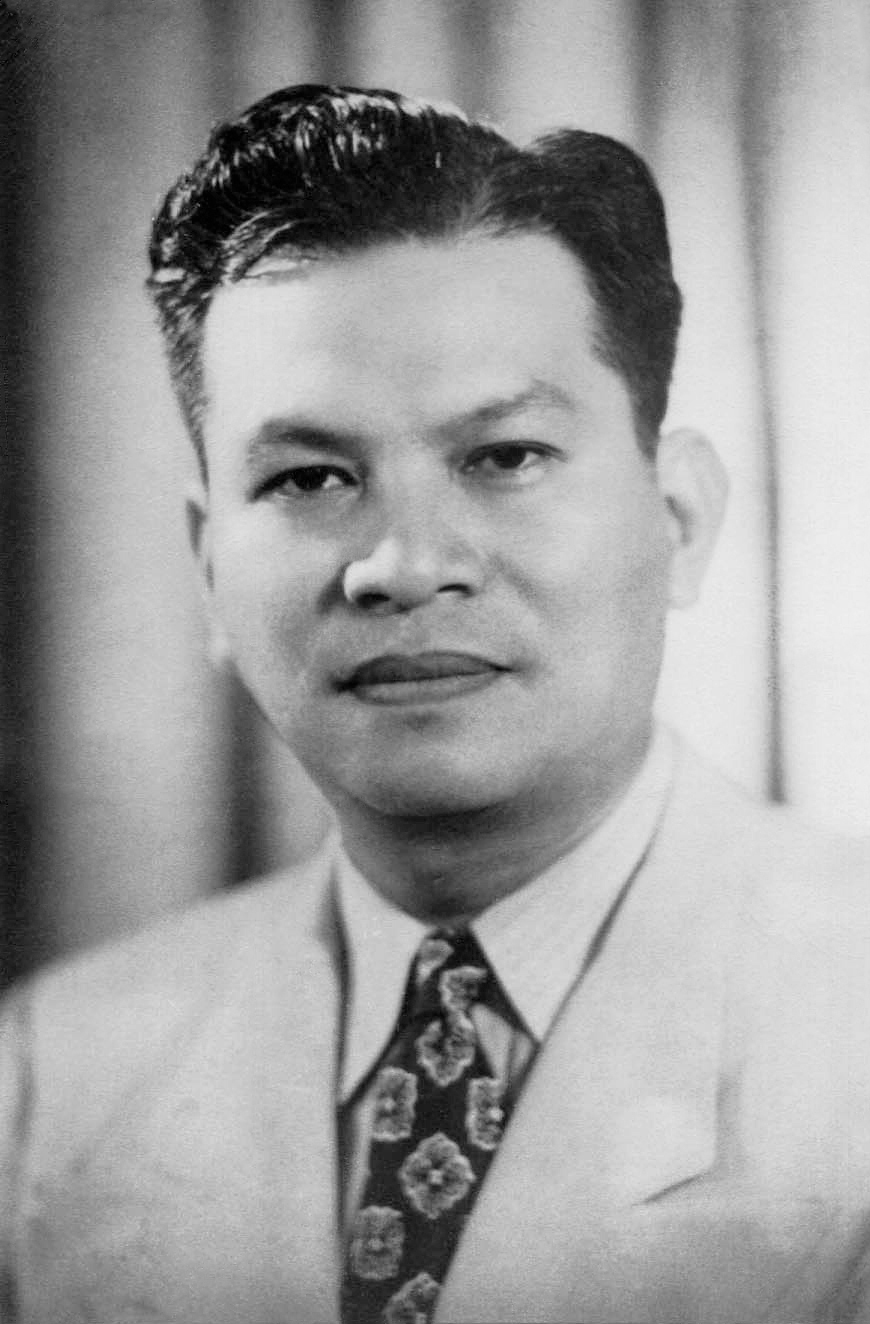

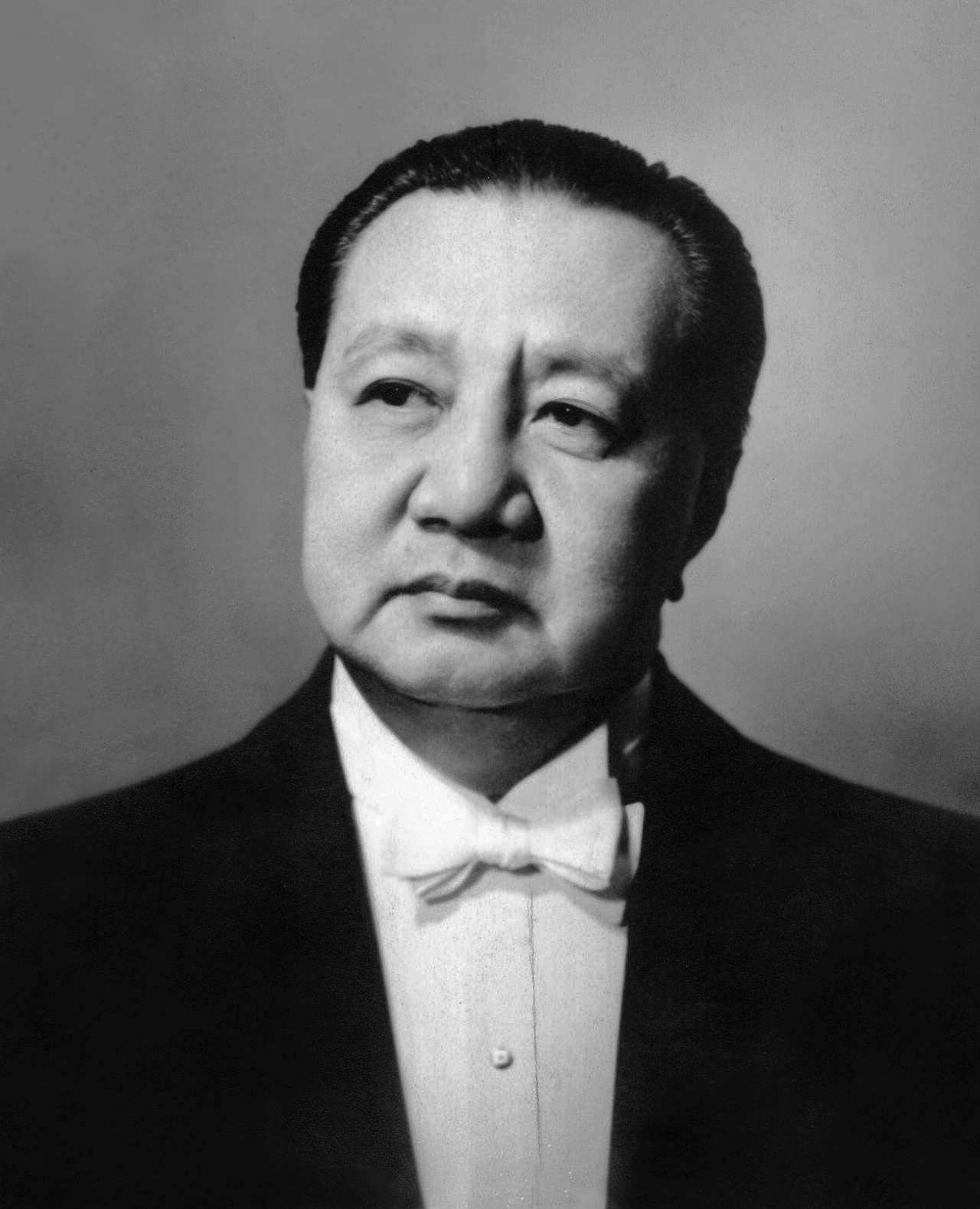
Nominee	Ramon Magsaysay	Elpidio Quirino
Party	Nacionalista	Liberal
Running mate	Carlos P. Garcia	José Yulo
Popular vote	2,912,992	1,313,991
Percentage	68.90%	31.08%
- Election results per province/city.
President before election
Elpidio Quirino
Liberal
Elected President
Ramon Magsaysay
Nacionalista
- 1953 Philippine vice presidential election
- November 10, 1953
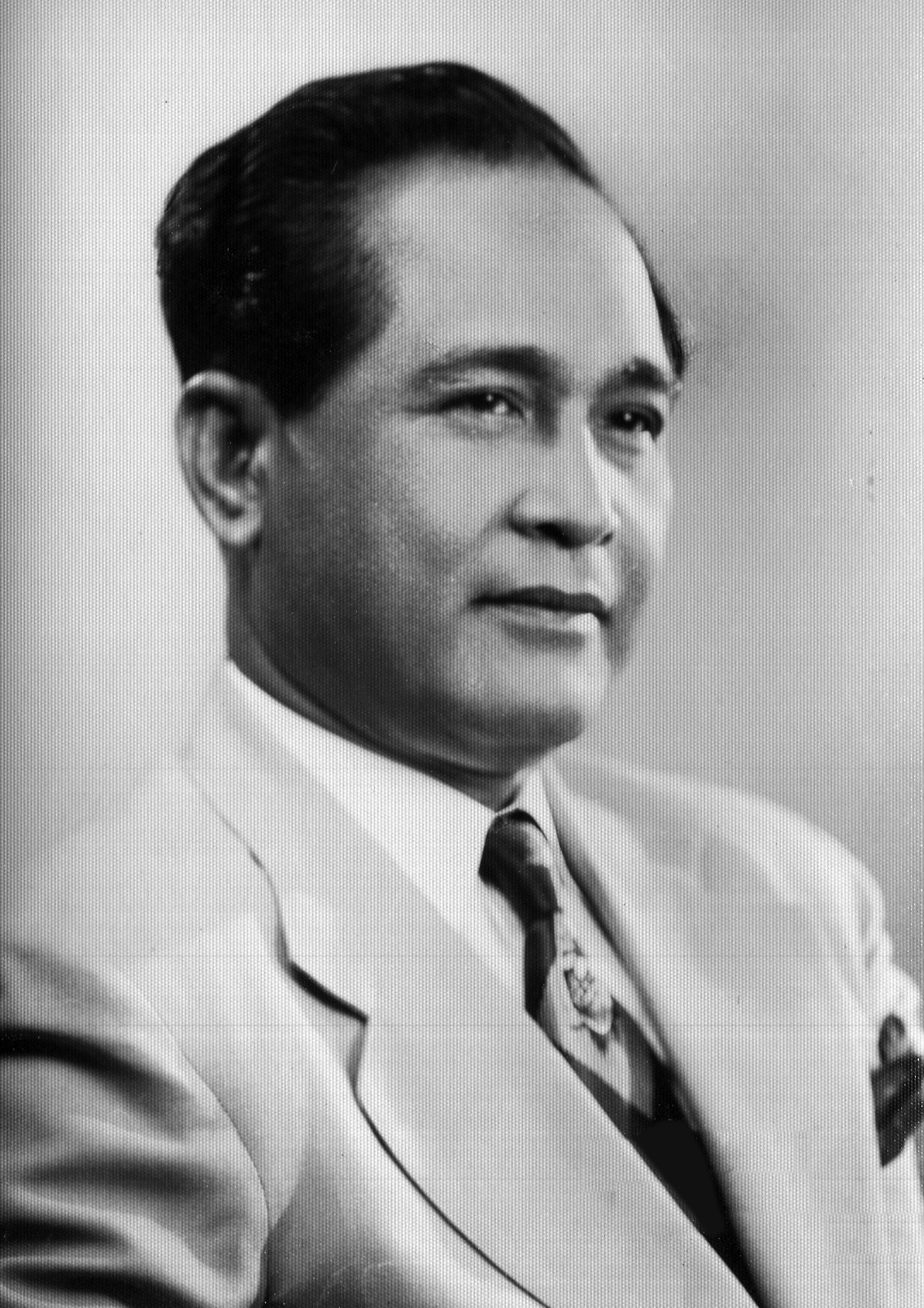

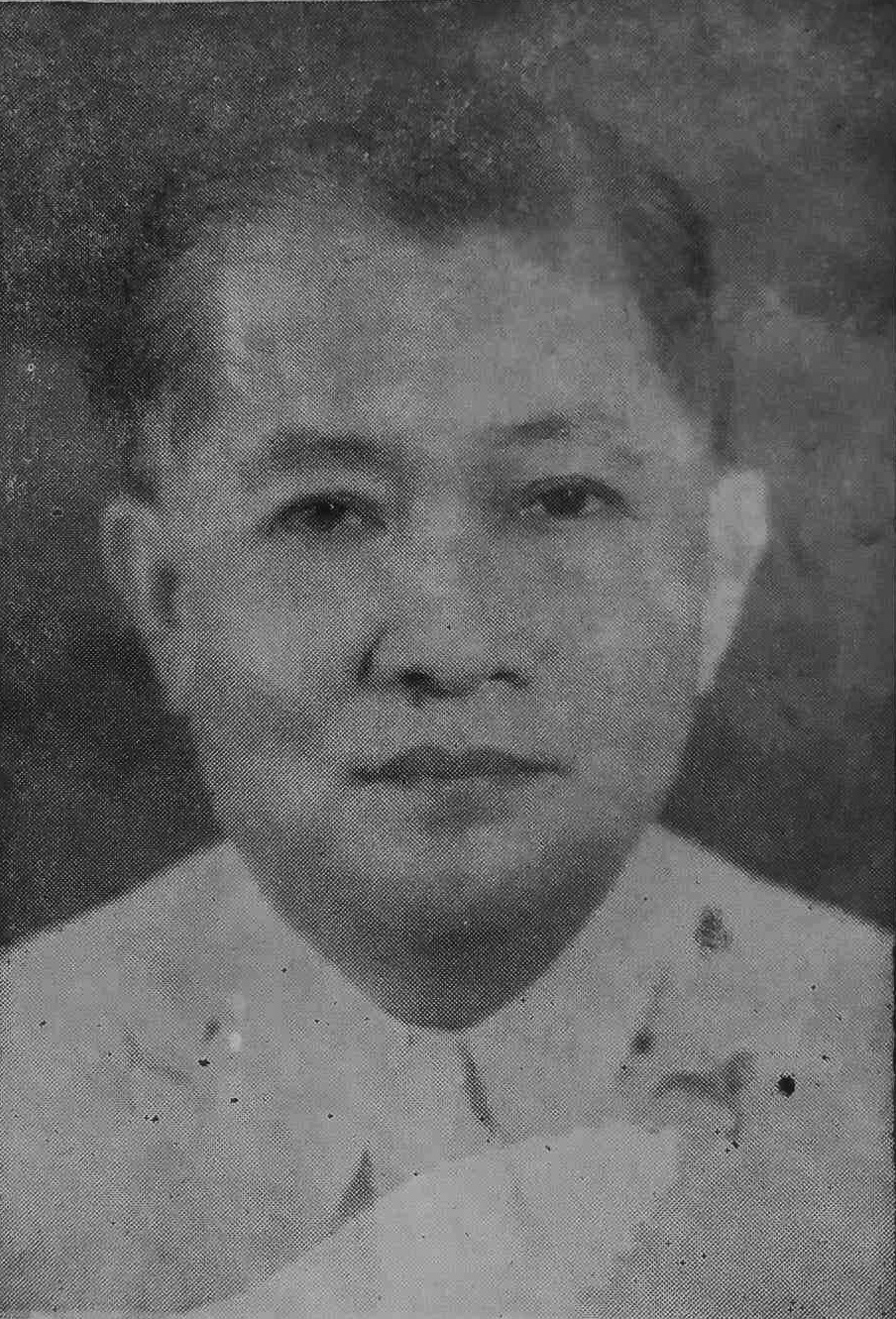
Candidate	Carlos P. Garcia	José Yulo
Party	Nacionalista	Liberal
Popular vote	2,515,265	1,483,802
Percentage	62.90%	37.10%
- Election results per province/city.
Vice President before election
Fernando Lopez
Democratic
Elected Vice President
Carlos P. Garcia
Nacionalista

Presidential and vice presidential elections were held in the Philippines on November 10, 1953. Former Defense Secretary Ramon Magsaysay was elected President of the Philippines, defeating Incumbent Elpidio Quirino in his run for a second full term. His running mate Senator Carlos P. Garcia defeated Quirino's running mate Senator José Yulo. Incumbent Vice President Fernando Lopez did not run for re-election. With Magsaysay's election as president, he became the first elected president that did not come from the Senate.

The elections were free and fair.

== Summary ==
After seven years of Liberal rule, the Nacionalista Party lacked a strong presidential candidate to end the regime.

=== Nacionalista Party ===
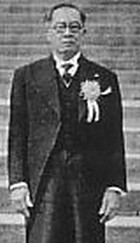
Senator Jose P. Laurel

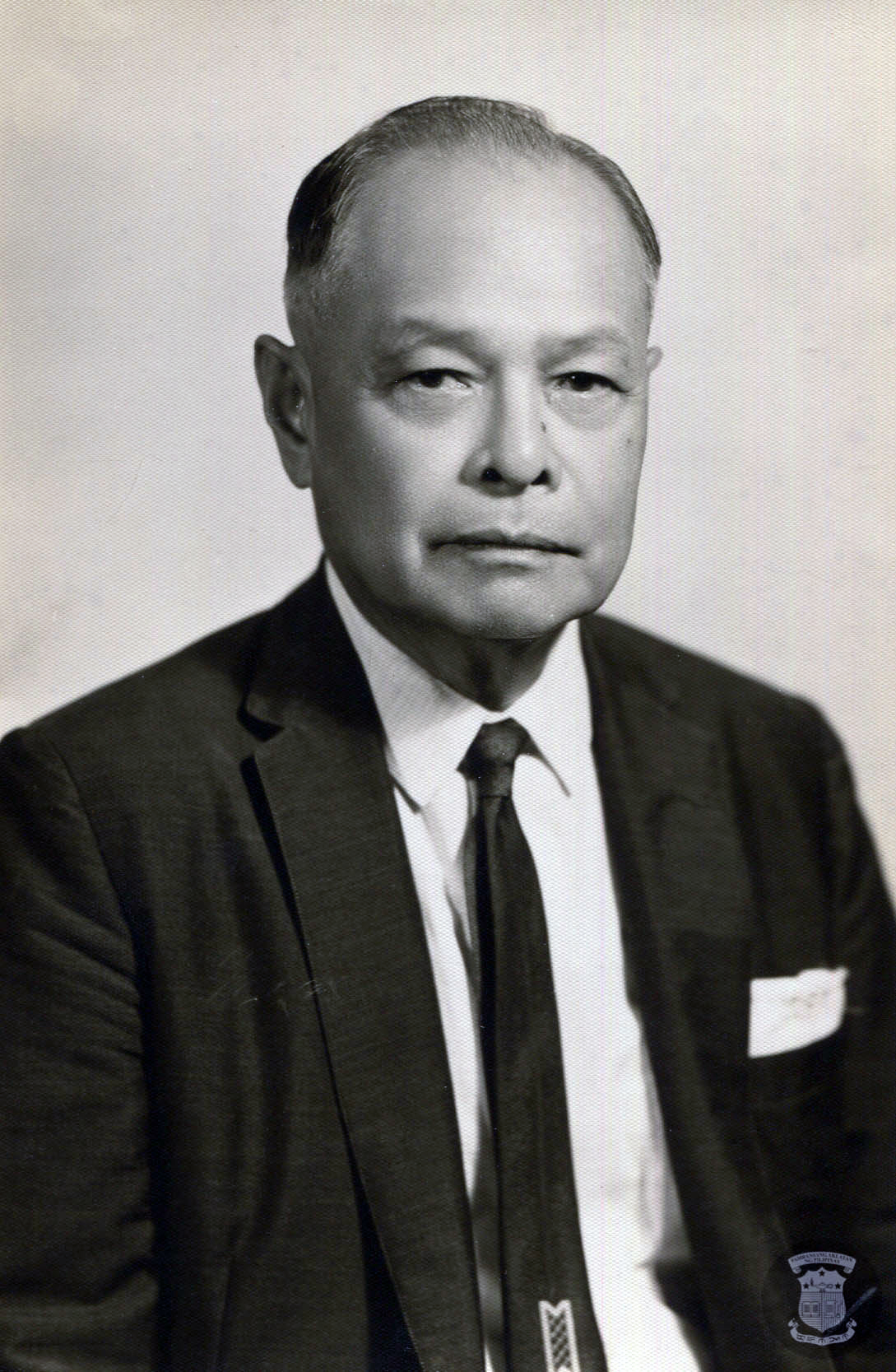
Senate President Camilo Osías

Former President and then-Senator Jose P. Laurel initially had intentions to seek the Nacionalista's nomination for president in 1953 but did not go through with it. He then proposed to endorse Secretary of National Defense Ramon Magsaysay, whose successful anti-insurgency and anti-communist initiatives had strained his relations with President Quirino and the Liberal.

Senate President Camilo Osías sought the presidential nomination but ultimately lost to Magsaysay. Senator Carlos P. Garcia of Bohol was picked to be his running-mate.

=== Liberal Party ===
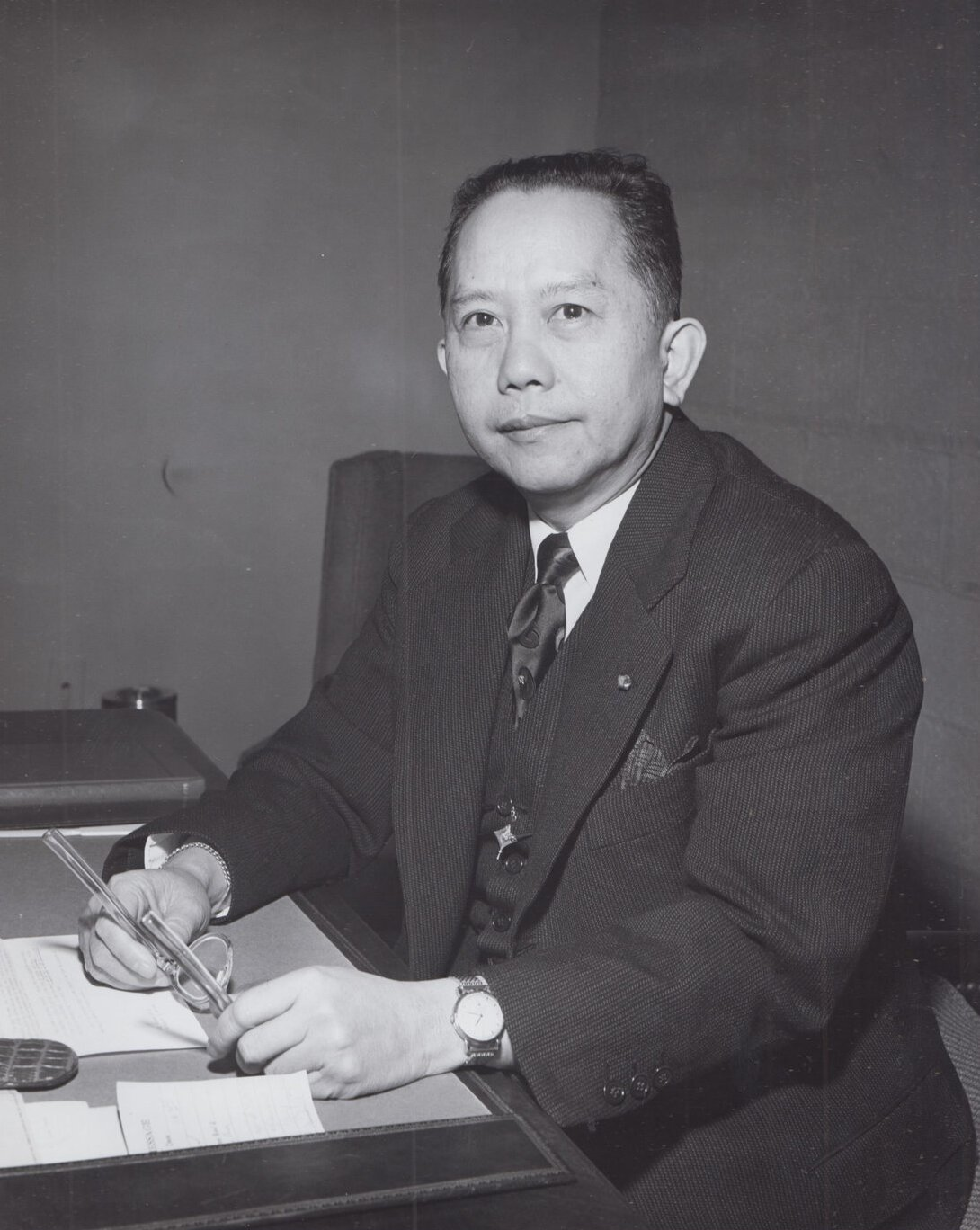
Former Foreign Affairs Secretary Carlos P. Romulo

The Liberal Party renominated President Elpidio Quirino and former House Speaker and Liberal Party President José Yulo for president and vice-president respectively.

Following the nomination, Philippine Ambassador to Washington Carlos P. Romulo and his men walked out of the Liberal convention and formed the Democratic Party. The Democratic Party then nominated Romulo for the presidency and supported the re-election of Vice President Fernando Lopez.

What was supposed to be a three-way race was reduced to a battle between the ruling Liberals against the Nacionalistas after the Democratic candidates withdrew in support of Magsaysay, resulting in the Nacionalista-Democratic coalition.

== Results ==
=== President ===
Magsaysay carried most of the provinces except Ilocos Norte, Ilocos Sur, La Union, Tawi-Tawi, Sulu and Abra in which Ilocos Sur is a bailiwick and home province of President Quirino.

Candidate	Party	Votes	%
Ramon Magsaysay	Nacionalista Party	2,912,992	68.90
Elpidio Quirino (incumbent)	Liberal Party	1,313,991	31.08
Gaudencio Bueno	Independent	736	0.02
Total		4,227,719	100.00
Valid votes		4,227,719	97.71
Invalid/blank votes		98,987	2.29
Total votes		4,326,706	100.00
Registered voters/turnout		5,603,231	77.22
Source: Nohlen, Grotz, Hartmann, Hasall and Santos

Popular vote
Magsaysay	68.90%
Quirino	31.08%
Others	0.02%

==== Results by province and city ====
Province/City	Magsaysay		Quirino		Bueno	
Province/City	Votes	%	Votes	%	Votes	%
Abra	7,315	30.48	16,672	69.48	9	0.04
Agusan	20,273	73.92	7,153	26.08	1	0.00
Albay	49,826	79.27	13,031	20.73	2	0.00
Antique	25,189	69.61	10,940	30.23	59	0.16
Bacolod	14,656	72.48	5,565	27.52	0	0.00
Baguio	5,251	54.03	4,467	45.97	0	0.00
Basilan	6,138	75.95	1,944	24.05	0	0.00
Bataan	30,166	88.53	3,906	11.46	1	0.00
Batanes	1,630	53.80	1,400	46.20	0	0.00
Batangas	105,050	88.57	13,395	11.29	159	0.13
Bohol	68,879	64.53	37,849	35.46	6	0.01
Bukidnon	11,795	83.97	2,252	16.03	0	0.00
Bulacan	97,816	69.53	42,857	30.47	1	0.00
Butuan	11,801	75.36	3,859	24.64	0	0.00
Cabanatuan	9,098	69.71	3,954	30.29	0	0.00
Cagayan	37,848	60.61	24,595	39.39	0	0.00
Cagayan de Oro	7,754	84.32	1,442	15.68	0	0.00
Calbayog	5,176	45.08	6,307	54.92	0	0.00
Camarines Norte	23,662	72.46	8,990	27.53	2	0.01
Camarines Sur	62,155	65.49	32,749	34.51	3	0.00
Capiz	48,958	58.23	35,118	41.77	0	0.00
Catanduanes	18,793	76.79	5,680	23.21	0	0.00
Cavite	35,363	58.52	25,061	41.47	6	0.01
Cavite City	7,395	76.04	2,330	23.96	0	0.00
Cebu	101,010	61.82	62,389	38.18	2	0.00
Cebu City	31,317	78.04	8,813	21.96	0	0.00
Cotabato	60,085	72.76	22,489	27.23	5	0.01
Dagupan	8,401	60.37	5,514	39.63	0	0.00
Dansalan	2,800	46.38	3,237	53.62	0	0.00
Davao	46,021	78.65	12,495	21.35	0	0.00
Davao City	25,424	80.03	6,323	19.90	22	0.07
Dumaguete	5,084	79.14	1,339	20.84	1	0.02
Iligan	5,698	71.45	2,277	28.55	0	0.00
Ilocos Norte	25,082	42.33	34,162	57.66	4	0.01
Ilocos Sur	17,689	23.67	57,051	76.33	0	0.00
Iloilo	146,560	82.08	31,993	17.92	3	0.00
Iloilo City	24,866	81.26	5,736	18.74	0	0.00
Isabela	35,094	59.28	24,100	40.71	2	0.00
La Union	14,108	25.02	42,267	74.97	2	0.00
Laguna	73,816	83.85	14,155	16.08	64	0.07
Lanao	39,980	51.59	37,450	48.33	60	0.08
Legazpi	10,020	67.66	4,790	32.34	0	0.00
Leyte	101,900	64.68	55,646	35.32	2	0.00
Lipa	11,304	83.78	2,185	16.19	4	0.03
Manila	180,328	80.39	43,953	19.59	34	0.02
Marinduque	17,019	86.42	2,675	13.58	0	0.00
Masbate	27,622	70.82	11,375	29.17	4	0.01
Misamis Occidental	23,600	71.06	9,612	28.94	0	0.00
Misamis Oriental	34,297	78.90	9,171	21.10	0	0.00
Mountain Province	35,488	69.34	15,688	30.65	6	0.01
Naga	6,104	76.31	1,894	23.68	1	0.01
Negros Occidental	88,257	71.54	35,115	28.46	1	0.00
Negros Oriental	36,718	62.97	21,594	37.03	1	0.00
Nueva Ecija	58,945	58.81	41,283	41.19	6	0.01
Nueva Vizcaya	13,206	61.47	8,277	38.53	1	0.00
Occidental Mindoro	9,462	67.41	4,574	32.59	0	0.00
Oriental Mindoro	29,843	85.11	5,219	14.89	0	0.00
Ormoc	4,057	41.25	5,778	58.75	0	0.00
Ozamiz	6,417	78.00	1,810	22.00	0	0.00
Palawan	13,438	62.54	8,047	37.45	1	0.00
Pampanga	86,623	81.48	19,682	18.51	2	0.00
Pangasinan	121,948	55.34	98,395	44.65	8	0.00
Pasay	18,776	70.20	7,958	29.75	12	0.04
Quezon	97,398	87.76	13,567	12.22	21	0.02
Quezon City	32,110	71.86	12,564	28.12	9	0.02
Rizal	135,349	81.29	30,965	18.60	191	0.11
Romblon	12,016	57.63	8,833	42.37	0	0.00
Roxas	4,624	50.79	4,480	49.21	0	0.00
Samar	67,364	63.32	39,017	36.68	2	0.00
San Pablo	12,075	78.20	3,359	21.75	7	0.05
Sorsogon	40,273	65.30	21,399	34.70	2	0.00
Sulu	11,523	55.18	9,359	44.81	2	0.01
Surigao	37,638	66.86	18,653	33.14	1	0.00
Tacloban	6,979	67.79	3,316	32.21	0	0.00
Tagaytay	602	92.62	48	7.38	0	0.00
Tarlac	55,966	67.11	27,428	32.89	3	0.00
Zambales	39,015	95.30	1,924	4.70	1	0.00
Zamboanga City	11,480	75.32	3,762	24.68	0	0.00
Zamboanga del Norte	19,526	67.84	9,257	32.16	0	0.00
Zamboanga del Sur	18,660	69.91	8,033	30.09	0	0.00
Total	2,912,992	68.90	1,313,991	31.08	736	0.02
Source: Commission on Elections

=== Vice-President ===
Garcia also carried the provinces who voted for Magsaysay except for Isabela, Capiz and Sulu who voted for Yulo. The provinces who voted for President Quirino also voted for Yulo.

Candidate	Party	Votes	%
Carlos P. Garcia	Nacionalista Party	2,515,265	62.90
José Yulo	Liberal Party	1,483,802	37.10
Total		3,999,067	100.00
Valid votes		3,999,067	92.43
Invalid/blank votes		327,639	7.57
Total votes		4,326,706	100.00
Registered voters/turnout		5,603,231	77.22
Source: Nohlen, Grotz, Hartmann, Hasall and Santos

Popular vote
Garcia	62.90%
Yulo	37.10%

Province/City	Garcia		Yulo	
Province/City	Votes	%	Votes	%
Abra	6,102	26.35	17,054	73.65
Agusan	19,292	73.21	7,058	26.79
Albay	38,139	65.77	19,847	34.23
Antique	19,148	54.53	15,966	45.47
Bacolod	11,880	60.04	7,906	39.96
Baguio	4,296	45.06	5,239	54.94
Basilan	5,502	72.41	2,096	27.59
Bataan	23,824	80.29	5,848	19.71
Batanes	1,053	39.34	1,624	60.66
Batangas	90,534	85.96	14,790	14.04
Bohol	73,384	69.32	32,481	30.68
Bukidnon	10,966	80.80	2,605	19.20
Bulacan	83,585	64.48	46,035	35.52
Butuan	11,165	73.23	4,081	26.77
Cabanatuan	8,779	69.81	3,796	30.19
Cagayan	32,455	54.64	26,939	45.36
Cagayan de Oro	7,709	85.32	1,326	14.68
Calbayog	4,895	43.57	6,341	56.43
Camarines Norte	20,645	65.84	10,712	34.16
Camarines Sur	54,074	59.79	36,368	40.21
Capiz	38,246	47.16	42,857	52.84
Catanduanes	16,842	71.57	6,689	28.43
Cavite	29,566	53.40	25,797	46.60
Cavite City	6,379	68.84	2,887	31.16
Cebu	96,413	61.26	60,964	38.74
Cebu City	30,200	76.96	9,042	23.04
Cotabato	38,444	52.18	35,226	47.82
Dagupan	7,896	57.64	5,804	42.36
Dansalan	2,347	46.61	2,688	53.39
Davao	45,878	80.80	10,905	19.20
Davao City	25,318	81.51	5,745	18.49
Dumaguete	4,583	73.05	1,691	26.95
Iligan	5,697	73.16	2,090	26.84
Ilocos Norte	21,149	40.81	30,668	59.19
Ilocos Sur	15,712	21.78	56,430	78.22
Iloilo	100,988	59.23	69,503	40.77
Iloilo City	20,064	67.26	9,768	32.74
Isabela	27,747	49.11	28,753	50.89
La Union	11,694	21.22	43,409	78.78
Laguna	58,344	72.12	22,559	27.88
Lanao	32,961	53.71	28,410	46.29
Legazpi	8,815	62.18	5,362	37.82
Leyte	96,920	63.96	54,610	36.04
Lipa	10,058	86.46	1,575	13.54
Manila	162,856	73.46	58,825	26.54
Marinduque	15,480	84.75	2,786	15.25
Masbate	19,733	56.34	15,289	43.66
Misamis Occidental	25,213	77.59	7,283	22.41
Misamis Oriental	34,627	83.97	6,610	16.03
Mountain Province	23,575	52.51	21,317	47.49
Naga	5,302	69.09	2,372	30.91
Negros Occidental	70,748	59.84	47,483	40.16
Negros Oriental	33,111	58.56	23,435	41.44
Nueva Ecija	59,910	59.13	41,406	40.87
Nueva Vizcaya	11,604	55.28	9,389	44.72
Occidental Mindoro	7,109	55.31	5,745	44.69
Oriental Mindoro	24,924	79.96	6,247	20.04
Ormoc	3,555	37.15	6,014	62.85
Ozamiz	6,419	79.90	1,615	20.10
Palawan	12,250	58.67	8,630	41.33
Pampanga	69,778	73.12	25,651	26.88
Pangasinan	109,887	50.96	105,756	49.04
Pasay	18,508	67.78	8,797	32.22
Quezon	79,349	77.68	22,805	22.32
Quezon City	28,831	65.81	14,979	34.19
Rizal	118,409	75.04	39,375	24.96
Romblon	10,873	53.66	9,390	46.34
Roxas	3,653	41.43	5,164	58.57
Samar	58,772	58.36	41,938	41.64
San Pablo	10,267	74.45	3,524	25.55
Sorsogon	34,223	58.73	24,044	41.27
Sulu	7,373	48.32	7,885	51.68
Surigao	38,868	71.11	15,789	28.89
Tacloban	6,470	64.59	3,547	35.41
Tagaytay	558	92.23	47	7.77
Tarlac	45,247	59.31	31,039	40.69
Zambales	34,435	90.23	3,729	9.77
Zamboanga City	11,001	74.32	3,802	25.68
Zamboanga del Norte	19,452	69.96	8,353	30.04
Zamboanga del Sur	19,207	75.04	6,388	24.96
Total	2,515,265	62.90	1,483,802	37.10
Source: Commission on Elections

== See also ==
- 1953 Philippine Senate election
- 1953 Philippine House of Representatives elections
- Commission on Elections
- Politics of the Philippines
- Philippine elections
- President of the Philippines
- 3rd Congress of the Philippines
