= Democratic Party (Philippines) =

Political party founded by Carlos P. Romulo merged with Nacionalista Party

- Founders: Carlos P. Romulo; Fernando Lopez
- Founded: May 29, 1953
- Dissolved: 1957
- Split from: Liberal
- Merged into: Nacionalista

The Democratic Party was a political party in the Philippines in 1953 to 1957. The party was not related to the Democratic Party of the United States, Democrata Party, and Democratic Party of the Philippines.

== History ==
Liberal Party members, led by Carlos P. Romulo quit the party after the failure of getting the nomination against the incumbent President Elpidio Quirino for the 1953 elections. Romulo and his men founded the Democratic Party, on May 29, 1953. Romulo was nominated by the party, with selection of incumbent Vice President Fernando Lopez as his running mate.

The party fielded candidates for the 1953 general election, however, its presidential candidate Romulo withdrew. After he withdrew, his running mate Lopez also withdrew to run in the Senate election instead. The two withdrew to support Ramon Magsaysay's candidacy. Lopez and Ruperto Kangleon both won in the senatorial election, with Lopez topping the race, placing second.

The Democrats would later merge into the Nacionalista Party.

== Electoral performance ==
The party participated in the 1953 and 1955 elections.

=== Presidential and vice presidential elections ===
Year	Presidential election			Vice presidential election		
Year	Candidate	Vote share	Result	Candidate	Vote share	Result
1953	None (Note: Carlos P. Romulo withdrew. Supported Ramon Magsaysay of Nacionalista Party.)		Ramon Magsaysay (Nacionalista)	None (Note: Fernando Lopez withdrew)		Carlos P. Garcia (Nacionalista)

=== Congress ===
Senate election	Votes	%	Senate seats	+/–	Senate Result	House election	Votes	%	House Seats	+/–	House Result
1953	3,793,654	15.4%	2 / 24	▲2	Won	1953 (Note: Two of the seats were from a common Nacionalista-Democratic ticket.)	342,889	8.4	11 / 102	▲11	Won; Joined the Majority Bloc
1955	Did not contest					1953	342,889	8.4	11 / 102	▲11	Won; Joined the Majority Bloc
1957	Did not contest					1957	42,890	0.9	0 / 102	▼11	Lost

== Notable Members ==
=== Cabinet Level ===
- Carlos P. Romulo, a presidential prospect in 1953, general, and a statesman

=== Senate ===
- Fernando Lopez, topnotcher of the 1953 senatorial elections, former Vice President
- Ruperto Kangleon, last in the ranking of winners of the 1953 senatorial elections, a World War II hero

=== House of Representatives ===
==== Full Democratic members ====
- Pedro G. Trono (Iloilo 1st)
- Ricardo Ladrido (Iloilo 4th)
- Jose M. Aldeguer (Iloilo 5th)
- Ramon P. Mitra (Mountain Province 2nd)
- Jose Puey (Negros Occidental 2nd)
- Carlos Hilado (Negros Occidental 3rd)
- Conrado M. Morente (Oriental Mindoro At-large)
- Serafin Salvador (Rizal 2nd)
- Jose Roy (Tarlac 1st)

==== Partnered with Nacionalista ====
- Ramon M. Durano (Cebu 1st)
- Domingo Veloso (Leyte 2nd)
