= Santiago Lucero (congressman) =

Filipino Visayan lawyer, politician and judge

The Honourable Santiago Lucero
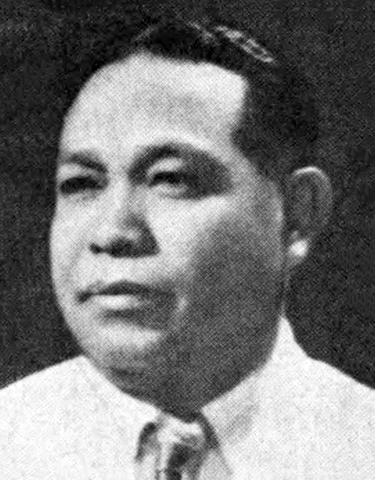
- Lucero official portrait during the 3rd Congress.

Member of the House of Representatives for Cebu's 6th district
- In office December 30, 1953 – March 1, 1956
- Preceded by: Manuel Zosa
- Succeeded by: Manuel Zosa

Mayor of Ronda, Cebu
- In office 1934–1936
- Preceded by: Fermin Lucero
- Succeeded by: Honorato Villalon

Personal details
- Born: May 23, 1904 Ronda, Cebu, Philippine Islands
- Party: Liberal
- Relations: Felicisimo Lucero; Fermin Lucero
- Parent(s): Aquilino Lucero; Brigida Villagonzalo
- Education: Philippine Law School; University of Manila

Santiago Villagonzalo Lucero (May 23, 1904, date of death unknown) was a Filipino Visayan lawyer, politician and judge from Cebu, Philippines. He was mayor of the municipality of Ronda (1934–1936) and member of the House of Representatives for Cebu's 6th legislative district (1954–1956).

== Early life ==
Santiago V. Lucero was the son of Aquilino Lucero and Brigida Villagonzalo. He was born in Ronda, Cebu on May 23, 1904. He attended at the University of Manila's College of Liberal Arts, obtaining an associate in arts degree. Then in 1934, he acquired a law degree from the Philippine Law School, and on December 11, 1934, he was admitted to the Philippine Bar. Like his father, he and his siblings Felicisimo and Fermin would become mayor of Ronda. Santiago married Catalina Mercado who inherited her family's ancestral house in Carcar that was declared a heritage house by Ambeth Ocampo, chair of the National Historical Commission of the Philippines on May 28, 2010.

== Career ==
Santiago Lucero was a municipal clerk in Ronda in 1929 to 1930 and in 1932, he was a Senate clerk for a year. He then became municipal president (equivalent of mayor) of Ronda from 1934 until 1936, succeeding Fermin Lucero, his brother. He would later be replaced by Honorato Villalon.

Later, he was appointed Justice of Peace for the municipality of Carcar in 1936–1942, and Probation Office of the province of Cebu from 1946 to 1948. His appointment as the Assistant Provincial Fiscal of Cebu was made on July 18, 1948 by then President Elpidio Quirino, and he served in this post until 1953.

Running as a candidate of the Liberal Party, he was voted member of the House of Representatives of the 3rd Congress of the Republic, representing the 6th legislative district of Cebu from 1954 until 1956. As a congressman, he was member of the Committees on Codification of Laws, Judiciary, Mines and National Language.
