= Pedro Lopez (legislator) =

Filipino Visayan lawyer, writer, and legislator from Cebu, Philippines

The Honourable Pedro T. Lopez
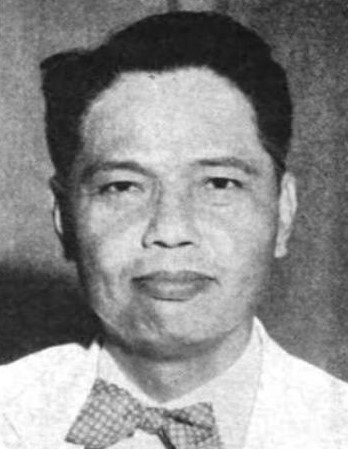

Member of the House of Representatives from Cebu's 2nd District
- In office December 30, 1953 – March 17, 1957
- Preceded by: Leandro A. Tojong
- Succeeded by: Sergio Osmena Jr.
- In office June 9, 1945 – May 25, 1946
- Preceded by: Hilario Abellana
- Succeeded by: Vicente Logarta

Personal details
- Born: January 16, 1906 Cebu, Cebu, Philippine Islands
- Died: March 17, 1957 (aged 51) Balamban, Cebu, Philippines
- Party: Nacionalista
- Education: University of the Philippines
- Profession: Lawyer; Publisher

Pedro T. Lopez (January 16, 1906 – March 17, 1957) was a Filipino Visayan lawyer, writer, and legislator from Cebu, Philippines. He founded the Cebuano periodical Nasud (Nation), elected as Congressman during the 1st Congress of the Commonwealth in 1945, and member of the 3rd Congress of the Republic for Cebu's 2nd district (1953 – 1957). In 1946, he was appointed to the Philippine Rehabilitation Commission, delegate to the first United Nations General Assembly, and associate prosecutor International Military Tribunal for the Far East.

== Early life ==
Pedro T. Lopez was born in the then-town of Cebu and cousin of congressman Paulino Gullas. He graduated from University of the Philippines and became a lawyer in 1929.

== Career ==
He first started his career in journalism, working for various newspapers in Manila. He was the founder, publisher, and editor of the magazine Nasud (Nation) which saw print for the first time on December 11, 1929. It promoted creative writing in Cebuano language and continued its circulation until 1941. Its editors included Florentino D. Tecson, Eugeniano O. Perez, Tomas Violanda, Vicente C. Padriga, Ramon Abellanosa, and Leodegario Salazar. He was the president of the Cebu Press Association. Additionally, he practiced law and was a well-known corporate lawyer. He led the Cebu Lawyers' League as president.

He was elected as member of the 1st Congress of the Commonwealth representing Cebu's 2nd district in 1941; he would serve his term only beginning in 1945. During World War II, he was commanded to serve the Japanese colonizers as mayor of Cebu City; instead, he escaped to Bohol and participated in the resistance movement.

After the war in 1945, then President Sergio Osmeña appointed him as part of the Philippine Rehabilitation Commission and in 1946, he was appointed as delegate to the first United Nations General Assembly and as Philippine Associate Prosecutor of the International Military Tribunal for the Far East held in Tokyo to investigate war crimes committed by the Japanese during the war. He testified to the atrocities committed by General Tomoyuxi Yamashita, claiming that a thousand Filipino civilians were murdered by the Japanese Imperial Army in November 1944.

== Later years ==
He was elected as member of the 3rd Congress of the Republic as an independent candidate on November 10, 1953. A member of the Committee on Anti-Filipino Activities, Committee on Chartered Cities, Committee on Revision of Laws, and Committee on Labor and Industrial Relations, he supported the bill that would mandate Jose Rizal's novels, Noli Me Tangere and El Filibusterismo, as required reading in school, a legislation that was opposed by the Catholic clergy.

He died together with President Ramon Magsaysay when their plane, a Douglas C-47, crashed in Balamban, Cebu on March 17, 1957.

== Historical commemoration ==
- Formerly known as Carmelo Street, the Pedro Lopez Street is named after him by virtue of City Ordinance No. 378.
