= 3rd Congress of the Philippines =

20th legislative term of the Philippines

←	2nd	4th	→
- Old Legislative Building (c. 1988)

Overview
- Term: January 25, 1954 – December 10, 1957
- President: Ramon Magsaysay (until March 17, 1957); Carlos P. Garcia (from March 18, 1957)
- Vice President: Carlos P. Garcia (until March 18, 1957)

Senate
- Members: 24
- President: Eulogio Rodriguez
- President pro tempore: Manuel Briones
- Majority leader: Cipriano Primicias Sr.
- Minority leader: Lorenzo Tañada

House of Representatives
- Members: 102
- Speaker: Jose Laurel Jr.
- Speaker pro tempore: Daniel Romualdez
- Majority leader: Arturo Tolentino
- Minority leader: Eugenio Perez (until August 4, 1957)

The 3rd Congress of the Philippines (Filipino: Ikatlong Kongreso ng Pilipinas), composed of the Philippine Senate and House of Representatives, met from January 25, 1954, until December 10, 1957, during the 39-month presidency of Ramon Magsaysay and the first nine months of Carlos P. García's presidency.

== Sessions ==
- First Regular Session: January 25 – May 20, 1954
- First Special Session: July 19 – August 3, 1954
- Second Regular Session: January 24 – May 19, 1955
- Second Special Session: July 7 – August 10, 1955
- Third Regular Session: January 23 – May 17, 1956
- Third Special Session: June 21 – July 25, 1956
- Fourth Regular Session: January 28, 1957 – May 23, 1957
- Joint Session: December 10, 1957

== Legislation ==
The Third Congress passed a total of 1,077 laws. (Republic Act Nos. 973 – 2049)

== Leadership ==
=== Senate ===
Senate President

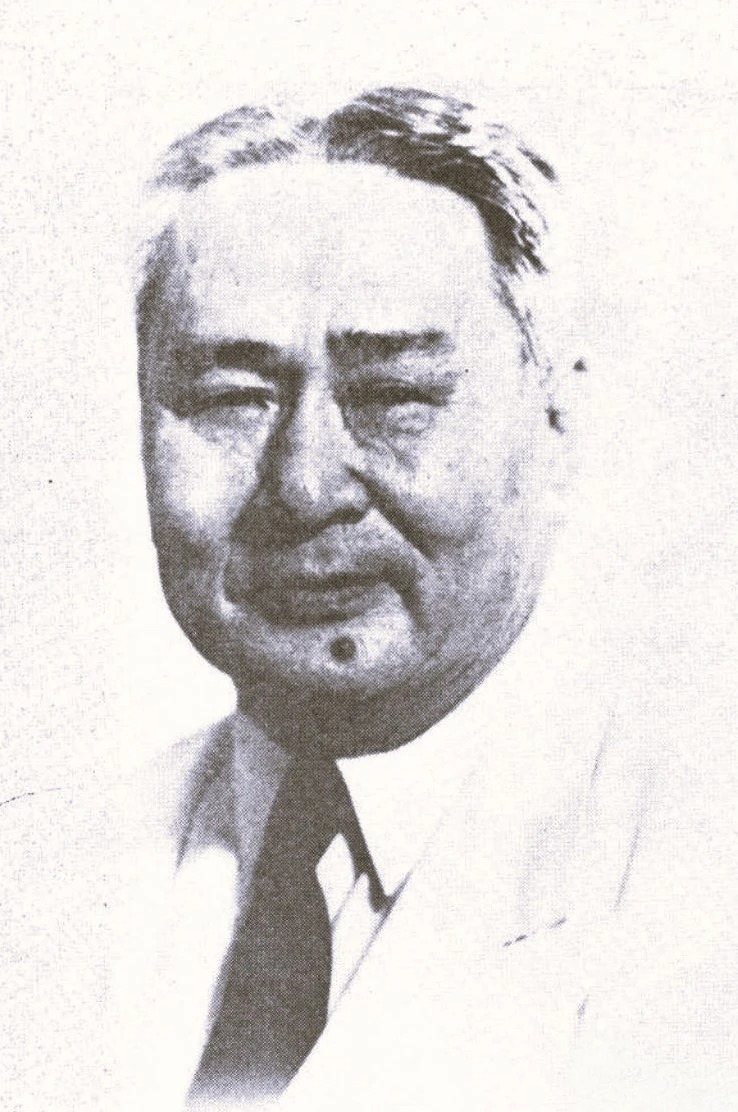
Eulogio Rodriguez

- President: Eulogio Rodriguez (Nacionalista)
- President pro tempore: Manuel Briones (Nacionalista)
- Majority Floor Leader: Cipriano Primicias Sr. (Nacionalista)
- Minority Floor Leader: Lorenzo Tañada (Citizens)

=== House of Representatives ===
House Speaker

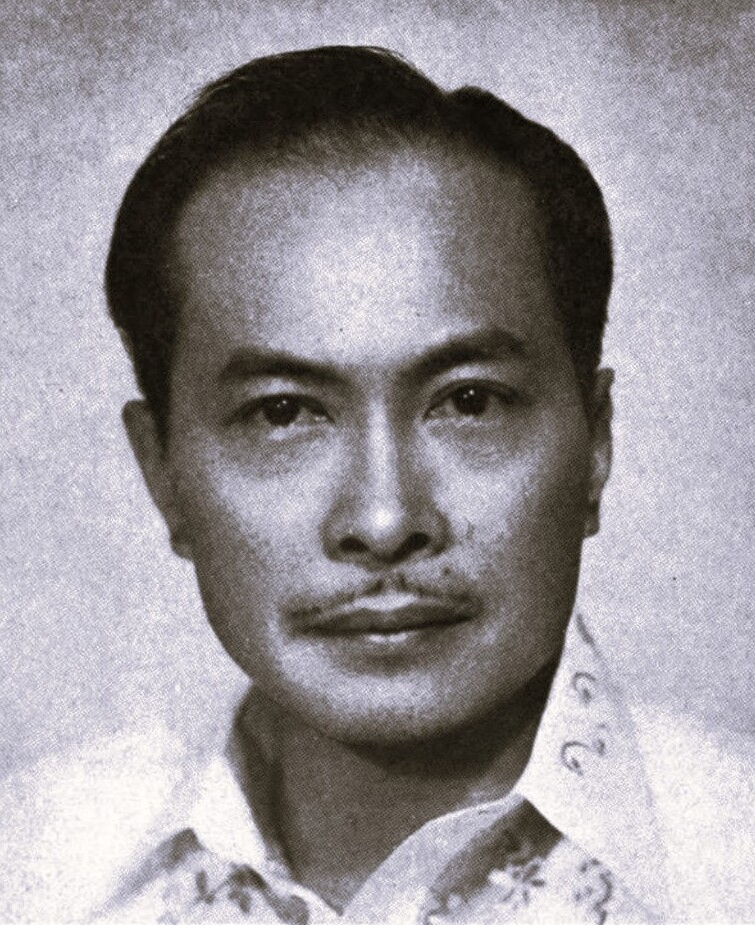
Jose Laurel Jr.

- Speaker: Jose Laurel Jr. (Batangas–3rd, Nacionalista)
- Speaker pro tempore: Daniel Romualdez (Leyte–4th, Nacionalista)
- Majority Floor Leader: Arturo Tolentino (Manila–3rd, Nacionalista)
- Minority Floor Leader: Eugenio Perez (Pangasinan–2nd, Liberal) (until August 4, 1957)

== Members ==
=== Senate ===
Composition of the Senate during the 3rd Congress' 1st and 2nd (left), and 3rd & 4th (right) sessions.

The following are the terms of the senators of this Congress, according to the date of election:

- For senators elected on November 8, 1949: December 30, 1949 – December 30, 1955
- For senators elected on November 13, 1951: December 30, 1951 – December 30, 1957
- For senators elected on November 10, 1953: December 30, 1953 – December 30, 1959
- For senators elected on November 8, 1955: December 30, 1955 – December 30, 1961

Senator	Party	Class
Esteban Abada (Note: Esteban Abada died on December 17, 1954.)	Liberal	1955
Domocao Alonto	Nacionalista	1961
Manuel Briones	Nacionalista	1957
Tomas Cabili	Liberal	1955
Edmundo B. Cea	Nacionalista	1959
Mariano Jesus Cuenco	Nacionalista	1959
Francisco Afan Delgado	Nacionalista	1957
Ruperto Kangleon	Democratic	1959
Jose P. Laurel	Nacionalista	1957
Roseller T. Lim (Note: Roseller T. Lim was elected on November 8, 1955, to succeed Carlos P. Garcia, who took office as Vice President of the Philippines on December 30, 1953. He took office on December 30, 1955.)	Nacionalista	1957
Jose Locsin	Nacionalista	1957
Fernando Lopez	Democratic	1959
Alejo Mabanag	Nacionalista	1959
Pacita Madrigal-Warns	Nacionalista	1961
Enrique Magalona	Liberal	1955
Justiniano Montano	Liberal	1955
Quintin Paredes	Nacionalista (Note: Affiliated with the Liberal Party until 1955.)	1955, 1961
Emmanuel Pelaez	Nacionalista	1959
Macario Peralta Jr.	Liberal	1955
Cipriano Primicias Sr.	Nacionalista	1957
Gil Puyat	Nacionalista	1957
Claro M. Recto	Nacionalista	1955, 1961
Soc Rodrigo	Nacionalista	1961
Eulogio Rodriguez	Nacionalista	1959
Decoroso Rosales	Nacionalista	1961
Pedro Sabido	Nacionalista	1961
Lorenzo Sumulong	Nacionalista	1955, 1961
Lorenzo Tañada	Citizens	1959
Jose Zulueta	Nacionalista	1957

=== House of Representatives ===
Composition of the House of Representatives during the 3rd Congress.

House seats by province in the 3rd Congress.

Province/City	District	Representative	Party
Abra	Lone	Lucas P. Paredes	Liberal
Agusan	Lone	Guillermo R. Sanchez	Nacionalista
Albay	1st	Lorenzo P. Ziga (Note: Lorenzo P. Ziga died on November 4, 1954.)	Liberal
Albay	1st	Tecla San Andres Ziga (Note: Tecla San Andres Ziga was elected on November 8, 1955, to succeed Lorenzo P. Ziga.)	Liberal
Albay	2nd	Justino Nuyda	Nacionalista
Albay	3rd	Pio Duran	Nacionalista
Antique	Lone	Tobias Fornier	Nacionalista
Bataan	Lone	Jose R. Nuguid	Nacionalista
Batanes	Lone	Jorge Abad	Liberal
Batangas	1st	Apolinario R. Apacible	Nacionalista
Batangas	2nd	Numeriano U. Babao	Nacionalista
Batangas	3rd	Jose Laurel Jr.	Nacionalista
Bohol	1st	Natalio P. Castillo	Nacionalista
Bohol	2nd	Bartolome Cabangbang	Nacionalista
Bohol	3rd	Esteban Bernido	Nacionalista
Bukidnon	Lone	Cesar M. Fortich	Nacionalista
Bulacan	1st	Erasmo Cruz	Nacionalista
Bulacan	2nd	Rogaciano Mercado	Nacionalista
Cagayan	1st	Felipe R. Garduque Jr.	Nacionalista
Cagayan	2nd	Paulino A. Alonzo	Liberal
Camarines Norte	Lone	Fernando V. Pajarillo	Nacionalista
Camarines Sur	1st	Emilio M. Tible	Nacionalista
Camarines Sur	2nd	Felix Fuentebella	Nacionalista
Capiz	1st	Carmen Dinglasan Consing	Nacionalista
Capiz	2nd	Cornelio Villareal	Liberal
Capiz	3rd	Godofredo P. Ramos	Nacionalista
Catanduanes	Lone	Francisco A. Perfecto	Nacionalista
Cavite	Lone	Jose T. Cajulis	Nacionalista
Cebu	1st	Ramon M. Durano	Nacionalista–Democratic
Cebu	2nd	Pedro Lopez (Note: Pedro Lopez died on March 17, 1957.)	Independent
Cebu	3rd	Maximino Noel	Nacionalista
Cebu	4th	Isidro Kintanar	Nacionalista
Cebu	5th	Miguel Cuenco	Nacionalista
Cebu	6th	Santiago Lucero (Note: Santiago Lucero was removed by the House of Representatives Electoral Tribunal on March 1, 1956, after an electoral protest.)	Liberal
Cebu	6th	Manuel A. Zosa (Note: Manuel A. Zosa replaced Santiago Lucero on March 1, 1956, after an electoral protest.)	Nacionalista
Cebu	7th	Nicolas Escario	Liberal
Cotabato	Lone	Luminog Mangelen	Liberal
Davao	Lone	Ismael L. Veloso	Nacionalista
Ilocos Norte	1st	Antonio Raquiza (Note: Antonio Raquiza was elected as Governor of Ilocos Norte on November 8, 1955.)	Liberal
Ilocos Norte	2nd	Ferdinand Marcos	Liberal
Ilocos Sur	1st	Floro Crisologo	Liberal
Ilocos Sur	2nd	Ricardo Gacula	Liberal
Iloilo	1st	Pedro G. Trono	Democratic
Iloilo	2nd	Rodolfo Ganzon (Note: Rodolfo Ganzon was elected as Mayor of Iloilo City on November 8, 1955.)	Nacionalista
Iloilo	3rd	Ramon C. Tabiana	Liberal
Iloilo	4th	Ricardo Ladrido	Democratic
Iloilo	5th	Jose Aldeguer	Democratic
Isabela	Lone	Samuel Reyes (Note: Samuel Reyes was removed by the House of Representatives Electoral Tribunal on February 14, 1957, after an electoral protest.)	Liberal
Isabela	Lone	Delfin B. Albano (Note: Delfin B. Albano replaced Samuel Reyes on February 14, 1957, after winning an electoral protest.)	Nacionalista
La Union	1st	Francisco Ortega	Nacionalista
La Union	2nd	Manuel T. Cases	Liberal
Laguna	1st	Jacobo Z. Gonzales	Nacionalista
Laguna	2nd	Wenceslao Lagumbay	Nacionalista
Lanao	Lone	Domocao Alonto (Note: Domocao Alonto took office as Senator of the Philippines on December 30, 1955.)	Nacionalista
Lanao	Lone	Mohammad Ali Dimaporo (Note: Mohammad Ali Dimaporo replaced Domocao Alonto on May 21, 1957, after an electoral protest.)	Liberal
Leyte	1st	Carlos Tan	Liberal
Leyte	2nd	Domingo Veloso	Nacionalista–Democratic
Leyte	3rd	Francisco M. Pajao	Liberal
Leyte	4th	Daniel Romualdez	Nacionalista
Leyte	5th	Alberto T. Aguja	Nacionalista
Manila	1st	Angel M. Castaño	Nacionalista
Manila	2nd	Joaquin R. Roces	Nacionalista
Manila	3rd	Arturo Tolentino	Nacionalista
Manila	4th	Augusto S. Francisco	Nacionalista
Marinduque	Lone	Panfilo M. Manguera	Nacionalista
Masbate	Lone	Mateo S. Pecson	Liberal
Misamis Occidental	Lone	William Chiongbian	Liberal
Misamis Oriental	Lone	Ignacio S. Cruz	Nacionalista
Mountain Province	1st	Juan Bondad	Nacionalista
Mountain Province	2nd	Ramon P. Mitra	Democratic
Mountain Province	3rd	Luis Hora	Nacionalista
Negros Occidental	1st	Jose Puey	Democratic
Negros Occidental	2nd	Carlos Hilado	Democratic
Negros Occidental	3rd	Agustin M. Gatuslao	Nacionalista
Negros Oriental	1st	Lorenzo Teves	Nacionalista
Negros Oriental	2nd	Lamberto L. Macias	Nacionalista
Nueva Ecija	1st	Jose O. Corpus	Liberal
Nueva Ecija	2nd	Celestino C. Juan	Nacionalista
Nueva Vizcaya	Lone	Leonardo B. Perez	Nacionalista
Occidental Mindoro	Lone	Felipe S. Abeleda	Liberal
Oriental Mindoro	Lone	Conrado M. Morente	Democratic
Palawan	Lone	Gaudencio E. Abordo	Nacionalista
Pampanga	1st	Diosdado Macapagal	Liberal
Pampanga	2nd	Emilio P. Cortez	Nacionalista
Pangasinan	1st	Mario Bengson	Nacionalista
Pangasinan	2nd	Eugenio Perez (Note: Eugenio Perez died on August 4, 1957.)	Liberal
Pangasinan	3rd	Jose D. Parayno	Liberal
Pangasinan	4th	Amadeo J. Perez	Liberal
Pangasinan	5th	Justino Benito	Liberal
Quezon	1st	Manuel S. Enverga	Nacionalista
Quezon	2nd	Leon Guinto Jr.	Nacionalista
Rizal	1st	Eulogio Rodriguez Jr.	Nacionalista
Rizal	2nd	Serafin Salvador	Democratic
Romblon	Lone	Florencio Moreno	Nacionalista
Samar	1st	Gregorio B. Tan (Note: Gregorio B. Tan died on November 4, 1954.)	Nacionalista
Samar	1st	Eladio T. Balite (Note: Eladio T. Balite was elected on November 8, 1955, to succeed Gregorio B. Tan.)	Nacionalista
Samar	2nd	Marciano Lim	Nacionalista
Samar	3rd	Gregorio B. Abogado	Liberal
Sorsogon	1st	Salvador R. Encinas	Liberal
Sorsogon	2nd	Vicente Peralta	Nacionalista
Sulu	Lone	Ombra Amilbangsa	Liberal
Surigao	Lone	Reynaldo P. Honrado	Nacionalista
Tarlac	1st	Jose Roy	Democratic
Tarlac	2nd	Constancio Castañeda	Nacionalista
Zambales	Lone	Enrique Corpus	Nacionalista
Zamboanga del Norte	Lone	Alberto Ubay	Liberal
Zamboanga del Sur	Lone	Roseller T. Lim (Note: Roseller T. Lim took office as Senator of the Philippines on December 30, 1955.)	Nacionalista

== See also ==
- Congress of the Philippines
- Senate of the Philippines
- House of Representatives of the Philippines
- 1953 Philippine general election
- 1955 Philippine general election
