= Deputy Speaker of the House of Representatives of the Philippines =

- Depyuti Ispiker ng Kapulungan ng mga Kinatawan ng Pilipinas
- Seal of the House of Representatives of the Philippines

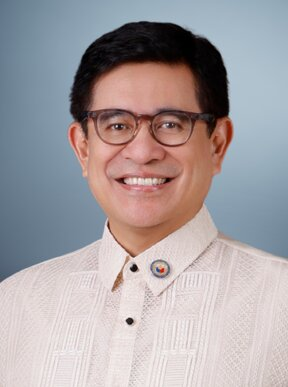
Dinand Hernandez; Senior Deputy Speaker

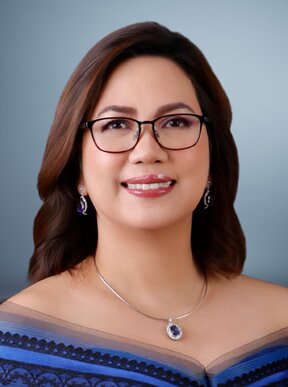
Janette Garin

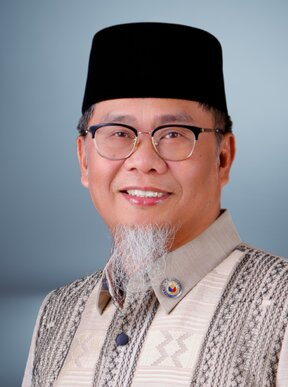
Yasser Balindong

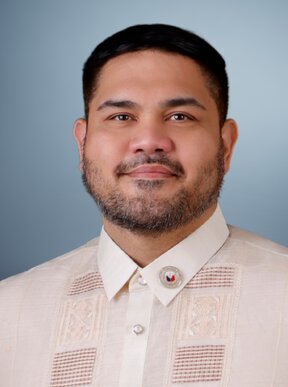
Paolo Ortega

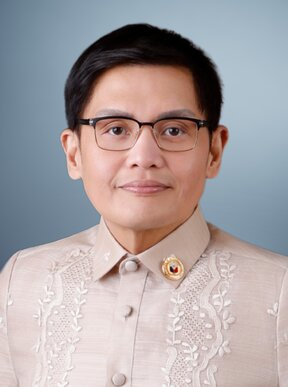
Jay Khonghun

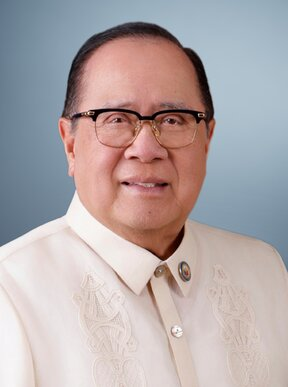
Ronaldo Puno

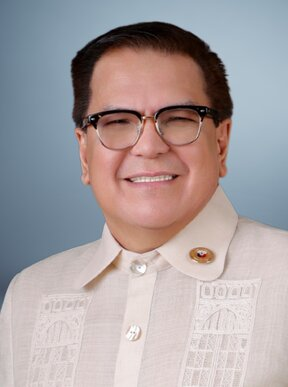
Ferjenel Biron

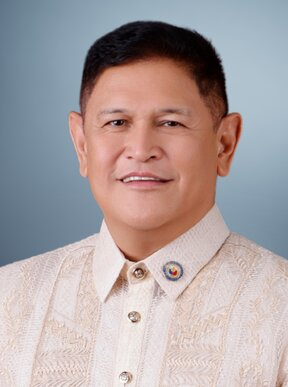
Raymond Mendoza

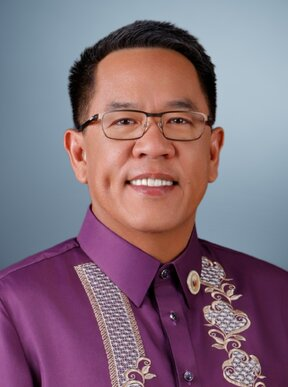
Yevgeny Emano

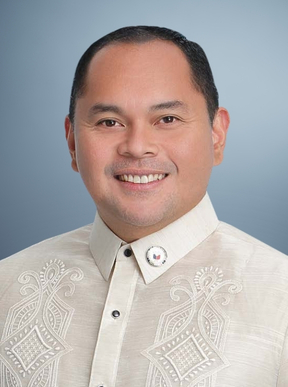
David Suarez

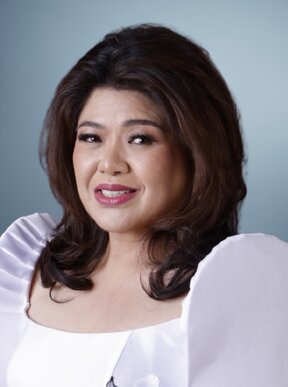
Maria Rachel Arenas

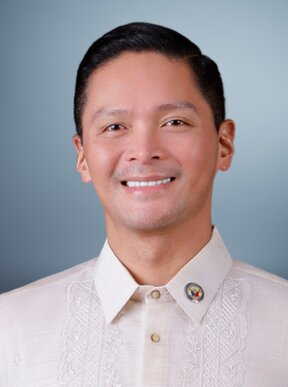
Duke Frasco

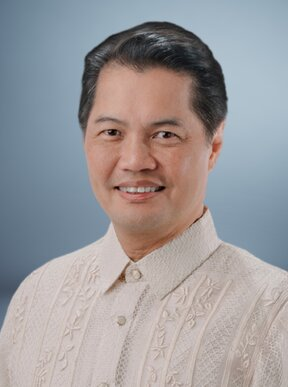
Albee Benitez

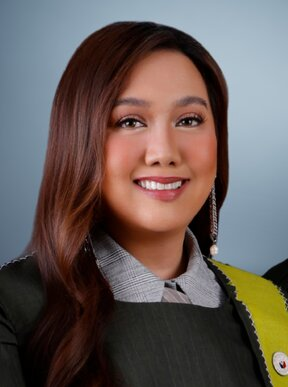
Mercedes Alvarez–Lansang
Incumbent
Multiple
since August 3, 2026 (Note: The following are the dates of election of the incumbent deputy speakers of the House of Representatives: July 28, 2025: Janette Garin, Yasser Balindong, Paolo Ortega, Jay Khonghun, Ronaldo Puno, Ferjenel Biron, and Raymond Mendoza; August 11, 2025: Yevgeny Emano; November 19, 2025: David Suarez (Note: As deputy speaker; Suarez was previously elected as the senior deputy speaker on July 28, 2025, serving until November 19, 2025.), Dinand Hernandez (Note: As senior deputy speaker; Hernandez was elected as deputy speaker on October 10, 2025, and served until he was promoted to the position of senior deputy speaker on November 19, 2025.); March 18, 2026: Maria Rachel Arenas, Duke Frasco, and Albee Benitez; August 3, 2026: Mercedes Alvarez–Lansang)
- House of Representatives of the Philippines
- Style: Mr. Speaker/Madam Speaker (when presiding); The Honorable (formal)
- Type: Deputy speaker of the lower house
- Member of: House of Representatives of the Philippines
- Seat: Batasang Pambansa Complex, Quezon City
- Appointer: Philippine House of Representatives
- Term length: At the House's pleasure (Note: By convention, the deputy speakers are incumbent members of the House of Representatives. As such, they are limited to three consecutive terms of three years each (Article VI, Section 7 of the Constitution of the Philippines).)
- Inaugural holder: Antonio de las Alas (as speaker pro tempore); Hernando Perez; Raul Daza; Simeon Datumanong (as deputy speakers)
- Formation: 1922; 104 years ago (as speaker pro tempore); 1995; 31 years ago (as deputy speakers)

The deputy speakers of the House of Representatives of the Philippines (Filipino: Mga Depyuti Ispiker ng Kapulungan ng mga Kinatawan ng Pilipinas) are the second highest-ranking officials of the House of Representatives of the Philippines. During the absence of the House speaker, one of the House deputy speakers will preside over a session of the chamber.

The positions of deputy speakers were established in the 10th Congress, replacing the single office of speaker pro tempore, which existed from 1922 to 1995.

The 14 incumbent deputy speakers of the House are representatives Dinand Hernandez (Senior Deputy Speaker), Janette Garin, Yasser Balindong, Paolo Ortega, Jay Khonghun, Ronaldo Puno, Ferjenel Biron, Raymond Mendoza, Yevgeny Emano, David Suarez, Maria Rachel Arenas, Duke Frasco, Albee Benitez, and Mercedes Alvarez–Lansang.

== Election and incumbency ==
The House elects its deputy speakers by a majority vote of the members present, provided there is a quorum, either at the opening of a new Congress every three years, after a general election, or when a vacancy occurs.

In the event of the death, resignation, or permanent incapacity of any deputy speaker, the speaker of the House may designate an acting deputy speaker.

== Duties and powers ==
The duties and powers of the House deputy speakers, as contained in Rule V, Section 17 of the House rules, are the following:

- to assume the duties and powers of the speaker when so chosen by a majority vote or by lot among themselves, as the case may be, in cases of absence or temporary incapacity of the speaker, until such time that the speaker returns to office and resumes work; and, in case of resignation, removal, permanent incapacity or death of the speaker, until such time that a new speaker is elected and qualified;
- to preside over the session when, even if present, the speaker does not preside, or has not designated any other member as temporary presiding officer as provided in Section 15(h) of Rule IV;
- to monitor, coordinate and facilitate action on measures filed, requests, and other concerns of members representing constituencies to which they may be assigned by the speaker;
- to recommend to the speaker appropriate policies, strategies and programs of action to improve the process of legislation and the quality of legislative measures, and to effectively address concerns of members on matters affecting them, their constituencies, and the overall operations and integrity of the House;
- to appoint personnel of the House when so authorized by the speaker; and
- to perform such other duties and functions as may be assigned or delegated to them by the speaker.

Prior to the creation of the deputy speakerships in 1995, Batas Pambansa No. 882, enacted on December 9, 1985, provided that the speaker pro tempore of the Batasang Pambansa would act as president in the event of the deputy prime minister's inability to do so during vacancies in the offices of the prime minister, the speaker of the Batasan, and the president of the Philippines, prior to the presidential election supposed to take place in 1987. Upon the ratification of the 1987 Constitution, only the president of the Senate and the speaker of the House were included in the presidential line of succession.

== History ==
=== Vice president of the Malolos Congress ===
In 1898, the short-lived Malolos Congress elected Benito Legarda as its vice president, serving as deputy to president Pedro Paterno. This was the first known instance of a deputy presiding officer elected by a national legislative body in the Philippines.

=== Speaker pro tempore ===
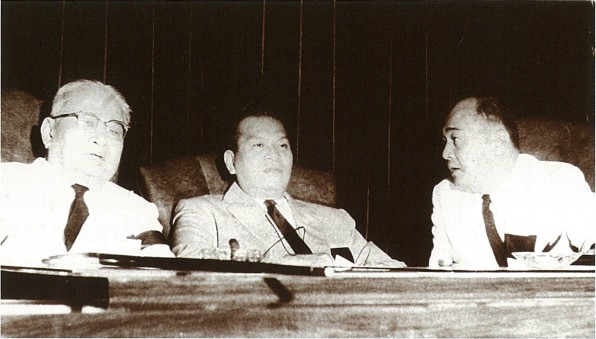
Speaker pro tempore Daniel Romualdez (right) with Senate president Eulogio Rodriguez (left) during the second State of the Nation Address of president Ramon Magsaysay (center)

After the Jones Law was enacted to serve as the interim constitution of the Philippines, an elected House of Representatives served as the lower house of the bicameral Congress. The House elected Antonio de las Alas as its first speaker pro tempore during the 6th Philippine Legislature. The position then became vacant until Quintín Paredes was elected in 1928. Jose Zulueta was the last speaker pro tempore before the abolition of Congress in 1935 but was subsequently elected to the same position in the unicameral National Assembly. Amendments adopted in 1940 to the 1935 Constitution restored the bicameral legislature the following year, in 1941.

Prospero Sanidad was elected speaker pro tempore of the reestablished House in the first Commonwealth Congress. Shifting leadership between the Nacionalista and Liberal parties in subsequent Congresses led to speakers pro tempore from different parties being elected to the position until 1972. Francisco Ortega, a member of the Liberal Party, became the speaker pro tempore after the party gained a majority in the House after the 1946 elections. At the start of the 3rd Congress, Daniel Romualdez was elected speaker pro tempore. He was succeeded by Constancio Castañeda in the 4th Congress after Jose Laurel Jr. resigned the speakership to run for vice president in the 1957 elections and Romualdez was elected speaker. Jose Aldeguer served as the last speaker pro tempore of the House before Congress was dissolved when President Ferdinand Marcos declared martial law and assumed legislative powers.

The position was revived when the unicameral Batasang Pambansa, established in 1978, elected Blah T. Sinsuat as speaker pro tempore of the Interim Batasan in November 1981. Salipada Pendatun, who had previously served as speaker pro tempore from 1962 to 1965, was reelected to the position in 1984 in the Regular Batasang Pambansa and served until his death in 1985, when he was succeeded by Macacuna Dimaporo. The Batasan was later abolished with the signing of Proclamation No. 3 by President Corazon Aquino, known as the “Freedom Constitution.”

The 1987 Constitution restored the bicameral Congress, with the House of Representatives as its lower chamber. Antonio Cuenco and Raul Daza served as speakers pro tempore of the House during the 8th and 9th Congresses, respectively.

=== Deputy speakerships ===
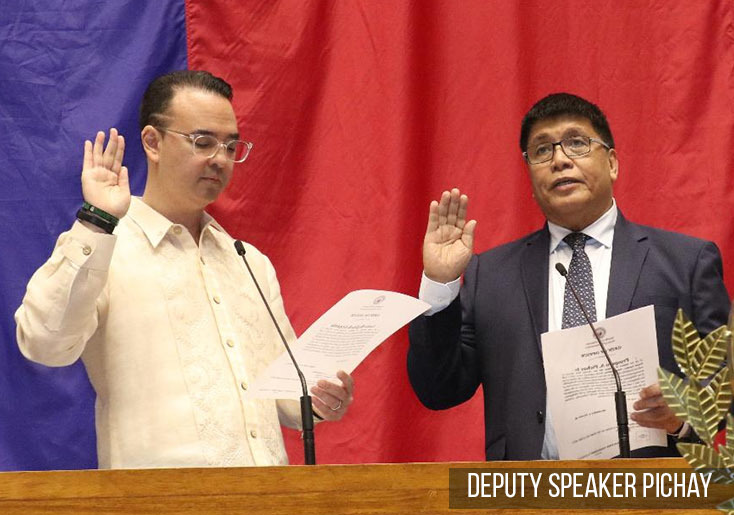
House speaker Alan Peter Cayetano (left) swears in Surigao del Sur's 1st district representative Prospero Pichay Jr. (right) as deputy speaker on July 27, 2019

In 1995, the position of speaker pro tempore was replaced by deputy speakerships, wherein three representatives, one from the island groups of Luzon, Visayas, and Mindanao, would serve concurrently and in rotation to preside over the chamber during the speaker's absence. Hernando Perez, Raul Daza, and Simeon Datumanong were elected in the 10th Congress as the first deputy speakers for Luzon, Visayas, and Mindanao, respectively. The House then elected six deputy speakers, now representing the chamber at-large, from 2010 to 2016.

In the 17th Congress, the number of deputy speakers was increased to 12 in anticipation of a shift to federalism, with each deputy speaker supposed to represent a potential federal state. Several additional deputy speakers were eventually elected, and following the election of Lord Allan Velasco as speaker in 2020, 12 more were added, bringing the total to 32, the highest in the House's history. A senior deputy speaker was also designated from among the deputy speakers. The position is largely ceremonial and carries no additional responsibilities.

The number was reduced in the 19th Congress, with the election of only 9 deputy speakers.

== List of senior deputy speakers ==
Portrait	Name (Birth–Death)	Term of office		Party	Speaker	Legislature
Portrait	Name (Birth–Death)	Took office	Left office	Party	Speaker	Legislature
	Paulino Salvador Leachon; Member for Oriental Mindoro–1st (born 1974)	October 14, 2020	June 30, 2022	PDP–Laban	Lord Allan Velasco	18th Congress
	Gloria Macapagal Arroyo; Member for Pampanga–2nd (born 1947)	July 25, 2022	May 17, 2023	Lakas	Martin Romualdez	19th Congress
	Aurelio Gonzales Jr. Member for Pampanga–3rd (born 1962)	May 17, 2023	June 30, 2025	PDP–Laban (until 2023)	Martin Romualdez	19th Congress
	Aurelio Gonzales Jr. Member for Pampanga–3rd (born 1962)	May 17, 2023	June 30, 2025	Lakas (from 2023)	Martin Romualdez	19th Congress
	David Suarez; Member for Quezon–2nd (born 1977)	July 28, 2025	November 19, 2025	Lakas	Martin Romualdez	20th Congress
	David Suarez; Member for Quezon–2nd (born 1977)	July 28, 2025	November 19, 2025	Lakas	Bojie Dy	20th Congress
	Dinand Hernandez; Member for South Cotabato–2nd (born 1966)	November 19, 2025	Incumbent	PFP	Bojie Dy	20th Congress

== List of deputy speakers ==
=== Vice President of the Malolos Congress (1898–1899) ===
Portrait	Name (Birth–Death)	Term of office		Party	President	Legislature
Portrait	Name (Birth–Death)	Took office	Left office	Party	President	Legislature
	Benito Legarda; Member for Sulu (1853–1915)	September 15, 1898	November 13, 1899	Nonpartisan	Pedro Paterno	Malolos Congress

=== Speaker pro tempore of the House of Representatives (1916–1935) ===
Portrait	Name (Birth–Death)	Term of office		Party	Speaker	Legislature
Portrait	Name (Birth–Death)	Took office	Left office	Party	Speaker	Legislature
None (October 16, 1916 – November 13, 1923)					Sergio Osmeña	4th Legislature
None (October 16, 1916 – November 13, 1923)					Sergio Osmeña	5th Legislature
None (October 16, 1916 – November 13, 1923)					Manuel Roxas	6th Legislature
	Antonio de las Alas; Member for Batangas–1st (1889–1983)	November 13, 1923	July 16, 1929	Nacionalista; Colectivista (until 1925)	Manuel Roxas	6th Legislature
	Antonio de las Alas; Member for Batangas–1st (1889–1983)	November 13, 1923	July 16, 1929	Nacionalista Consolidado (from 1925)	Manuel Roxas	7th Legislature
	Antonio de las Alas; Member for Batangas–1st (1889–1983)	November 13, 1923	July 16, 1929	Nacionalista Consolidado (from 1925)	Manuel Roxas	8th Legislature
	Quintín Paredes; Member for Abra–Lone (1884–1973)	July 16, 1929	November 8, 1930	Nacionalista Consolidado	Manuel Roxas	8th Legislature
	Antonio de las Alas; Member for Batangas–1st (1889–1983)	November 8, 1930	January 25, 1933	Nacionalista Consolidado	Manuel Roxas	9th Legislature
	Quintín Paredes; Member for Abra–Lone (1884–1973)	January 25, 1933	July 24, 1933	Nacionalista Consolidado	Manuel Roxas	9th Legislature
	Jose Zulueta; Member for Iloilo–1st (1889–1972)	July 24, 1933	November 25, 1935	Nacionalista Consolidado (until 1934)	Manuel Roxas	9th Legislature
	Jose Zulueta; Member for Iloilo–1st (1889–1972)	July 24, 1933	November 25, 1935	Nacionalista Consolidado (until 1934)	Quintín Paredes	9th Legislature
	Jose Zulueta; Member for Iloilo–1st (1889–1972)	July 24, 1933	November 25, 1935	Nacionalista; Democratico (from 1934)	Quintín Paredes	10th Legislature

=== Speaker pro tempore of the National Assembly (1935–1941) ===
Portrait	Name (Birth–Death)	Term of office		Party	Speaker	Legislature
Portrait	Name (Birth–Death)	Took office	Left office	Party	Speaker	Legislature
	Jose Zulueta; Member for Iloilo–1st (1889–1972)	November 25, 1935	December 30, 1941	Nacionalista Democratico (until 1938)	Gil Montilla	1st National Assembly
	Jose Zulueta; Member for Iloilo–1st (1889–1972)	November 25, 1935	December 30, 1941	Nacionalista (from 1938)	José Yulo	2nd National Assembly

=== Speaker pro tempore of the House of Representatives (1945–1973) ===
Portrait	Name (Birth–Death)	Term of office		Party	Speaker	Legislature
Portrait	Name (Birth–Death)	Took office	Left office	Party	Speaker	Legislature
	Prospero Sanidad; Member for Ilocos Sur–2nd (1897–1969)	June 9, 1945	May 25, 1946	Nacionalista	Jose Zulueta	1st Commonwealth Congress
	Francisco Ortega; Member for La Union–1st (1904–1967)	May 25, 1946	December 30, 1949	Liberal	Eugenio Pérez	2nd Commonwealth Congress
	Francisco Ortega; Member for La Union–1st (1904–1967)	May 25, 1946	December 30, 1949	Liberal	Eugenio Pérez	1st Congress
	Domingo Veloso; Member for Leyte–2nd (1908–1980)	December 30, 1949	December 30, 1953	Liberal	Eugenio Pérez	2nd Congress
	Daniel Romualdez; Member for Leyte–4th (1907–1965)	January 25, 1954	December 30, 1957	Nacionalista	Jose Laurel Jr.	3rd Congress
	Constancio Castañeda; Member for Tarlac–2nd	January 27, 1958	March 8, 1962	Nacionalista	Daniel Romualdez	4th Congress
	Constancio Castañeda; Member for Tarlac–2nd	January 27, 1958	March 8, 1962	Nacionalista	Daniel Romualdez	5th Congress
	Salipada Pendatun; Member for Cotabato–Lone (1912–1985)	March 8, 1962	February 2, 1967	Liberal	Cornelio Villareal	5th Congress
	Salipada Pendatun; Member for Cotabato–Lone (1912–1985)	March 8, 1962	February 2, 1967	Liberal	Cornelio Villareal	6th Congress
	Jose Aldeguer; Member for Iloilo–5th (1908–1991)	February 2, 1967	January 17, 1973	Nacionalista	Jose Laurel Jr.	6th Congress
	Jose Aldeguer; Member for Iloilo–5th (1908–1991)	February 2, 1967	January 17, 1973	Nacionalista	Jose Laurel Jr.	7th Congress
	Jose Aldeguer; Member for Iloilo–5th (1908–1991)	February 2, 1967	January 17, 1973	Nacionalista	Cornelio Villareal	7th Congress

=== Speaker pro tempore of the Batasang Pambansa (1981–1986) ===
Portrait	Name (Birth–Death)	Term of office		Party	Speaker	Legislature
Portrait	Name (Birth–Death)	Took office	Left office	Party	Speaker	Legislature
None (June 12, 1978 – November 10, 1981)					Querube Makalintal	Interim Batasang Pambansa
	Blah T. Sinsuat; Member for Region XII (1908–1984)	November 10, 1981	June 30, 1984	KBL	Querube Makalintal	Interim Batasang Pambansa
	Salipada Pendatun; Member for Maguindanao (1912–1985)	July 23, 1984	January 27, 1985	KBL	Nicanor Yñiguez	Regular Batasang Pambansa
Vacant (January 27 – March 13, 1985)					Nicanor Yñiguez	Regular Batasang Pambansa
	Macacuna Dimaporo; Member for Lanao del Sur	March 13, 1985	March 25, 1986	KBL	Nicanor Yñiguez	Regular Batasang Pambansa

=== Speaker pro tempore of the House of Representatives (1987–1995) ===
Portrait	Name (Birth–Death)	Term of office		Party	Speaker	Legislature
Portrait	Name (Birth–Death)	Took office	Left office	Party	Speaker	Legislature
	Antonio Cuenco; Member for Cebu City–2nd (1936–2020)	July 27, 1987	June 30, 1992	LnB (Panaghiusa) (until 1988)	Ramon Mitra Jr.	8th Congress
	Antonio Cuenco; Member for Cebu City–2nd (1936–2020)	July 27, 1987	June 30, 1992	LDP (Panaghiusa) (from 1988)	Ramon Mitra Jr.	8th Congress
	Raul Daza; Member for Northern Samar–1st (1935–2026)	July 27, 1992	June 30, 1995	Liberal	Jose de Venecia Jr.	9th Congress

=== Deputy Speaker of the House of Representatives (since 1995) ===
This list excludes representatives who have served as senior deputy speakers of the House of Representatives, who are officially included in the overall roster of deputy speakers.
For the list, see list of senior deputy speakers.

Portrait	Name (Birth–Death)	Term of office		Party	Speaker	Legislature
Portrait	Name (Birth–Death)	Took office	Left office	Party	Speaker	Legislature
	Hernando Perez; Member for Batangas–2nd (born 1939)	July 24, 1995	June 30, 1998	Lakas	Jose de Venecia Jr.	10th Congress
	Raul Daza; Member for Northern Samar–1st (1935–2026)	July 24, 1995	June 30, 1998	Liberal	Jose de Venecia Jr.	10th Congress
	Simeon Datumanong; Member for Maguindanao–2nd (1935–2017)	July 24, 1995	June 30, 1998	Lakas	Jose de Venecia Jr.	10th Congress
	Alfredo Abueg Jr. Member for Palawan–2nd (1932–2024)	July 28, 1998	November 22, 2000	LAMMP	Manny Villar (until 2000) Arnulfo Fuentebella (2000–2001) Feliciano Belmonte Jr. (from 2001)	11th Congress
	Eduardo Gullas; Member for Cebu–1st (1930–2025)	July 28, 1998	January 17, 2000	PROMDI	Manny Villar (until 2000) Arnulfo Fuentebella (2000–2001) Feliciano Belmonte Jr. (from 2001)	11th Congress
	Daisy Avance Fuentes; Member for South Cotabato–2nd (born 1957)	July 28, 1998	January 24, 2001	NPC	Manny Villar (until 2000) Arnulfo Fuentebella (2000–2001) Feliciano Belmonte Jr. (from 2001)	11th Congress
	Erico Aumentado; Member for Bohol–2nd (1940–2012)	January 24, 2000	November 22, 2000	Lakas	Manny Villar (until 2000) Arnulfo Fuentebella (2000–2001) Feliciano Belmonte Jr. (from 2001)	11th Congress
	Butz Aquino; Member for Makati–2nd (1939–2015)	November 22, 2000	January 24, 2001	LDP	Manny Villar (until 2000) Arnulfo Fuentebella (2000–2001) Feliciano Belmonte Jr. (from 2001)	11th Congress
	Gerardo Espina Sr. Member for Biliran–Lone (1935–2013)	November 22, 2000	January 24, 2001	NPC	Manny Villar (until 2000) Arnulfo Fuentebella (2000–2001) Feliciano Belmonte Jr. (from 2001)	11th Congress
	Carlos Padilla; Member for Nueva Vizcaya–Lone (1944–2023)	January 24, 2001	June 30, 2001	LDP	Manny Villar (until 2000) Arnulfo Fuentebella (2000–2001) Feliciano Belmonte Jr. (from 2001)	11th Congress
	Raul M. Gonzalez; Member for Iloilo City–Lone (1930–2014)	January 24, 2001	June 30, 2001	Nacionalista	Manny Villar (until 2000) Arnulfo Fuentebella (2000–2001) Feliciano Belmonte Jr. (from 2001)	11th Congress
	Nur Jaafar; Member for Tawi-Tawi–Lone (born 1944)	January 24, 2001	June 30, 2001	LAMMP	Manny Villar (until 2000) Arnulfo Fuentebella (2000–2001) Feliciano Belmonte Jr. (from 2001)	11th Congress
	Emilio Espinosa Jr. Member for Masbate–2nd (1922–2026)	July 23, 2001	June 30, 2004	NPC	Jose de Venecia Jr.	12th Congress
	Raul M. Gonzalez; Member for Iloilo City–Lone (1930–2014)	July 23, 2001	June 30, 2004	Nacionalista	Jose de Venecia Jr.	12th Congress
	Abdulgani Salapuddin; Member for Basilan–Lone (born 1952)	July 23, 2001	June 30, 2004	Lakas	Jose de Venecia Jr.	12th Congress
	Emilio Espinosa Jr. Member for Masbate–2nd (1922–2026)	July 27, 2004	June 30, 2007	NPC	Jose de Venecia Jr.	13th Congress
	Raul del Mar; Member for Cebu City–1st (1941–2020)	July 27, 2004	June 30, 2007	Lakas	Jose de Venecia Jr.	13th Congress
	Abdulgani Salapuddin; Member for Basilan–Lone (born 1952)	July 27, 2004	June 30, 2007	Lakas	Jose de Venecia Jr.	13th Congress
	Benigno Aquino III; Member for Tarlac–2nd (1960–2021)	October 27, 2004	February 21, 2006	Liberal	Jose de Venecia Jr.	13th Congress
	Eric Singson; Member for Ilocos Sur–2nd (born 1948)	February 21, 2006	June 30, 2007	Liberal	Jose de Venecia Jr.	13th Congress
	Simeon Datumanong; Member for Maguindanao–2nd (1935–2017)	July 24, 2007	June 30, 2010	Lakas	Jose de Venecia Jr. (until 2008) Prospero Nograles (from 2008)	14th Congress
	Raul del Mar; Member for Cebu City–1st (1941–2020)	July 24, 2007	June 30, 2010	Lakas	Jose de Venecia Jr. (until 2008) Prospero Nograles (from 2008)	14th Congress
	Arnulfo Fuentebella; Member for Camarines Sur–3rd (1945–2020)	July 24, 2007	June 30, 2010	NPC	Jose de Venecia Jr. (until 2008) Prospero Nograles (from 2008)	14th Congress
	Eric Singson; Member for Ilocos Sur–2nd (born 1948)	July 24, 2007	June 30, 2010	Liberal	Jose de Venecia Jr. (until 2008) Prospero Nograles (from 2008)	14th Congress
	Girlie Villarosa; Member for Occidental Mindoro–Lone (1943–2021)	August 13, 2007	June 30, 2010	Lakas	Jose de Venecia Jr. (until 2008) Prospero Nograles (from 2008)	14th Congress
	Pablo P. Garcia; Member for Cebu–2nd (1925–2021)	April 29, 2008	June 30, 2010	Lakas	Jose de Venecia Jr. (until 2008) Prospero Nograles (from 2008)	14th Congress
	Beng Climaco; Member for Zamboanga City–1st (born 1966)	July 26, 2010	June 30, 2013	Liberal	Feliciano Belmonte Jr.	15th Congress
	Raul Daza; Member for Northern Samar–1st (1935–2026)	July 26, 2010	June 30, 2013	Liberal	Feliciano Belmonte Jr.	15th Congress
	Arnulfo Fuentebella; Member for Camarines Sur–3rd (1945–2020)	July 26, 2010	June 30, 2013	NPC	Feliciano Belmonte Jr.	15th Congress
	Pablo P. Garcia; Member for Cebu–2nd (1925–2021)	July 26, 2010	June 30, 2013	NUP	Feliciano Belmonte Jr.	15th Congress
	Jesus Crispin Remulla; Member for Cavite–7th (born 1961)	July 26, 2010	June 30, 2013	Nacionalista	Feliciano Belmonte Jr.	15th Congress
	Erin Tañada; Member for Quezon–4th (born 1963)	July 26, 2010	June 30, 2013	Liberal	Feliciano Belmonte Jr.	15th Congress
	Henedina Abad; Member for Batanes–Lone (1955–2017)	July 22, 2013	June 30, 2016	Liberal	Feliciano Belmonte Jr.	16th Congress
	Giorgidi Aggabao; Member for Isabela–4th (born 1954)	July 22, 2013	June 30, 2016	NPC	Feliciano Belmonte Jr.	16th Congress
	Sergio Apostol; Member for Leyte–2nd (born 1935)	July 22, 2013	June 30, 2016	Liberal	Feliciano Belmonte Jr.	16th Congress
	Pangalian Balindong; Member for Lanao del Sur–2nd (1940–2025)	July 22, 2013	June 30, 2016	Liberal	Feliciano Belmonte Jr.	16th Congress
	Carlos Padilla; Member for Nueva Vizcaya–Lone (1944–2023)	July 22, 2013	June 30, 2016	Nacionalista	Feliciano Belmonte Jr.	16th Congress
	Roberto Puno; Member for Antipolo–1st (born 1962)	July 22, 2013	June 30, 2016	NUP	Feliciano Belmonte Jr.	16th Congress
	Raneo Abu; Member for Batangas–2nd (born 1967)	July 25, 2016	June 30, 2019	Nacionalista	Pantaleon Alvarez (until 2018) Gloria Macapagal Arroyo (from 2018)	17th Congress
	Mercedes Alvarez–Lansang; Member for Negros Occidental–6th (born 1982)	July 25, 2016	June 30, 2019	NPC	Pantaleon Alvarez (until 2018) Gloria Macapagal Arroyo (from 2018)	17th Congress
	Fredenil Castro; Member for Capiz–2nd (born 1951)	July 25, 2016	January 21, 2019	NUP	Pantaleon Alvarez (until 2018) Gloria Macapagal Arroyo (from 2018)	17th Congress
	Miro Quimbo; Member for Marikina–2nd (born 1969)	July 25, 2016	August 15, 2018	Liberal	Pantaleon Alvarez (until 2018) Gloria Macapagal Arroyo (from 2018)	17th Congress
	Eric Singson; Member for Ilocos Sur–2nd (born 1948)	July 25, 2016	June 30, 2019	PDP–Laban	Pantaleon Alvarez (until 2018) Gloria Macapagal Arroyo (from 2018)	17th Congress
	Gloria Macapagal Arroyo; Member for Pampanga–2nd (born 1947)	August 15, 2016	March 15, 2017	Lakas	Pantaleon Alvarez (until 2018) Gloria Macapagal Arroyo (from 2018)	17th Congress
	Pia Cayetano; Member for Taguig–2nd (born 1966)	August 15, 2016	June 30, 2019	Nacionalista	Pantaleon Alvarez (until 2018) Gloria Macapagal Arroyo (from 2018)	17th Congress
	Gwendolyn Garcia; Member for Cebu–3rd (born 1955)	August 15, 2016	August 15, 2018	PDP–Laban	Pantaleon Alvarez (until 2018) Gloria Macapagal Arroyo (from 2018)	17th Congress
	Mylene Garcia-Albano; Member for Davao City–2nd	August 15, 2016	June 30, 2019	PDP–Laban	Pantaleon Alvarez (until 2018) Gloria Macapagal Arroyo (from 2018)	17th Congress
	Sharon Garin; Party-list member (born 1971)	August 15, 2016	June 30, 2019	AAMBIS-Owa	Pantaleon Alvarez (until 2018) Gloria Macapagal Arroyo (from 2018)	17th Congress
	Dinand Hernandez; Member for South Cotabato–2nd (born 1966)	August 17, 2016	June 30, 2019	PDP-Laban	Pantaleon Alvarez (until 2018) Gloria Macapagal Arroyo (from 2018)	17th Congress
	Bai Sandra Sema; Member for Maguindanao–1st (born 1966)	August 17, 2016	June 30, 2019	PDP–Laban	Pantaleon Alvarez (until 2018) Gloria Macapagal Arroyo (from 2018)	17th Congress
	Frederick Abueg; Member for Palawan–2nd (born 1974)	September 13, 2016	June 30, 2019	PDP–Laban	Pantaleon Alvarez (until 2018) Gloria Macapagal Arroyo (from 2018)	17th Congress
	Rolando Andaya Jr. Member for Camarines Sur–1st (1969–2022)	September 13, 2016	July 30, 2018	PDP–Laban	Pantaleon Alvarez (until 2018) Gloria Macapagal Arroyo (from 2018)	17th Congress
	Linabelle Villarica; Member for Bulacan–4th (born 1949)	August 9, 2017	June 30, 2019	Liberal (until 2017)	Pantaleon Alvarez (until 2018) Gloria Macapagal Arroyo (from 2018)	17th Congress
	Linabelle Villarica; Member for Bulacan–4th (born 1949)	August 9, 2017	June 30, 2019	PDP-Laban (from 2017)	Pantaleon Alvarez (until 2018) Gloria Macapagal Arroyo (from 2018)	17th Congress
	Prospero Pichay Jr. Member for Surigao del Sur–1st (born 1950)	August 15, 2018	June 30, 2019	Lakas	Pantaleon Alvarez (until 2018) Gloria Macapagal Arroyo (from 2018)	17th Congress
	Arthur C. Yap; Member for Bohol–3rd (born 1965)	August 15, 2018	June 30, 2019	PDP–Laban	Pantaleon Alvarez (until 2018) Gloria Macapagal Arroyo (from 2018)	17th Congress
	Rose Marie Arenas; Member for Pangasinan–3rd (born 1940)	August 28, 2018	June 30, 2019	PDP–Laban	Pantaleon Alvarez (until 2018) Gloria Macapagal Arroyo (from 2018)	17th Congress
	Evelina Escudero; Member for Sorsogon–1st (born 1942)	August 28, 2018	June 30, 2019	NPC	Pantaleon Alvarez (until 2018) Gloria Macapagal Arroyo (from 2018)	17th Congress
	Randolph Ting; Member for Cagayan–3rd (born 1965)	January 21, 2019	June 30, 2019	NUP	Pantaleon Alvarez (until 2018) Gloria Macapagal Arroyo (from 2018)	17th Congress
	Raneo Abu; Member for Batangas–2nd (born 1967)	July 22, 2019	November 18, 2020	Nacionalista	Alan Peter Cayetano (until 2020) Lord Allan Velasco (from 2020)	18th Congress
	Paolo Duterte; Member for Davao City–1st (born 1975)	July 22, 2019	October 12, 2020	NUP	Alan Peter Cayetano (until 2020) Lord Allan Velasco (from 2020)	18th Congress
	Evelina Escudero; Member for Sorsogon–1st (born 1942)	July 22, 2019	June 30, 2022	NPC	Alan Peter Cayetano (until 2020) Lord Allan Velasco (from 2020)	18th Congress
	Conrado Estrella III; Party-list member (born 1960)	July 22, 2019	June 30, 2022	Abono	Alan Peter Cayetano (until 2020) Lord Allan Velasco (from 2020)	18th Congress
	Dan Fernandez; Member for Laguna–1st (born 1966)	July 22, 2019	November 18, 2020	PDP–Laban	Alan Peter Cayetano (until 2020) Lord Allan Velasco (from 2020)	18th Congress
	Aurelio Gonzales Jr. Member for Pampanga–3rd (born 1962)	July 22, 2019	December 7, 2020	PDP–Laban	Alan Peter Cayetano (until 2020) Lord Allan Velasco (from 2020)	18th Congress
	Neptali Gonzales II; Member for Mandaluyong–Lone (born 1964)	July 22, 2019	June 30, 2022	PDP–Laban (until 2020)	Alan Peter Cayetano (until 2020) Lord Allan Velasco (from 2020)	18th Congress
	Neptali Gonzales II; Member for Mandaluyong–Lone (born 1964)	July 22, 2019	June 30, 2022	NUP (from 2020)	Alan Peter Cayetano (until 2020) Lord Allan Velasco (from 2020)	18th Congress
	Dinand Hernandez; Member for South Cotabato–2nd (born 1966)	July 22, 2019	June 30, 2022	PDP-Laban	Alan Peter Cayetano (until 2020) Lord Allan Velasco (from 2020)	18th Congress
	Loren Legarda; Member for Antique–Lone (born 1960)	July 22, 2019	June 30, 2022	NPC	Alan Peter Cayetano (until 2020) Lord Allan Velasco (from 2020)	18th Congress
	Prospero Pichay Jr. Member for Surigao del Sur–1st (born 1950)	July 22, 2019	June 30, 2022	Lakas	Alan Peter Cayetano (until 2020) Lord Allan Velasco (from 2020)	18th Congress
	Johnny Pimentel; Member for Surigao del Sur–2nd (born 1956)	July 22, 2019	December 7, 2020	PDP–Laban	Alan Peter Cayetano (until 2020) Lord Allan Velasco (from 2020)	18th Congress
	Roberto Puno; Member for Antipolo–1st (born 1962)	July 22, 2019	June 30, 2022	NUP	Alan Peter Cayetano (until 2020) Lord Allan Velasco (from 2020)	18th Congress
	Luis Raymund Villafuerte; Member for Camarines Sur–2nd (born 1962)	July 22, 2019	October 14, 2020	Nacionalista	Alan Peter Cayetano (until 2020) Lord Allan Velasco (from 2020)	18th Congress
	Eddie Villanueva; Party-list member (born 1946)	July 22, 2019	June 30, 2022	CIBAC	Alan Peter Cayetano (until 2020) Lord Allan Velasco (from 2020)	18th Congress
	Rose Marie Arenas; Member for Pangasinan–3rd (born 1940)	July 30, 2019	June 30, 2022	PDP–Laban	Alan Peter Cayetano (until 2020) Lord Allan Velasco (from 2020)	18th Congress
	Pablo John Garcia; Member for Cebu–3rd (born 1967)	July 30, 2019	June 30, 2022	PDP–Laban (until 2021)	Alan Peter Cayetano (until 2020) Lord Allan Velasco (from 2020)	18th Congress
	Pablo John Garcia; Member for Cebu–3rd (born 1967)	July 30, 2019	June 30, 2022	NUP (from 2021)	Alan Peter Cayetano (until 2020) Lord Allan Velasco (from 2020)	18th Congress
	Rodante Marcoleta; Party-list member (born 1953)	July 30, 2019	June 30, 2022	SAGIP	Alan Peter Cayetano (until 2020) Lord Allan Velasco (from 2020)	18th Congress
	Henry Oaminal; Member for Misamis Occidental–2nd (born 1958)	July 30, 2019	June 30, 2022	Nacionalista	Alan Peter Cayetano (until 2020) Lord Allan Velasco (from 2020)	18th Congress
	Mujiv Hataman; Member for Basilan–Lone (born 1972)	August 13, 2019	June 30, 2022	Liberal	Alan Peter Cayetano (until 2020) Lord Allan Velasco (from 2020)	18th Congress
	Mikee Romero; Party-list member (born 1972)	August 13, 2019	October 2, 2020	1-PACMAN	Alan Peter Cayetano (until 2020) Lord Allan Velasco (from 2020)	18th Congress
	Vilma Santos; Member for Batangas–6th (born 1953)	August 13, 2019	June 30, 2022	Nacionalista	Alan Peter Cayetano (until 2020) Lord Allan Velasco (from 2020)	18th Congress
	Deogracias Victor Savellano; Member for Ilocos Sur–1st (1959–2025)	August 13, 2019	June 30, 2022	Nacionalista	Alan Peter Cayetano (until 2020) Lord Allan Velasco (from 2020)	18th Congress
	Fredenil Castro; Member for Capiz–2nd (born 1951)	October 2, 2020	November 18, 2020	Lakas	Alan Peter Cayetano (until 2020) Lord Allan Velasco (from 2020)	18th Congress
	Mikee Romero; Party-list member (born 1972)	October 14, 2020	June 30, 2022	1-PACMAN	Alan Peter Cayetano (until 2020) Lord Allan Velasco (from 2020)	18th Congress
	Lito Atienza; Party-list member (born 1941)	November 18, 2020	June 30, 2022	Buhay	Alan Peter Cayetano (until 2020) Lord Allan Velasco (from 2020)	18th Congress
	Rufus Rodriguez; Member for Cagayan de Oro–2nd (born 1953)	November 18, 2020	June 30, 2022	CDP	Alan Peter Cayetano (until 2020) Lord Allan Velasco (from 2020)	18th Congress
	Camille Villar; Member for Las Piñas–Lone (born 1985)	November 18, 2020	June 30, 2022	Nacionalista	Alan Peter Cayetano (until 2020) Lord Allan Velasco (from 2020)	18th Congress
	Benny Abante; Member for Manila–6th (born 1951)	December 7, 2020	June 30, 2022	NUP	Alan Peter Cayetano (until 2020) Lord Allan Velasco (from 2020)	18th Congress
	Juan Pablo Bondoc; Member for Pampanga–4th (born 1969)	December 7, 2020	June 30, 2022	PDP–Laban	Alan Peter Cayetano (until 2020) Lord Allan Velasco (from 2020)	18th Congress
	Wes Gatchalian; Member for Valenzuela–1st (born 1980)	December 7, 2020	June 30, 2022	NPC	Alan Peter Cayetano (until 2020) Lord Allan Velasco (from 2020)	18th Congress
	Bernadette Herrera; Party-list member (born 1976)	December 7, 2020	June 30, 2022	Bagong; Henerasyon	Alan Peter Cayetano (until 2020) Lord Allan Velasco (from 2020)	18th Congress
	Eric Martinez; Member for Valenzuela–2nd (born 1972)	December 7, 2020	June 30, 2022	PDP–Laban	Alan Peter Cayetano (until 2020) Lord Allan Velasco (from 2020)	18th Congress
	Rogelio Pacquiao; Member for Sarangani–Lone (born 1982)	December 7, 2020	June 30, 2022	PDP–Laban (until 2021)	Alan Peter Cayetano (until 2020) Lord Allan Velasco (from 2020)	18th Congress
	Rogelio Pacquiao; Member for Sarangani–Lone (born 1982)	December 7, 2020	June 30, 2022	PCM (from 2021)	Alan Peter Cayetano (until 2020) Lord Allan Velasco (from 2020)	18th Congress
	Kristine Singson-Meehan; Member for Ilocos Sur–2nd (born 1973)	December 7, 2020	June 30, 2022	Bileg (local)	Alan Peter Cayetano (until 2020) Lord Allan Velasco (from 2020)	18th Congress
	Kristine Singson-Meehan; Member for Ilocos Sur–2nd (born 1973)	December 7, 2020	June 30, 2022	NPC (from 2021)	Alan Peter Cayetano (until 2020) Lord Allan Velasco (from 2020)	18th Congress
	Arnie Teves; Member for Negros Oriental–3rd (born 1971)	December 7, 2020	June 30, 2022	PDP–Laban (until 2021)	Alan Peter Cayetano (until 2020) Lord Allan Velasco (from 2020)	18th Congress
	Arnie Teves; Member for Negros Oriental–3rd (born 1971)	December 7, 2020	June 30, 2022	NPC (from 2021)	Alan Peter Cayetano (until 2020) Lord Allan Velasco (from 2020)	18th Congress
	Divina Grace Yu; Member for Zamboanga del Sur–1st (born 1974)	December 7, 2020	June 30, 2022	PDP–Laban	Alan Peter Cayetano (until 2020) Lord Allan Velasco (from 2020)	18th Congress
	Strike Revilla; Member for Cavite–2nd (born 1970)	December 14, 2020	June 30, 2022	NUP (until 2021)	Alan Peter Cayetano (until 2020) Lord Allan Velasco (from 2020)	18th Congress
	Strike Revilla; Member for Cavite–2nd (born 1970)	December 14, 2020	June 30, 2022	Nacionalista (from 2021)	Alan Peter Cayetano (until 2020) Lord Allan Velasco (from 2020)	18th Congress
	Abraham Tolentino; Member for Cavite–8th (born 1964)	December 16, 2020	June 30, 2022	PDP–Laban (until 2021)	Alan Peter Cayetano (until 2020) Lord Allan Velasco (from 2020)	18th Congress
	Abraham Tolentino; Member for Cavite–8th (born 1964)	December 16, 2020	June 30, 2022	NUP (from 2021)	Alan Peter Cayetano (until 2020) Lord Allan Velasco (from 2020)	18th Congress
	Isidro Ungab; Member for Davao City–3rd (born 1961)	December 16, 2020	June 30, 2022	HNP	Alan Peter Cayetano (until 2020) Lord Allan Velasco (from 2020)	18th Congress
	Len Alonte; Member for Biñan–Lone (born 1974)	March 25, 2021	June 30, 2022	PDP–Laban	Alan Peter Cayetano (until 2020) Lord Allan Velasco (from 2020)	18th Congress
	Raymond Mendoza; Party-list member (born 1962)	July 25, 2022	June 30, 2025	TUCP	Martin Romualdez	19th Congress
	Roberto Puno; Member for Antipolo–1st (born 1962)	July 25, 2022	June 30, 2025	NUP	Martin Romualdez	19th Congress
	Kristine Singson-Meehan; Member for Ilocos Sur–2nd (born 1973)	July 25, 2022	June 30, 2025	NPC	Martin Romualdez	19th Congress
	Isidro Ungab; Member for Davao City–3rd (born 1961)	July 25, 2022	November 7, 2023	Lakas	Martin Romualdez	19th Congress
	Camille Villar; Member for Las Piñas–Lone (born 1985)	July 25, 2022	June 30, 2025	Nacionalista	Martin Romualdez	19th Congress
	Duke Frasco; Member for Cebu–5th (born 1981)	July 27, 2022	June 30, 2025	NUP (until 2025)	Martin Romualdez	19th Congress
	Duke Frasco; Member for Cebu–5th (born 1981)	July 27, 2022	June 30, 2025	1CEBU (from 2025)	Martin Romualdez	19th Congress
	Aurelio Gonzales Jr. Member for Pampanga–3rd (born 1962)	July 27, 2022	May 17, 2023	PDP–Laban (until 2023)	Martin Romualdez	19th Congress
	Aurelio Gonzales Jr. Member for Pampanga–3rd (born 1962)	July 27, 2022	May 17, 2023	Lakas (from 2023)	Martin Romualdez	19th Congress
	Ralph Recto; Member for Batangas–6th (born 1964)	July 27, 2022	January 22, 2024	Nacionalista	Martin Romualdez	19th Congress
	Gloria Macapagal Arroyo; Member for Pampanga–2nd (born 1947)	May 17, 2023	November 7, 2023	Lakas	Martin Romualdez	19th Congress
	Tonypet Albano; Member for Isabela–1st (born 1965)	November 7, 2023	June 30, 2025	Lakas	Martin Romualdez	19th Congress
	Yasser Balindong; Member for Lanao del Sur–2nd (born 1974)	November 7, 2023	June 30, 2025	Lakas	Martin Romualdez	19th Congress
	David Suarez; Member for Quezon–2nd (born 1977)	January 22, 2024	June 30, 2025	Lakas	Martin Romualdez	19th Congress
	Yasser Balindong; Member for Lanao del Sur–2nd (born 1974)	July 28, 2025	Incumbent	Lakas	Martin Romualdez (until 2025) Bojie Dy (from 2025)	20th Congress
	Ferjenel Biron; Member for Iloilo–4th (born 1964)	July 28, 2025	Incumbent	Nacionalista	Martin Romualdez (until 2025) Bojie Dy (from 2025)	20th Congress
	Bojie Dy; Member for Isabela–6th (born 1961)	July 28, 2025	September 17, 2025	PFP	Martin Romualdez (until 2025) Bojie Dy (from 2025)	20th Congress
	Janette Garin; Member for Iloilo–2nd (born 1972)	July 28, 2025	Incumbent	Lakas	Martin Romualdez (until 2025) Bojie Dy (from 2025)	20th Congress
	Jay Khonghun; Member for Zambales–1st (born 1977)	July 28, 2025	Incumbent	Lakas	Martin Romualdez (until 2025) Bojie Dy (from 2025)	20th Congress
	Raymond Mendoza; Party-list member (born 1962)	July 28, 2025	Incumbent	TUCP	Martin Romualdez (until 2025) Bojie Dy (from 2025)	20th Congress
	Paolo Ortega; Member for La Union–1st (born 1984)	July 28, 2025	Incumbent	Lakas	Martin Romualdez (until 2025) Bojie Dy (from 2025)	20th Congress
	Ronaldo Puno; Member for Antipolo–1st (born 1948)	July 28, 2025	Incumbent	NUP	Martin Romualdez (until 2025) Bojie Dy (from 2025)	20th Congress
	Kristine Singson-Meehan; Member for Ilocos Sur–2nd (born 1973)	July 28, 2025	August 3, 2026	NPC	Martin Romualdez (until 2025) Bojie Dy (from 2025)	20th Congress
	Yevgeny Emano; Member for Misamis Oriental–2nd (born 1975)	August 11, 2025	Incumbent	Nacionalista	Martin Romualdez (until 2025) Bojie Dy (from 2025)	20th Congress
	Dinand Hernandez; Member for South Cotabato–2nd (born 1966)	October 10, 2025	November 19, 2025	PFP	Martin Romualdez (until 2025) Bojie Dy (from 2025)	20th Congress
	David Suarez; Member for Quezon–2nd (born 1977)	November 19, 2025	Incumbent	Lakas	Martin Romualdez (until 2025) Bojie Dy (from 2025)	20th Congress
	Maria Rachel Arenas; Member for Pangasinan–3rd (born 1971)	March 18, 2026	Incumbent	Lakas	Martin Romualdez (until 2025) Bojie Dy (from 2025)	20th Congress
	Albee Benitez; Member for Bacolod–Lone (born 1966)	March 18, 2026	Incumbent	PFP	Martin Romualdez (until 2025) Bojie Dy (from 2025)	20th Congress
	Duke Frasco; Member for Cebu–5th (born 1980)	March 18, 2026	Incumbent	1CEBU	Martin Romualdez (until 2025) Bojie Dy (from 2025)	20th Congress
	Mercedes Alvarez–Lansang; Member for Negros Occidental–6th (born 1982)	August 3, 2026	Incumbent	NPC	Martin Romualdez (until 2025) Bojie Dy (from 2025)	20th Congress

== Relationship with the House speakership ==
Three speakers pro tempore and two deputy speakers were later elected speaker of the House, while two former speakers subsequently served as deputy speaker.

Officeholder	Served first as	Later served as
Quintín Paredes	Speaker pro tempore (1929–1930; 1933)	House speaker (1933–1935)
Jose Zulueta	Speaker pro tempore (1933–1941)	House speaker (1945–1946)
Daniel Romualdez	Speaker pro tempore (1954–1957)	House speaker (1958–1962)
Arnulfo Fuentebella	House speaker (2000–2001)	Deputy speaker (2007–2013)
Gloria Macapagal Arroyo	Deputy speaker (2016–2017)	House speaker (2018–2019)
Gloria Macapagal Arroyo	House speaker (2018–2019)	Deputy speaker (2022–2023)
Bojie Dy	Deputy speaker (2025)	House speaker (2025–present)

== See also ==
- Majority Floor Leader of the House of Representatives of the Philippines
- Minority Floor Leader of the House of Representatives of the Philippines
