= Congressional canvass for the 1961 Philippine presidential election =

The following is the official canvassing of votes by the Congress of the Philippines for the 1961 Philippine presidential election. The canvassing started on December 12, 1961, and ended on December 13, 1961.

== Joint Committee ==
The following are the members of the joint committee of the both houses of Congress which canvassed the returns for the presidential and vice presidential elections.

Senate
Co-chairman	Party
Arturo Tolentino	Nacionalista
Members	Party
Alejandro Almendras	Nacionalista
Estanislao Fernandez	Liberal
Oscar Ledesma	Nacionalista
Roseller T. Lim	Nacionalista
Ferdinand Marcos	Liberal
Lorenzo Sumulong	Nacionalista

House of Representatives
Co-chairman	Party	District
Constancio Castañeda	Nacionalista	Tarlac–2nd
Members	Party	District
Laurentino Badelles	Nacionalista	Lanao
Vicente Peralta	Nacionalista	Sorsogon–2nd
Lorenzo Teves	Nacionalista	Negros Oriental–1st
Marcelino Veloso	Nacionalista	Leyte–1st
Cornelio Villareal	Liberal	Capiz–2nd
Felicisimo Ocampo	Liberal	Nueva Ecija–2nd

== Presidential election ==
Candidate	Party	Votes	%
Diosdado Macapagal	Liberal Party	3,554,840	55.05
Carlos P. Garcia (incumbent)	Nacionalista Party	2,902,996	44.95
Alfredo Abcede	Federal Party	7	0.00
German F. Villanueva	Independent	2	0.00
Gregorio L. Llanza	Independent	2	0.00
Praxedes Floro	Independent	0	0.00
Total		6,457,847	100.00
Valid votes		6,457,847	95.83
Invalid/blank votes		280,988	4.17
Total votes		6,738,835	100.00
Registered voters/turnout		8,483,568	79.43
Source: Nohlen, Grotz, Hartmann, Hasall and Santos

Province/City	Macapagal	Garcia	Abcede	Villanueva	Llanza	Floro
Abra	19,826	13,529	0	0	0	0
Agusan	25,161	29,439	0	0	0	0
Aklan	34,712	26,339	0	0	0	0
Albay	65,308	45,247	0	0	0	0
Antique	26,930	25,356	0	0	0	0
Bacolod City	18,377	12,892	0	0	0	0
Baguio	10,539	5,122	0	0	0	0
Basilan City	6,508	6,477	0	0	0	0
Bataan	27,282	20,694	0	0	0	0
Batanes	2,024	1,604	1	0	0	0
Batangas	89,466	82,101	5	2	1	0
Bohol	34,807	118,920	0	0	0	0
Bukidnon	17,436	20,104	0	0	0	0
Bulacan	110,970	84,917	0	0	0	0
Butuan	11,722	16,732	0	0	0	0
Cabanatuan	11,058	8,339	0	0	0	0
Cagayan	69,757	27,562	0	0	0	0
Cagayan de Oro	8,341	8,734	0	0	0	0
Calbayog	5,849	8,837	0	0	0	0
Camarines Norte	29,566	17,745	0	0	0	0
Camarines Sur	89,115	65,858	0	0	1	0
Capiz	38,309	27,336	0	0	0	0
Catanduanes	18,924	19,901	0	0	0	0
Cavite	63,852	30,976	0	0	0	0
Cavite City	9,116	4,725	0	0	0	0
Cebu	58,015	165,668	0	0	0	0
Cebu City	13,386	48,622	0	0	0	0
Cotabato	81,381	94,659	0	0	0	0
Cotabato City	4,319	2,707	0	0	0	0
Dagupan	11,652	8,922	0	0	0	0
Davao	47,829	65,063	0	0	0	0
Davao City	22,461	31,232	0	0	0	0
Dumaguete	4,302	4,751	0	0	0	0
Gingoog	5,810	3,299	0	0	0	0
Iligan City	6,341	8,364	0	0	0	0
Ilocos Norte	57,004	24,251	0	0	0	0
Ilocos Sur	77,190	27,223	0	0	0	0
Iloilo	135,532	74,682	0	0	0	0
Iloilo City	23,361	25,383	0	0	0	0
Isabela	56,299	28,383	0	0	0	0
La Union	66,774	14,027	0	0	0	0
Laguna	60,981	56,337	0	0	0	0
Lanao del Norte	19,405	19,119	0	0	0	0
Lanao del Sur	29,623	42,913	0	0	0	0
Lapu-Lapu City	2,734	7,932	0	0	0	0
Legazpi City	8,707	8,290	0	0	0	0
Leyte	91,728	97,338	0	0	0	0
Lipa City	12,064	7,183	0	0	0	0
Lucena City	7,717	4,250	0	0	0	0
Manila	174,055	119,061	0	0	0	0
Marawi City	4,141	6,313	0	0	0	0
Marinduque	23,378	9,230	0	0	0	0
Masbate	36,623	31,893	0	0	0	0
Misamis Occidental	23,717	28,363	0	0	0	0
Misamis Oriental	34,948	25,795	0	0	0	0
Mountain Province	50,041	20,623	0	0	0	0
Naga City	7,645	5,531	0	0	0	0
Negros Occidental	108,393	85,386	0	0	0	0
Negros Oriental	44,090	54,053	0	0	0	0
Nueva Ecija	93,416	56,790	0	0	0	0
Nueva Vizcaya	25,276	8,007	0	0	0	0
Occidental Mindoro	12,981	10,096	0	0	0	0
Oriental Mindoro	37,716	21,209	0	0	0	0
Ormoc City	5,088	8,187	0	0	0	0
Ozamiz City	4,992	7,662	0	0	0	0
Palawan	21,841	16,077	0	0	0	0
Pampanga	111,776	45,228	0	0	0	0
Pangasinan	181,801	122,371	0	0	0	0
Pasay City	15,399	19,770	0	0	0	0
Quezon	99,441	53,364	0	0	0	0
Quezon City	42,989	28,880	0	0	0	0
Rizal	152,169	108,299	0	0	0	0
Romblon	16,452	19,092	0	0	0	0
Roxas City	8,697	5,631	0	0	0	0
Samar	91,918	76,185	0	0	0	0
San Carlos City	5,255	7,142	0	0	0	0
San Pablo City	13,639	7,513	0	0	0	0
Silay City	7,272	5,325	0	0	0	0
Sorsogon	49,657	39,654	0	0	0	0
Southern Leyte	23,269	31,419	0	0	0	0
Sulu	28,010	19,056	0	0	0	0
Surigao del Norte	24,487	29,038	0	0	0	0
Surigao del Sur	21,353	22,290	0	0	0	0
Tacloban City	7,045	8,394	0	0	0	0
Tagaytay City	824	718	0	0	0	0
Tarlac	80,110	27,018	0	0	0	0
Toledo City	1,390	8,973	0	0	0	0
Trece Martires City	431	79	0	0	0	0
Zambales	38,620	22,388	0	0	0	0
Zamboanga City	13,671	10,605	0	0	0	0
Zamboanga del Norte	27,531	25,498	0	0	0	0
Zamboanga del Sur	33,137	36,580	0	0	0	0
Total	3,554,840	2,902,966	7	2	2	0
Province/City						
Province/City	Macapagal	Garcia	Abcede	Villanueva	Llanza	Floro

== Vice presidential election ==
Candidate	Party	Votes	%
Emmanuel Pelaez	Liberal Party	2,394,400	37.57
Sergio Osmeña Jr.	Independent	2,190,424	34.37
Gil Puyat	Nacionalista Party	1,787,987	28.06
Chencay Reyes Juta	Dominion Status Party	2	0.00
Total		6,372,813	100.00
Valid votes		6,372,813	94.57
Invalid/blank votes		365,992	5.43
Total votes		6,738,805	100.00
Registered voters/turnout		8,483,568	79.43
Source: Nohlen, Grotz, Hartmann, Hasall and Santos

Province/City	Pelaez	Osmeña	Puyat	Juta
Abra	15,085	5,508	12,004	0
Agusan	22,921	17,422	13,281	0
Aklan	19,384	25,176	15,623	0
Albay	44,501	28,566	35,206	0
Antique	21,501	11,922	18,032	0
Bacolod City	8,285	18,227	4,464	0
Baguio	7,572	4,774	3,280	0
Basilan City	3,995	6,032	2,164	0
Bataan	16,189	16,013	14,775	0
Batanes	1,341	904	1,246	0
Batangas	40,922	72,039	59,900	0
Bohol	36,720	37,036	77,547	0
Bukidnon	17,946	11,458	7,894	0
Bulacan	83,961	53,664	54,616	0
Butuan	9,548	11,549	7,114	0
Cabanatuan	5,615	5,509	8,064	0
Cagayan	39,565	32,014	24,061	0
Cagayan de Oro	10,281	3,570	3,191	0
Calbayog	4,868	3,430	6,155	0
Camarines Norte	17,570	18,691	10,626	0
Camarines Sur	56,542	49,937	46,471	0
Capiz	31,126	10,701	22,345	0
Catanduanes	17,216	3,284	18,011	0
Cavite	42,552	36,873	15,318	0
Cavite City	5,128	7,503	1,462	0
Cebu	12,621	147,414	66,973	0
Cebu City	7,552	44,425	10,812	0
Cotabato	65,182	58,636	47,234	0
Cotabato City	3,170	2,620	1,114	0
Dagupan	9,618	3,513	7,259	0
Davao	33,852	58,751	19,567	0
Davao City	18,083	26,448	9,127	0
Dumaguete	3,663	2,469	2,870	0
Gingoog	6,357	1,838	839	0
Iligan City	4,288	7,276	3,048	0
Ilocos Norte	39,054	15,883	25,690	0
Ilocos Sur	59,742	15,164	27,632	0
Iloilo	84,467	88,188	33,528	0
Iloilo City	18,273	10,741	19,511	0
Isabela	31,109	31,317	21,298	2
La Union	38,352	33,621	8,175	0
Laguna	29,791	56,628	32,101	0
Lanao del Norte	15,855	14,802	6,651	0
Lanao del Sur	14,189	15,638	36,022	0
Lapu-Lapu City	1,028	7,613	1,866	0
Legazpi City	7,282	3,373	6,126	0
Leyte	74,439	37,429	73,861	0
Lipa City	4,840	8,967	5,192	0
Lucena City	3,994	5,616	2,571	0
Manila	129,595	125,607	39,067	0
Marawi City	1,532	3,088	4,993	0
Marinduque	9,765	16,709	5,664	0
Masbate	19,800	34,886	12,211	0
Misamis Occidental	24,246	13,341	13,770	0
Misamis Oriental	41,825	8,233	9,988	0
Mountain Province	28,704	22,750	16,786	0
Naga City	4,474	6,413	2,259	0
Negros Occidental	58,337	86,671	43,966	0
Negros Oriental	32,033	25,515	39,080	0
Nueva Ecija	54,144	41,976	50,744	0
Nueva Vizcaya	10,060	19,220	3,705	0
Occidental Mindoro	9,803	6,902	5,980	0
Oriental Mindoro	21,063	25,135	11,462	0
Ormoc City	4,048	4,800	4,365	0
Ozamiz City	5,219	4,972	2,399	0
Palawan	14,094	11,356	11,477	0
Pampanga	61,664	12,978	80,303	0
Pangasinan	146,375	52,036	103,228	0
Pasay City	10,368	19,202	5,483	0
Quezon	61,895	47,020	43,939	0
Quezon City	32,334	28,816	10,868	0
Rizal	100,657	107,818	50,536	0
Romblon	15,428	2,626	17,325	0
Roxas City	7,329	1,838	4,949	0
Samar	69,558	32,672	61,670	0
San Carlos City	1,834	7,711	2,725	0
San Pablo City	5,364	11,849	4,429	0
Silay City	5,189	3,920	2,845	0
Sorsogon	34,453	23,703	29,740	0
Southern Leyte	19,469	21,159	13,278	0
Sulu	14,803	14,229	11,851	0
Surigao del Norte	22,720	12,675	17,111	0
Surigao del Sur	19,115	12,693	10,722	0
Tacloban City	6,659	1,526	7,105	0
Tagaytay City	578	794	178	0
Tarlac	50,362	31,544	23,630	0
Toledo City	444	5,038	4,943	0
Trece Martires City	175	300	28	0
Zambales	20,132	27,445	12,927	0
Zamboanga City	10,612	6,980	6,100	0
Zamboanga del Norte	15,538	23,824	12,791	0
Zamboanga del Sur	25,266	29,847	13,280	0
Total	2,394,400	2,190,424	1,787,987	2
Province/City				
Province/City	Pelaez	Osmeña	Puyat	Juta
