= Philippine Constitutional Convention of 1934 =

Philippine constituent assembly that drafted the 1935 Constitution

- Constitutional convention

Type
- Type: Unicameral

History
- Founded: July 30, 1934
- Disbanded: February 19, 1935 (adjourned)
- Succeeded by: Philippine Constitutional Convention of 1971

Leadership
- President: Claro M. Recto
- First Vice President: Ruperto Montinola
- Second Vice President: Teodoro Sandiko
- Seats: 202

Elections
- Last election: July 10, 1934

Meeting place
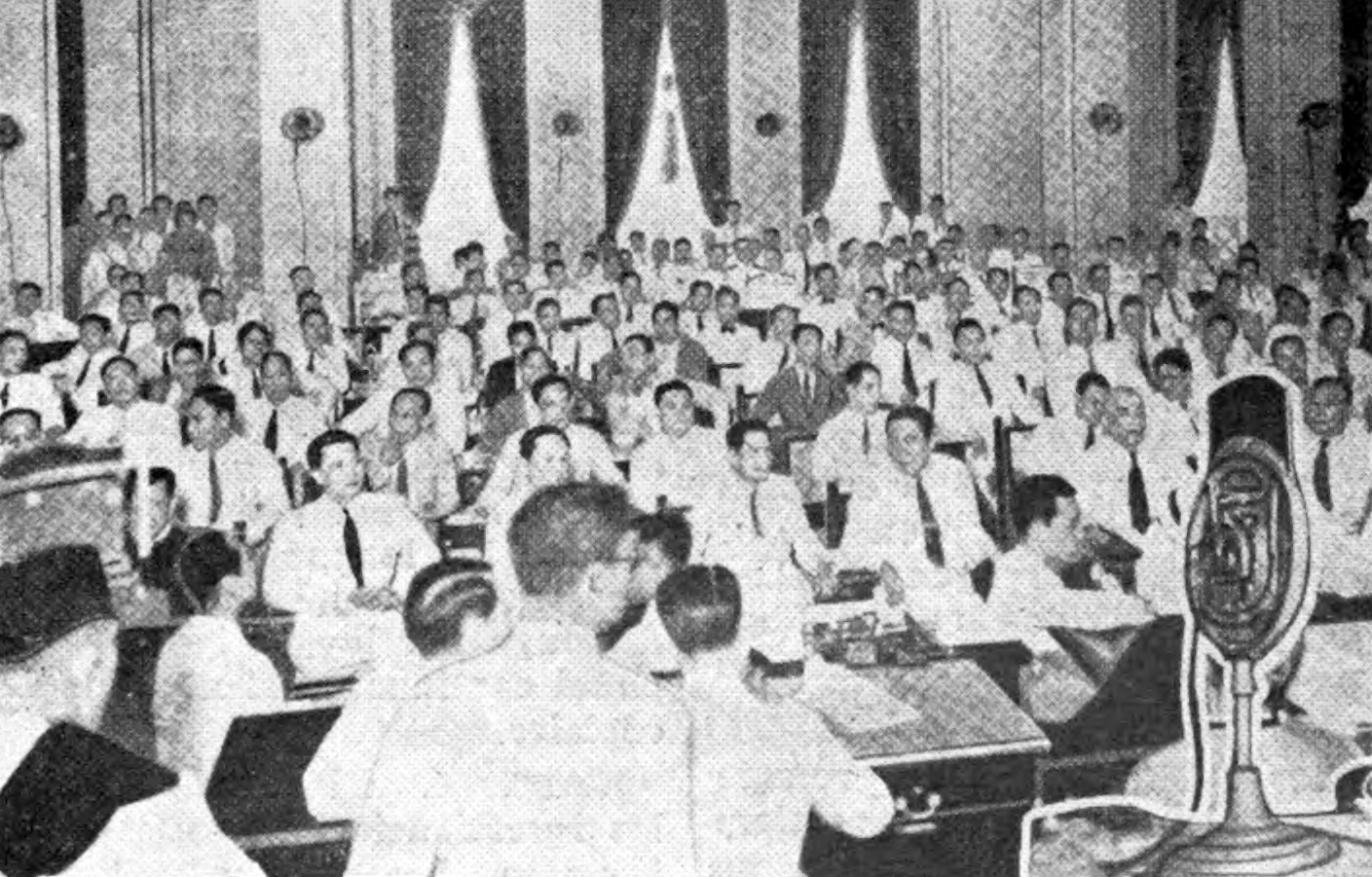
- Session Hall of the House of Representatives, Legislative Building, Manila

The Philippine Constitutional Convention of 1934, also known as the 1934 Constitutional Convention, was an elected constituent assembly in the Philippine Islands that drafted the Constitution establishing the Commonwealth of the Philippines. Formally styled the Constitutional Convention, it was organized under the Tydings–McDuffie Act and Philippine Act No. 4125.

The convention consisted of 202 delegates and met in Manila from July 30, 1934, until February 19, 1935. Claro M. Recto served as its president, with Ruperto Montinola and Teodoro Sandiko as first and second vice presidents, respectively. The convention approved the proposed constitution on February 8, 1935. It was subsequently certified by United States President Franklin D. Roosevelt and ratified by Filipino voters in the 1935 Philippine constitutional plebiscite.

== Background ==
The United States Congress enacted the Philippine Independence Act, commonly known as the Tydings–McDuffie Act, on March 24, 1934. The law provided for a transitional commonwealth government followed by recognition of Philippine independence. It authorized Filipinos to draft a constitution, subject to specified requirements and certification by the president of the United States before submission to a popular vote.

The Philippine Legislature enacted Act No. 4125 on May 26, 1934, to provide for the election and meeting of the convention. The statute allotted two delegates to each representative district, with separate arrangements for the special provinces of Mindanao and Sulu, the subprovinces of Mountain Province and the city of Baguio. It prescribed a total membership of 202 and made the office of delegate honorary.

== Election and organization ==
The delegates were elected on July 10, 1934. Most were chosen by plurality vote among registered electors. Under Act No. 4125, however, the delegates representing Mountain Province, Bukidnon, Cotabato, Lanao and Sulu were selected by secret ballot at meetings of municipal and municipal-district officials.

The convention opened on July 30 in the session hall of the House of Representatives in Manila. Senate President Manuel L. Quezon initially called the assembly to order, and the delegates selected José P. Laurel as temporary chair. Recto was then elected permanent president. The convention elected Montinola and Sandiko as vice presidents, Narciso Pimentel as secretary and Narciso Diokno as sergeant-at-arms.

== Leadership ==
President of the Convention

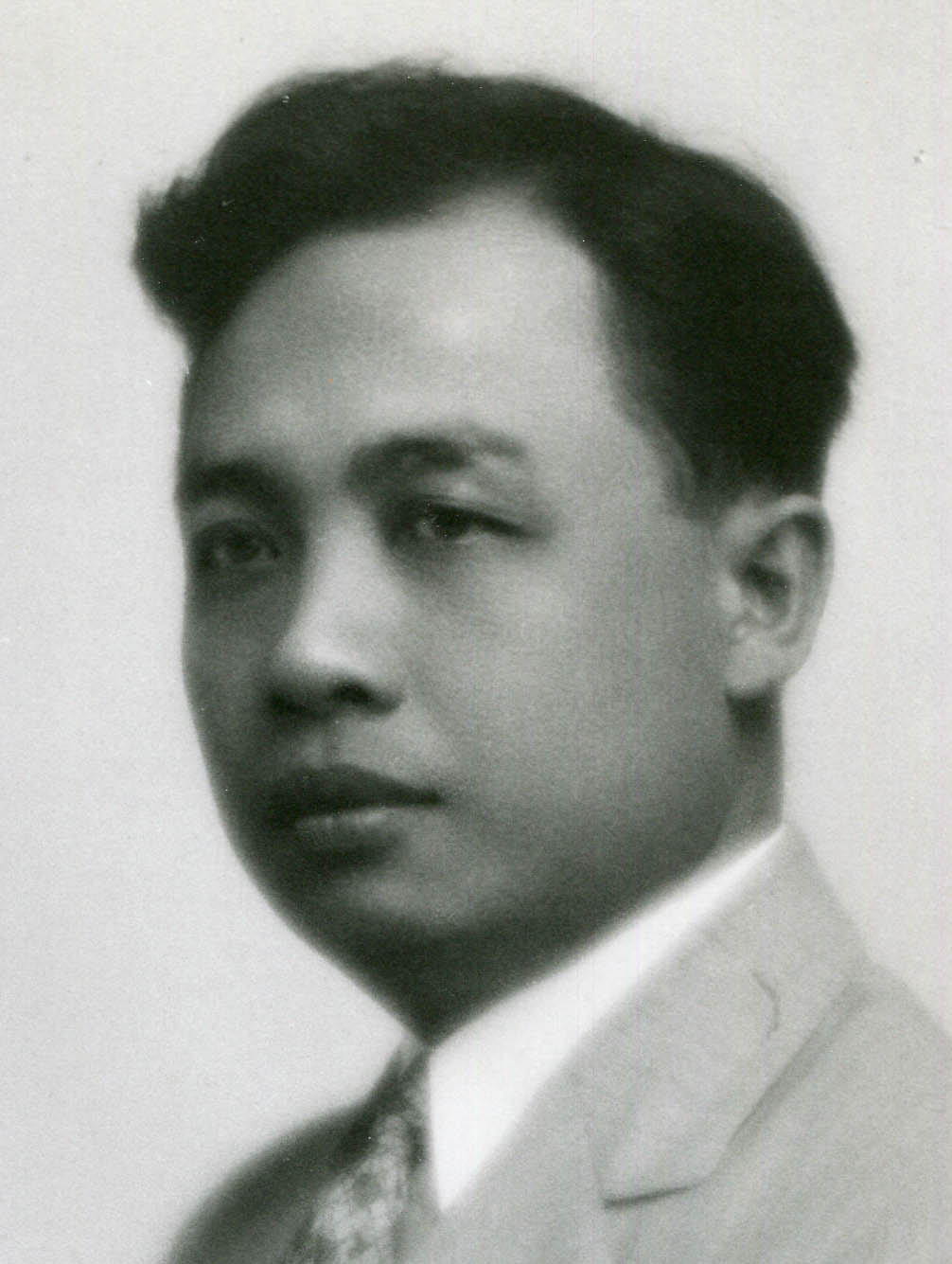
Claro M. Recto

- President: Claro M. Recto (Batangas–3rd)
- First Vice-President: Ruperto Montinola (Iloilo–2nd)
- Second Vice-President: Teodoro Sandiko (Bulacan–1st)

== Members ==
Province/City	District	Delegates
Abra	Lone	Julio Borbon
Abra	Lone	Jesus Paredes
Agusan	Lone	Apolonio D. Curato
Agusan	Lone	Delfin Gumban
Albay	1st	Jose Bonto
Albay	1st	Ambrosio Calleja
Albay	2nd	Saturnino Benito
Albay	2nd	Toribio P. Perez
Albay	3rd	Jose Conejero
Albay	3rd	Francisco Muñoz
Albay	4th	Braulio Leonardo
Albay	4th	Jesus B. Surban
Antique	Lone	Ramon Maza
Antique	Lone	Angel Salazar
Bataan	Lone	Roman Cruz
Bataan	Lone	Miguel Cuaderno Sr.
Batanes	Lone	Juan Castillejos
Batanes	Lone	Mariano Lizardo
Batangas	1st	Antonino Barrion
Batangas	1st	Conrado V. Sanchez
Batangas	2nd	Eusebio M. Lopez
Batangas	2nd	Eusebio Orense
Batangas	3rd	Jose P. Laurel
Batangas	3rd	Claro M. Recto
Bohol	1st	Gaudencio Cloribel
Bohol	1st	Bernardino Inting
Bohol	2nd	Perfecto Balili
Bohol	2nd	Jose Clarin
Bohol	3rd	Teofilo Buslon
Bohol	3rd	Anastacio Mumar
Bukidnon	Lone	Pedro Melendez
Bukidnon	Lone	Jose S. Sanvictores
Bulacan	1st	Nicolas Buendia
Bulacan	1st	Teodoro Sandiko
Bulacan	2nd	Manuel L. Sevilla
Bulacan	2nd	Antonio Villarama
Cagayan	1st	Marcelo Adduru
Cagayan	1st	Vicente Nepomuceno
Cagayan	2nd	Antonio Guzman
Cagayan	2nd	Miguel Pio
Camarines Norte	Lone	Baldomero Lapak
Camarines Norte	Lone	Wenceslao Vinzons
Camarines Sur	1st	Manuel Abella
Camarines Sur	1st	Gabriel P. Prieto
Camarines Sur	2nd	Severo Cea
Camarines Sur	2nd	Exequiel S. Grageda
Capiz	1st	Jose Altavas
Capiz	1st	Manuel Roxas
Capiz	2nd	Antonio A. Arcenas
Capiz	2nd	Cornelio Villareal
Capiz	3rd	Jose Hontiveros
Capiz	3rd	Teodulfo Suñer
Cavite	Lone	Demetrio Encarnacion
Cavite	Lone	Vicente Francisco
Cebu	1st	Manuel Briones
Cebu	1st	Antonio Mansueto
Cebu	2nd	Paulino Gullas
Cebu	2nd	Filemon Sotto
Cebu	3rd	Vicente Sotto
Cebu	3rd	Antonio Ybañez
Cebu	4th	Casiano S. Carin
Cebu	4th	Cesar Kintanar
Cebu	5th	Mariano Jesus Cuenco
Cebu	5th	Dionisio Niere
Cebu	6th	Nicolas Rafols
Cebu	6th	Felismeno V. Rivera
Cebu	7th	Juanito T. Maramara
Cebu	7th	Hilario Moncado
Cotabato	Lone	Menendang Piang
Cotabato	Lone	Blah T. Sinsuat
Davao	Lone	Rafael Castillo
Davao	Lone	Pantaleon A. Pelayo
Ilocos Norte	1st	Maximino Bueno
Ilocos Norte	1st	Irineo Ranjo
Ilocos Norte	2nd	Servando Castro
Ilocos Norte	2nd	Francisco Ventura
Ilocos Sur	1st	Elpidio Quirino
Ilocos Sur	1st	Vicente Singson Encarnacion
Ilocos Sur	2nd	Artemio Abaya
Ilocos Sur	2nd	Delfin Joven
Iloilo	1st	Mariano Ezpeleta
Iloilo	1st	Sofronio M. Flores
Iloilo	2nd	Fermin Caram
Iloilo	2nd	Ruperto Montinola
Iloilo	3rd	Tomas Confesor
Iloilo	3rd	Tiburcio Lutero
Iloilo	4th	Tranquilino J. Divinagracia
Iloilo	4th	Matias Yusay
Iloilo	5th	Jose Aldeguer
Iloilo	5th	Jose Ganzon
Isabela	Lone	Manuel B. Binag
Isabela	Lone	Elias Ocampo
La Union	1st	Pio Ancheta
La Union	1st	Camilo Osias
La Union	2nd	Alejandro de Guzman
La Union	2nd	Enrique C. Sobrepeña
Laguna	1st	Jose Maria Delgado
Laguna	1st	Domingo Zavalla
Laguna	2nd	Conrado Benitez
Laguna	2nd	Pedro Guevara
Lanao	Lone	Alauya Alonto
Lanao	Lone	Tomas Cabili
Leyte	1st	Mateo Canonoy
Leyte	1st	Rafael Martinez
Leyte	2nd	Quiremon Alkuino
Leyte	2nd	Manuel Martinez Corro
Leyte	3rd	Victorino N. Salazar
Leyte	3rd	Francisco Zialcita
Leyte	4th	Ruperto Kapunan
Leyte	4th	Norberto Romualdez
Leyte	5th	Atilano Cinco
Leyte	5th	Mamerto S. Ribo
Manila	1st	Manuel Lim
Manila	1st	Gregorio Perfecto
Manila	2nd	Salvador Araneta
Manila	2nd	Rafael Palma
Marinduque	Lone	Ricardo Nepomuceno
Marinduque	Lone	Timoteo P. Ricohermoso
Masbate	Lone	Amancio Aguilar (Note: Amancio Aguilar died on August 17, 1934.)
Masbate	Lone	Jose Zurbito
Mindoro	Lone	Cipriano Liboro
Mindoro	Lone	Juan Navarro
Misamis Occidental	Lone	Paulino A. Conol
Misamis Occidental	Lone	José Ozámiz
Misamis Oriental	Lone	Jose Artadi
Misamis Oriental	Lone	Manuel C. Fernandez
Mountain Province	Apayao	Blas Villamor
Mountain Province	Apayao	Jose Fakangan
Mountain Province	Baguio	Sixto A. Gaerlan
Mountain Province	Baguio	Felipe E. Jose
Mountain Province	Benguet	Jose O. Cariño
Mountain Province	Benguet	Jose Velasco
Mountain Province	Bontoc	Clement F. Irving
Mountain Province	Bontoc	Jose M. Lorenzana
Mountain Province	Ifugao	Alberto Crespillo
Mountain Province	Ifugao	Miguel Gumangan
Mountain Province	Kalinga	Max Duguiang
Mountain Province	Kalinga	Saturnino Moldero
Negros Occidental	1st	Juan Ledesma
Negros Occidental	1st	Jose Locsin
Negros Occidental	2nd	Pedro Hernaez
Negros Occidental	2nd	Simplicio Lizares
Negros Occidental	3rd	Enrique Montilla
Negros Occidental	3rd	Jesus Y. Perez
Negros Oriental	1st	Vicente Lopez
Negros Oriental	1st	Hermenegildo Villanueva
Negros Oriental	2nd	Sergio G. Jumawan
Negros Oriental	2nd	Jose E. Romero
Nueva Ecija	1st	Eugenio Baltao
Nueva Ecija	1st	Florentino O. Chioco
Nueva Ecija	2nd	Exequiel Santos
Nueva Ecija	2nd	Bonifacio Ysip
Nueva Vizcaya	Lone	Leon Cabarroguis
Nueva Vizcaya	Lone	Demetrio Quirino
Palawan	Lone	Gaudencio E. Abordo
Palawan	Lone	Evaristo R. Sandoval
Pampanga	1st	Felix Bautista
Pampanga	1st	Juan D. Nepomuceno
Pampanga	2nd	Jose Alejandrino
Pampanga	2nd	Jose Gutierrez David
Pangasinan	1st	Enrique Braganza
Pangasinan	1st	Anacleto R. Ramos
Pangasinan	2nd	Numeriano Tanopo
Pangasinan	2nd	Juan Ventanilla
Pangasinan	3rd	Pascual M. Beltran
Pangasinan	3rd	Jose L. de Guzman
Pangasinan	4th	Jose M. Aruego
Pangasinan	4th	Eusebio Sison
Pangasinan	5th	Leoncio R. Esliza
Pangasinan	5th	Bernabe de Guzman
Rizal	1st	Castor P. Cruz
Rizal	1st	Juan Ortega
Rizal	2nd	Domingo T. Dikit
Rizal	2nd	Mariano Melendres
Romblon	Lone	Manuel Albero
Romblon	Lone	Antonio Montesa
Samar	1st	Agripino P. Escareal
Samar	1st	Luciano Ortiz
Samar	2nd	Pedro R. Arteche
Samar	2nd	Serafin Marabut
Samar	3rd	Felipe Abrigo
Samar	3rd	Juan L. Bocar
Sorsogon	1st	Adolfo Grafilo
Sorsogon	1st	Jose S. Reyes
Sorsogon	2nd	Francisco Arellano
Sorsogon	2nd	Mario Guariña
Sulu	Lone	Jose Montaño
Sulu	Lone	Arolas Tulawi
Surigao	Lone	Clementino D. Diez
Surigao	Lone	Montano A. Ortiz
Tarlac	1st	Gregorio M. Bañaga
Tarlac	1st	Luis Morales
Tarlac	2nd	Alejandro Galang
Tarlac	2nd	Enrique Maglanoc
Tayabas	1st	Fabian R. Millar
Tayabas	1st	Godofredo Reyes
Tayabas	2nd	Romualdo Enriquez
Tayabas	2nd	Vicente Salumbides
Zambales	Lone	Alejo Labrador
Zambales	Lone	Potenciano Lesaca
Zamboanga	Lone	Pablo Lorenzo
Zamboanga	Lone	Florentino Saguin

== Drafting proceedings ==
The convention organized committees to consider different parts of the proposed charter. A seven-member subcommittee called the “Seven Wise Men” prepared a consolidated draft from the committee reports. Its members were Filemon Sotto, Manuel Roxas, Vicente Singson Encarnacion, Manuel Briones, Miguel Cuaderno, Norberto Romualdez and Conrado Benitez. The subcommittee submitted its report on October 20, 1934.

The delegates debated the structure of the executive and legislature, the powers of government, citizenship, suffrage, social justice, economic policy, natural resources, civil liberties and the proposed national language. Historian Gonzalo Malihan described consensus building, majority rule and the convention's leadership as important to its decisions, which were also constrained by requirements in the Tydings–McDuffie Act.

The language question produced prolonged disagreement. Proposals to designate Tagalog immediately as the national language were initially defeated. The final text instead directed the future National Assembly to develop and adopt a common national language based on one of the existing native languages, while retaining English and Spanish as official languages until otherwise provided by law.

As completed, the proposed constitution established a republican government with separated legislative, executive and judicial powers. It contained a bill of rights and originally provided for a unicameral National Assembly and a president elected to a six-year term without immediate reelection.

=== Committees ===
The Constitutional Convention of 1934 had 47 committees:

Committee	Chairman
Accounts	Fabian R. Millar
Agricultural Development	Juan Ledesma
Amendments to the Constitution	José Ozámiz
Bill of Rights	Jose P. Laurel
Citizenship and Naturalization	Gregorio Perfecto
Citizenship Duties	Jose S. Reyes
Civil Service	Luis Morales
Commerce	Salvador Araneta
Comparative Study of Constitutions	Jose Hontiveros
Constitutional Guarantees	Manuel Lim
Credentials	Vicente Nepomuceno
Currency and Banks	Miguel Cuaderno Sr.
Declaration of Principles	Rafael Palma
Delimitation of Territory	Nicolas Buendia
Executive Power	Mariano Jesus Cuenco
Finance and Public Accounts	Vicente Singson Encarnacion
Franchises	Jose M. Aruego
Health and Hygiene	Antonio Villarama
Immigration	Alejandro de Guzman
Impeachment	Jose Gutierrez David
Industry	Conrado Benitez
Insular Police	Jose Zurbito
Interior Government	Mariano Melendres
Judicial Power	Vicente Francisco
Labor and Social Welfare	Jose Maria Delgado
Legislative Power	Manuel Briones
Mandatory Provisions	Francisco Ventura
Metropolitan and Foreign Relations	Pedro Guevara
Miscellaneous Matters	Ambrosio Calleja
National Defense	Jose Alejandrino
Nationalization and Conservation of Land and Natural Resources	Jose Locsin
Nationalization of the Public Utilities	Camilo Osias
Official Language	Alejo Labrador
Preamble	Norberto Romualdez
Printing	Jose Conejero
Privileges	Romualdo Enriquez
Provincial and Municipal Governments	Hermenegildo Villanueva
Public Instruction	Ricardo Nepomuceno
Rules	Jose E. Romero
Scientific Research	Juan Ortega
Selection of Resident Commissioner under the Commonwealth	Fermin Caram
Special Provinces	Menendang Piang
Sponsorship	Filemon Sotto
Style	Vicente Sotto
Suffrage	Jose Altavas
Tariff	Serafin Marabut
Transitory Provisions	Ruperto Kapunan

== Approval and ratification ==
On February 8, 1935, the convention conducted a roll-call vote and approved the proposed constitution. Tomás Cabili of Lanao cast the only negative vote recorded in the convention journal. Delegates signed the document before the convention adjourned on February 19, subject to recall if further action was required.

The proposed constitution was submitted to Roosevelt on March 18. He certified on March 23 that it substantially conformed to the Philippine Independence Act. The Philippine Legislature subsequently enacted Act No. 4200, providing for its submission to the electorate on May 14, 1935. Voters ratified the constitution, completing the process required for establishing the Commonwealth government. The Commonwealth was inaugurated on November 15, 1935.

== Historical significance ==
Malihan characterized the convention as a milestone in Philippine constitutional history because it was the first occasion under American rule on which Filipinos were permitted to write the fundamental law intended to govern their transition to autonomy and independence. He also noted that three delegates—Laurel, Roxas and Elpidio Quirino—later became presidents of the Philippines.

The constitution produced by the convention initially governed the Commonwealth and, following independence, the Third Philippine Republic. It was amended in 1940 and, apart from the period of the Japanese-sponsored Second Philippine Republic, remained the country's fundamental law until the adoption of the 1973 Constitution.

== See also ==
- Constitutional convention (Philippines)
- Constitution of the Philippines
- 1935 Philippine constitutional plebiscite
- Philippine Constitutional Convention of 1971
- Philippine Constitutional Commission of 1986
