= Datu Blah T. Sinsuat =

Datu Blah T. Sinsuat may refer to

- Blah T. Sinsuat, former Filipino lawmaker from Cotabato
- Datu Blah T. Sinsuat, Maguindanao del Norte, a municipality named in his honor
