= Battle of Maguindanao =

Coordinates: 7.13333°N 124.3°E

Date	January to September 1945
Location	Maguindanao, Philippines
Result	Allied victory

Belligerents
United States: Commonwealth of the Philippines	Japan: Second Philippine Republic

Commanders and leaders
(United States) Wendell Fertig (Commonwealth of the Philippines) Gumbay Piang (Commonwealth of the Philippines) Salipada K. Pendatun	(Empire of Japan) Gyosaku Morozumi

Units involved
Philippine 108th Division: Expeditionary Battalion; 105th Infantry; Maguindanao Militia Force (a Moro force under operational control of 108th Division)	Japanese 166th Independent Infantry Battalion, 100th Division

Casualties and losses
17 killed 21 wounded	About 250 killed

The Battle of Maguindanao or Cotabato and Maguindanao Campaign (Filipino: Labanan sa Maguindanao o Kampanya sa Cotabato at Maguindanao) was one of the final battles of the Philippines Campaign of World War II. The battle was fought in advance of U.S. landings by Philippine Commonwealth military forces and the recognized Christian and Muslim guerrilla fighters against Imperial Japanese Army troops.

Japanese forces, numbering about 1,500 men of the 166th Independent Infantry Battalion, in the Malabang-Cotabato area were part of the 100th Division garrison troops, approximately one third Koreans, that were demoralized by poor officers and a defeatist attitude. The guerrillas had been destroying supplies, blowing bridges and making even small truck convoys or small patrols impossible for months even before their direct offensive operations began in April.

Beginning in early March 1945 part of Colonel Wendell Fertig's 10th Military District guerrilla force, the guerrilla 108th Division began attacking the Japanese garrison at Malabang with some air support from U.S. Marine Corps and United States Army Air Forces aircraft. The 108th was commanded by Lt. Col. Charles W. Hedges, an unsurrendered U.S. Army officer, with forces at Malabang commanded by an Australian officer who had escaped from Borneo, Maj. Rex Blow. The elements of the 108th directly involved were the Expeditionary Battalion, part of the 105th Infantry and the Moro Maranao Militia Force that was under the operational control of the 108th.

In late March progress was such that Stinson L-5 Sentinel liaison planes could use the Malabang strip and on 5 April Marine Corps aircraft were using the strip. By the 11 April, the Japanese had fled toward Parang and on 13 April Colonel Fertig notified Eighth Army that U.S. forces could land unopposed at Malabang and Parang with indication the Japanese had probably evacuated the Cotabato area. The reoccupation effort cost the guerrillas 17 dead and 21 wounded with perhaps 250 Japanese losses with an estimated fewer than 100 escaping. After confirmation by Marine air reconnaissance previous plans were changed so that one battalion of the 24th Division assault forces of Task Group 78.2 would go ashore at Malabang with the rest going directly to Parang. Despite Fertig's assertion no shore bombardment would be necessary a bombardment preceded the landings beginning shortly after 0730 on 17 April.

== See also ==
- Battle of Mindanao
- List of American guerrillas in the Philippines

== Bibliography ==
- Smith, Robert Ross (1993). Triumph in the Philippines. United States Army In World War II—The War in the Pacific. Washington, DC: Center Of Military History, United States Army. LCCN 62060000. Archived from the original on September 21, 2012.
