= Gumbay Piang =

Filipino politician (1905–1949)

Member of the Philippine House of Representatives from Cotabato's Lone District
- In office May 25, 1946 – November 9, 1949
- Preceded by: Ugalingan Piang (as Assemblyman)
- Succeeded by: Blah T. Sinsuat

Personal details
- Born: 1905 Dulawan, Cotabato, Moro Province, Philippine Islands
- Died: November 9, 1949 (aged 43–44) Manila, Philippines
- Parents: Datu Piang (father); Polindao (mother)

Datu Gumbay Piang (1905 - November 9, 1949) was a Maguindanaon leader.

Gumbay Piang was born in Dulawan, Cotabato district, Moro Province (present-day Datu Piang, Maguindanao del Sur) in 1905, a son of the Moro leader Datu Piang from his sixth wife, Polindao. He was trained as a pedagogist at the then-US-administered Philippine Normal School in Manila. Gumbay worked his way through the bureaucracy where he served for different school boards of his province.

When the Second World War erupted, Gumbay Piang, along with fellow Moro leaders such as Salipada Pendatun, organized the famed resistance group named the Moro-Bolo Battalion during the Japanese occupation of the Philippines to fight the Japanese. The insignia of the group was the bolo and the kris, the respective weapons of Christian and Muslim populations, respectively, symbolizing a united front against the Japanese aggressors. The Moro-Bolo Battalion consisted of about 20,000 men. Gumbay Piang's Cotabato Moros used Bolo knives to fight the Japanese, and swore that they would "fight to the last".

He was forced to retire from the resistance as a prisoner of war as he suffered chronic asthma attacks. When the Philippines was liberated from the Japanese Imperial forces. In 1946, he ran for Congress in the First Republic of the Philippines and won, representing the lone district of Cotabato. In 1949, he died in Manila due to asthma, marking the quiet exit of the Piangs from national politics.
