= Blah T. Sinsuat =

Filipino politician (1908–1984)

Datu Blah T. Sinsuat
- بلاه تي سينسوات
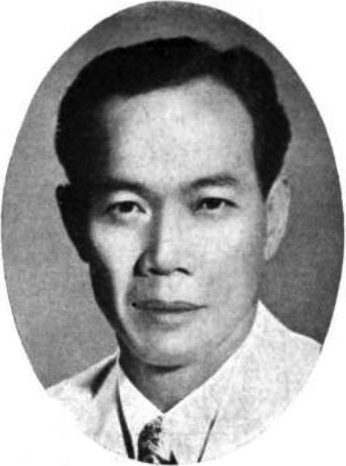
- Sinsuat's official portrait during the 2nd Congress

Speaker pro tempore of the Batasang Pambansa
- In office November 10, 1981 – June 30, 1984
- Speaker: Querube Makalintal
- Preceded by: Jose Aldeguer (as speaker pro tempore of the House of Representatives)
- Succeeded by: Salipada Pendatun

Member of the Batasang Pambansa from Region XII
- In office June 12, 1978 – June 30, 1984

Member of the Philippine House of Representatives for Cotabato's at-large district
- In office December 30, 1949 – December 30, 1953
- Preceded by: Gumbay Piang
- Succeeded by: Luminog Mangelen

Member of the 1934 Constitutional Convention for Cotabato's at-large district
- In office July 30, 1934 – February 8, 1935

Personal details
- Born: Blah Tawapa Sinsuat; December 27, 1908 Dinaig, Cotabato, Moro Province, Philippine Islands
- Died: December 11, 1984 (aged 75) Quezon City, Philippines
- Party: KBL (1978–1984)
- Other political affiliations: Nacionalista (1949–1978)
- Spouse: Ester Sinsuat
- Education: José Rizal College

Datu Blah Tawapa Sinsuat (Jawi: بلاه تي سينسوات; December 27, 1908 – December 11, 1984) was a Filipino politician.

== Early life and education ==
Sinsuat was born in Dinaig (now Datu Odin Sinsuat), Cotabato (then a district of the former Moro Province) to former senator Datu Sinsuat Balabaran and Bai Pinagtayon.

He graduated from José Rizal College in 1934 with a Bachelor of Science in Commerce. In the same year, he was elected as one of the delegates to the 1934 Constitutional Convention representing Cotabato's lone district.

== Political career ==
Sinsuat successfully ran for the House of Representatives in 1949, representing Cotabato's at-large district in the 2nd Congress until 1953. He made an unsuccessful bid to return to the House in 1969, losing to incumbent Liberal representative Salipada Pendatun. Sinsuat contested the election before the Supreme Court, resulting in the 1970 case Sinsuat v. Pendatun.

Sinsuat later joined the ruling Kilusang Bagong Lipunan of President Ferdinand Marcos and ran for the Interim Batasang Pambansa in 1978, placing seventh among 23 candidates contesting eight seats. He was also elected speaker pro tempore of the assembly in November 1981.

== Death and legacy ==
Sinsuat died on December 11, 1984.

The municipality of Datu Blah T. Sinsuat in Maguindanao del Norte was later named in his honor.

== Electoral history ==
Electoral history of Blah T. Sinsuat
Year	Office	Party	Votes received				Result
Year	Office	Party	Total	%	P.	Swing	Result
1934	Constitutional Convention Delegate (Cotabato)	Nonpartisan	—N/a	—N/a	—N/a	—N/a	Won
1949	Representative (Cotabato at-large)	Nacionalista	—N/a	—N/a	1st	—N/a	Won
1969	Representative (Cotabato at-large)	Nacionalista	—N/a	—N/a	2nd	—N/a	Lost
1978	Assemblyman (Region XII)	KBL	269,905	6.58%	7th	—N/a	Won

Political offices
Preceded by Jose Aldeguer (as speaker pro tempore of the House of Representatives)	Speaker pro tempore of the Batasang Pambansa; 1981 – 1984	Succeeded by Salipada Pendatun
Preceded by Gumbay Piang	Member of the Philippine House of Representatives for Cotabato's at-large district 1949 – 1953	Succeeded by Luminog Mangelen
