= Jose Aldeguer =

Filipino lawyer and politician

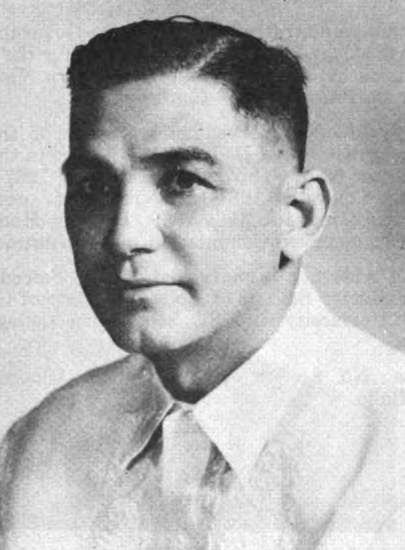
- Official portrait during the 6th Congress

Speaker pro tempore of the House of Representatives of the Philippines
- In office February 2, 1967 – January 17, 1973
- Speaker: Jose Laurel Jr. Cornelio Villareal
- Preceded by: Salipada Pendatun
- Succeeded by: Blah T. Sinsuat (as speaker pro tempore of the Batasang Pambansa)

House Majority Leader
- In office January 27, 1958 – December 30, 1961
- Speaker: Daniel Romualdez
- Preceded by: Arturo Tolentino
- Succeeded by: Justiniano Montano

Member of the Philippine House of Representatives from Iloilo's 5th district
- In office December 30, 1949 – January 17, 1973
- Preceded by: Juan Borra
- Succeeded by: District abolished (seat next held by Niel Tupas Sr. in 1987)

Member of the Batasang Bayan
- In office September 21, 1976 – June 12, 1978

Member of the 1934 Constitutional Convention for Iloilo's 5th district
- In office July 30, 1934 – February 8, 1935

Personal details
- Born: Jose Martinez Aldeguer; September 1, 1908 Sara, Iloilo, Philippine Islands
- Died: September 3, 1991 (aged 83) Cubao, Quezon City, Philippines
- Party: Nacionalista (1949–1953; 1957–1973)
- Other political affiliations: Democratic (1953–1957)
- Spouse: Esther Salcedo
- Children: 1
- Education: Colegio de San Agustin; Ateneo de Manila University; University of the Philippines (LLB)
- Profession: Lawyer

Jose Martinez Aldeguer (September 1, 1908 – September 3, 1991) was a Filipino lawyer and politician who served as the longest-serving representative of Iloilo's 5th congressional district in the House of Representatives, serving for 24 years. He was also the last speaker pro tempore of the House before Congress was abolished in 1973 following the declaration of martial law.

== Early life and education ==
Aldeguer was born in Sara, Iloilo, on September 1, 1908, to Mateo Aldeguer and Enriqueta Martinez. He attended Colegio de San Agustin for his primary education and later enrolled at Ateneo de Manila University for his secondary and collegiate studies, graduating summa cum laude with an Associate in Arts degree. He subsequently studied at the University of the Philippines, where he earned his Bachelor of Laws degree. He placed 13th in the 1933 Bar examinations.

== Career ==
=== Early career (1934–1949) ===
In 1934, Aldeguer was elected as one of Iloilo's delegates to the Constitutional Convention. During the Japanese occupation, he served as deputy governor of the ninth administrative district of the free guerrilla government in Panay and Romblon. Following the liberation of the Philippines, he served as secretary of the Iloilo Provincial Board.

=== House of Representatives (1949–1973) ===
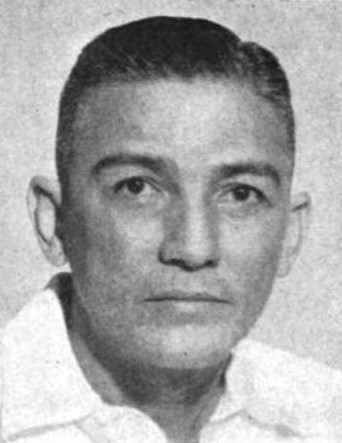
Aldeguer's official portrait during the 3rd Congress

Aldeguer was elected in 1949 to represent Iloilo's 5th congressional district in the House of Representatives under the Nacionalista Party. He joined the Democratic Party in 1953, when he won a second term, before returning to the Nacionalista Party in 1957. He was subsequently re-elected to four consecutive terms, serving until his tenure was cut short by the declaration of martial law and the subsequent adoption of the 1973 Constitution, which abolished Congress. Aldeguer held several leadership positions in the House, including majority floor leader and chairperson of the House Committee on Rules during the 4th Congress from 1958 to 1961, and speaker pro tempore during the 6th and 7th Congresses from 1967 to 1973.

=== Batasang Bayan (1976–1978) ===
In 1976, Aldeguer was appointed by Ferdinand Marcos to the Batasang Bayan, a legislative advisory council to the president.

== Personal life ==
Aldeguer was married to Esther Salcedo, with whom he had a daughter, Sonia. He died of congestive heart failure on September 3, 1991, at the age of 83, in Quezon City.

== Electoral history ==
Electoral history of Jose Aldeguer
Year	Office	Party	Votes received				Result
Year	Office	Party	Total	%	P.	Swing	Result
1934	Constitutional Convention Delegate (Iloilo)	Nonpartisan	—N/a	—N/a	—N/a	—N/a	Won
1949	Representative (Iloilo–5th)	Nacionalista	—N/a	—N/a	1st	—N/a	Won
1953	Representative (Iloilo–5th)	Democratic	19,727	59.12%	1st	—N/a	Won
1957	Representative (Iloilo–5th)	Nacionalista	—N/a	—N/a	1st	—N/a	Won
1961	Representative (Iloilo–5th)	Nacionalista	—N/a	—N/a	1st	—N/a	Won
1965	Representative (Iloilo–5th)	Nacionalista	29,396	57.81%	1st	—N/a	Won
1969	Representative (Iloilo–5th)	Nacionalista	—N/a	—N/a	1st	—N/a	Won

House of Representatives of the Philippines
Preceded by Salipada Pendatun	Speaker pro tempore of the House of Representatives of the Philippines; February 2, 1967 – January 17, 1973	Succeeded by Blah T. Sinsuat (as speaker pro tempore of the Batasang Pambansa)
Preceded by Arturo Tolentino	House Majority Leader; January 27, 1958 – December 30, 1961	Succeeded by Justiniano Montano
Preceded by Juan Borra	Member of the Philippine House of Representatives for Iloilo's 5th district June 24, 1970 – January 17, 1973	Vacant Martial law and adoption of the 1973 Constitution Title next held by Niel Tupas Sr.
