= Region XII's at-large parliamentary district =

Former Philippine parliamentary district

- Former constituency for the Interim Batasang Pambansa

Former constituency
- Created: 1978
- Abolished: 1984
- Seats: 8

Region XII's at-large parliamentary district (also known as Central Mindanao's at-large parliamentary district) was a constituency for the Interim Batasang Pambansa, the legislature of the Philippines from 1978 to 1984. It encompassed the provinces of Lanao del Norte, Lanao del Sur, Maguindanao, North Cotabato, and Sultan Kudarat, together with the cities of Cotabato, Iligan, and Marawi.

The district had 8 seats in the assembly, 7 of which were held by members of the ruling party Kilusang Bagong Lipunan.

== List of assemblymen representing the district ==
=== Batasang Pambansa (1978–1986) ===
Portrait	Member (Lifespan) (Province/City)	Term of office	Party	Legislature	Electoral history	Constituencies
District established February 7, 1978.
	Jesus Amparo (Cotabato)	June 12, 1978 – June 30, 1984	KBL	Interim Batasang Pambansa	Elected in 1978.	1978–1984; Provinces: Lanao del Norte, Lanao del Sur, Maguindanao, North Cotabato, Sultan Kudarat Cities: Cotabato, Iligan, Marawi
	Anacleto Badoy Jr. (Cotabato City)	June 12, 1978 – June 30, 1984	KBL	Interim Batasang Pambansa	Elected in 1978.	1978–1984; Provinces: Lanao del Norte, Lanao del Sur, Maguindanao, North Cotabato, Sultan Kudarat Cities: Cotabato, Iligan, Marawi
	Tomas Baga Jr. (1934–2026) (Cotabato City)	June 12, 1978 – June 30, 1984	KBL	Interim Batasang Pambansa	Elected in 1978.	1978–1984; Provinces: Lanao del Norte, Lanao del Sur, Maguindanao, North Cotabato, Sultan Kudarat Cities: Cotabato, Iligan, Marawi
	Abdullah Dimaporo (born 1949) (Lanao del Norte)	June 12, 1978 – June 30, 1984	KBL	Interim Batasang Pambansa	Elected in 1978.	1978–1984; Provinces: Lanao del Norte, Lanao del Sur, Maguindanao, North Cotabato, Sultan Kudarat Cities: Cotabato, Iligan, Marawi
	Ahdel Pangandaman (Marawi City)	June 12, 1978 – June 30, 1984	KBL	Interim Batasang Pambansa	Elected in 1978.	1978–1984; Provinces: Lanao del Norte, Lanao del Sur, Maguindanao, North Cotabato, Sultan Kudarat Cities: Cotabato, Iligan, Marawi
	Ernesto Roldan (Cotabato)	June 12, 1978 – June 30, 1984	Konsensiya ng Bayan	Interim Batasang Pambansa	Elected in 1978.	1978–1984; Provinces: Lanao del Norte, Lanao del Sur, Maguindanao, North Cotabato, Sultan Kudarat Cities: Cotabato, Iligan, Marawi
	Blah T. Sinsuat (1908–1984) (Cotabato City)	June 12, 1978 – June 30, 1984	KBL	Interim Batasang Pambansa	Elected in 1978.	1978–1984; Provinces: Lanao del Norte, Lanao del Sur, Maguindanao, North Cotabato, Sultan Kudarat Cities: Cotabato, Iligan, Marawi
	Estanislao Valdez (Sultan Kudarat)	June 12, 1978 – June 30, 1984	KBL	Interim Batasang Pambansa	Elected in 1978.	1978–1984; Provinces: Lanao del Norte, Lanao del Sur, Maguindanao, North Cotabato, Sultan Kudarat Cities: Cotabato, Iligan, Marawi
District dissolved into Cotabato's at-large, Iligan's at-large, Lanao del Norte's at-large, Lanao del Sur's at-large, Maguindanao's at-large, and Sultan Kudarat's at-large districts.

== Election results ==
=== 1978 ===
Candidate	Party	Votes	%
Estanislao Valdez	KBL	319,514	7.79
Abdullah Dimaporo	BLKNNL	289,751	7.06
Jesus Amparo	KBL	286,180	6.98
Anacleto Badoy Jr.	KBL	285,985	6.97
Tomas Baga Jr.	KBL	271,473	6.62
Ahdel Sambulayang Pangandaman	KBL	271,393	6.62
Blah T. Sinsuat	KBL	269,905	6.58
Ernesto Roldan	Independent	268,287	6.54
Linang Mandangan	Independent	251,226	6.12
Sergio Tocao	Nacionalista	229,224	5.59
Ciscolario Diaz	Independent	187,986	4.58
Tomatic Aratuc	Independent	183,316	4.47
Fred Tamula	Nacionalista	177,270	4.32
Bonifacio Legaspi	Independent	171,564	4.18
Mangontawar Guro	Nacionalista	163,449	3.98
Nemesio Loma	Independent	129,450	3.16
Malamama Macapeges	Independent	116,651	2.84
Wilfredo Jolipa	Nacionalista	109,097	2.66
Hadji Hassan Tiboron	Independent	39,648	0.97
Felipe Balingit	Independent	39,624	0.97
Bartolome Presto	KBL	22,212	0.54
Darosalam Maongco	Samahan Nayon and Cooperative	12,542	0.31
Nimbalawag Barani	Independent	6,415	0.16
Total		4,102,162	100.00
Total votes		779,246	–
Registered voters/turnout		956,234	81.49
