= Governor of Cotabato =

Local chief executive

- Gobernador ng Lalawigan ng Cotabato (in Tagalog)
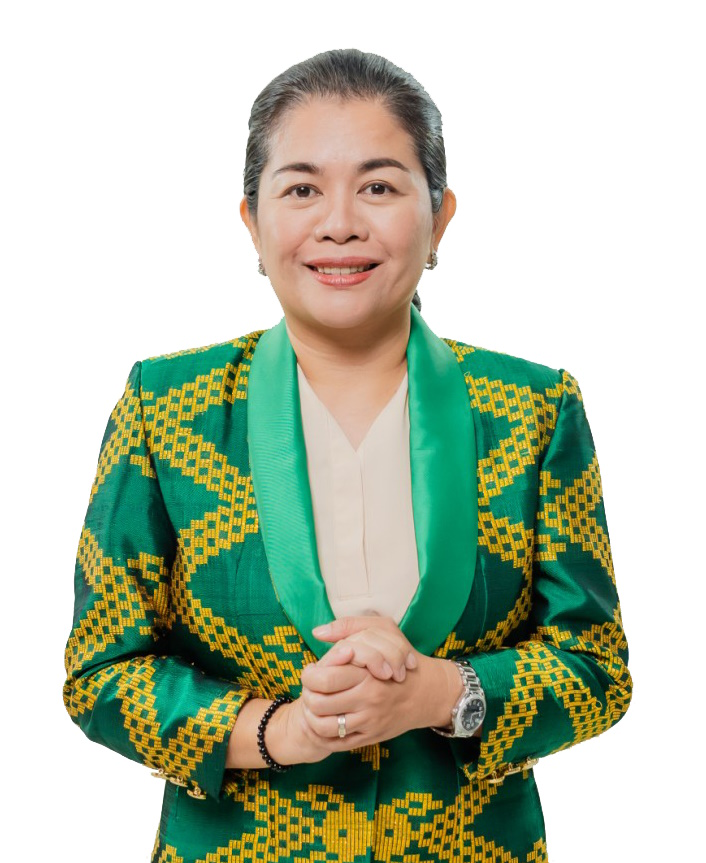
- Incumbent; Emmylou Taliño-Mendoza since June 30, 2022
- Term length: 3 years
- Inaugural holder: Frank W. Carpenter
- Formation: September 1, 1914

The governor of Cotabato is the executive leader of the province of Cotabato of the Philippines.

Prior to the establishment of Cotabato as a province on September 1, 1914, the area covered by the historical Province of Cotabato was governed by District Governors which were all American members of the Philippine Constabulary. Before 1914 (1899-1913), all of the district governors had the rank of major except for Don Ramon Vilo who governed the area in 1898. Cotabato received its first Civil Governor in 1941.

== List ==
No.	Image	Governor	Office
1		Frank W. Carpenter	1914–1917
2		C. B. Carter	1918–1919
3		Jose M. Unson	1920–1921
4		Dionesio Gutierrez	1922–1937
5		Jose M. Cui	1938–1940
6		Alfonso Pablo	1940–1941
7		Datu Duma Sinsuat	1942–1944
8		Marcelino Concha	1944
9		Salipada K. Pendatun	1944–1945
10		Datu Ugalingan Piang	1945–1946
11		Datu Udtog Matalam	1946–1949
12		Datu Duma Sinsuat	1949–1954
13		Primitivo Buagas	1954–1955
14		Datu Udtog Matalam	1956–1967
15		Simeon Datumanong	1968–1971
16		Carlos Cajelo	1972–1984
17		Nicolas Dequiña	1984–1986
–		Rosario Diaz	1986–1987
–		Tito Gallo	December 1, 1987 – February 1, 1988
18		Rosario Diaz	February 2, 1988 – March 27, 1998
–		Agnes Amador	March 28, 1998 – June 30, 1998
19		Emmanuel Piñol	June 30, 1998 – June 30, 2007
20		Jesus Sacdalan	June 30, 2007 – June 30, 2010
21		Emmylou Taliño-Mendoza	June 30, 2010 – June 30, 2019
22		Nancy Catamco	June 30, 2019 – June 30, 2022
(21)		Emmylou Taliño-Mendoza	June 30, 2022 – present
