= Simeon Datumanong =

Filipino politician (1935–2017)

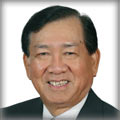

Member of the Philippine House of Representatives from Maguindanao's Lone District
- In office June 30, 2007 – June 30, 2010
- Preceded by: Post established
- Succeeded by: Post dissolved

Member of the Philippine House of Representatives from Maguindanao's 2nd District
- In office June 30, 2010 – June 30, 2013
- Preceded by: Post recreated
- Succeeded by: Datu Zajid G. Mangudadatu
- In office June 30, 2004 – June 30, 2007
- Preceded by: Guimid Matalam
- Succeeded by: Post dissolved into Maguindanao's at-large congressional district
- In office June 30, 1992 – January 20, 2001
- Preceded by: Guimid Matalam
- Succeeded by: Guimid Matalam

Deputy Speaker of the House of Representatives
- In office July 23, 2007 – June 30, 2010
- In office 1995 – June 30, 1998

53rd Secretary of Justice
- In office January 16, 2003 – December 23, 2003
- President: Gloria Macapagal Arroyo
- Preceded by: Merceditas Gutierrez
- Succeeded by: Merceditas Gutierrez

Secretary of Public Works and Highways
- In office January 20, 2001 – January 15, 2003
- President: Gloria Macapagal Arroyo
- Preceded by: Gregorio Vigilar
- Succeeded by: Bayani Fernando

Mambabatas Pambansa (Assemblyman) from Maguindanao
- In office June 30, 1984 – March 25, 1986 Serving with Salipada Pendatun (1984–1985)

Governor of Maguindanao
- In office 1973–1975
- Preceded by: Office created
- Succeeded by: Zacaria Candao

Governor of Cotabato
- In office December 30, 1967 – December 30, 1971
- Preceded by: Datu Udtog Matalam
- Succeeded by: Carlos Cajelo

Vice Governor of Cotabato
- In office December 30, 1963 – December 30, 1967
- Governor: Datu Udtog Matalam

Personal details
- Born: June 17, 1935 Cotabato, Philippine Commonwealth
- Died: February 28, 2017 (aged 81) Quezon City, Philippines
- Party: Lakas (1998–2017)
- Other political affiliations: KBL (1984-1986)

Simeon Ampatuan Datumanong (June 17, 1935 – February 28, 2017) was a Filipino Muslim politician who held different government positions including being a representative of the lone district of Maguindanao in the House of Representatives of the Philippines. He was married to Hadja Sittie Mariam Sigrid de Guzman Datumanong and had four children.

== Education ==
He finished elementary school as the class valedictorian at Cotabato Central School in Cotabato City on 1949. He was the first honorable mention when he finished his high school studies at Cotabato High School. Right after finishing high school, he took up Bachelor of Laws at the University of the Philippines College of Law. He was admitted to the Bar in 1959.

== Political career ==
Datumanong entered politics when he was elected as Vice-Governor (1963–1967) then as Governor (1967–1971) of Cotabato. When the province of Cotabato was split to the provinces of Maguindanao, Sultan Kudarat, and North Cotabato, he was elected as the first governor of Maguindanao in 1973 and served until 1975. He was then elected to the Regular Batasang Pambansa from Maguindanao in 1984. In 1992, Datumanong was elected to the Philippine House of Representatives to represent Maguindanao's Second District. He served until 2001 when he was appointed by President Gloria Macapagal Arroyo as Secretary of Public Works and Highways. In 2003, he was Secretary of Justice and served until his resignation in the same year. He was reelected to the Philippine House of Representatives in 2007.

House of Representatives of the Philippines
Preceded by Guimid Matalam	Representative, 2nd District of Maguindanao; 1992–2001	Vacant Title next held by Guimid Matalam
Preceded by Guimid Matalam	Representative, 2nd District of Maguindanao; 2004–2007	District dissolved
Recreated	Representative, Lone District of Maguindanao; 2007–2010	District dissolved
Recreated	Representative, 2nd District of Maguindanao; 2010–2013	Succeeded by Zajid G. Mangudadatu
Political offices
New office	Governor of Maguindanao; 1973–1975	Succeeded by Zacaria A. Candao
Preceded by Ma. Merceditas N. Gutierrez	Secretary of Justice; 2003	Succeeded by Ma. Merceditas N. Gutierrez
Preceded by Gregorio Vigilar	Secretary of Public Works and Highways; 2001–2003	Succeeded by Florante Soriquez
