= Salipada Pendatun =

Filipino lawyer and politician (1912–1985)

Salipada Khalid Pendatun سلڤاد خالد ڤندتن
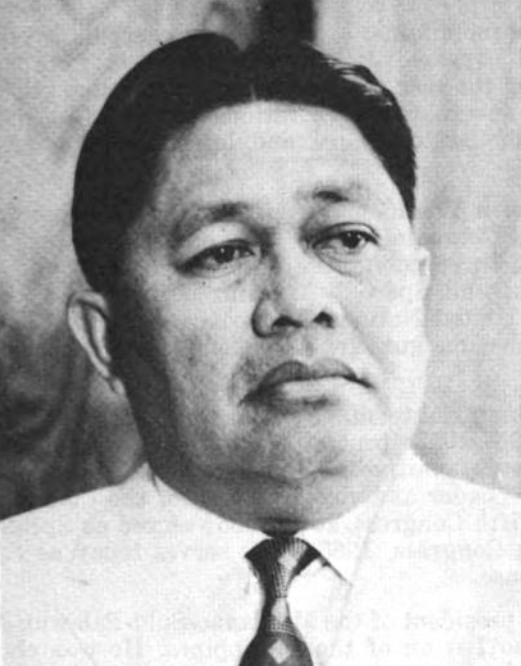
- Pendatun's official portrait during the 6th Congress

Speaker pro tempore of the Batasang Pambansa
- In office July 23, 1984 – January 27, 1985
- Speaker: Nicanor Yñiguez
- Preceded by: Blah T. Sinsuat
- Succeeded by: Macacuna Dimaporo

Member of the Batasang Pambansa from Maguindanao
- In office June 30, 1984 – January 27, 1985 Serving with Simeon Datumanong

Member of the Philippine House of Representatives for Cotabato's at-large district
- In office December 30, 1957 – January 17, 1973
- Preceded by: Luminog Mangelen
- Succeeded by: District abolished (seat next held by Tomas Baga Jr. and Carlos Cajelo in 1984)

Speaker pro tempore of the House of Representatives of the Philippines
- In office March 8, 1962 – February 2, 1967
- Speaker: Cornelio Villareal
- Preceded by: Constancio Castañeda
- Succeeded by: Jose Aldeguer

Senator of the Philippines
- In office May 25, 1946 – December 30, 1949

Governor of Cotabato
- In office 1944–1945
- Preceded by: Marcelino Concha
- Succeeded by: Datu Ugalingan Piang

Personal details
- Born: December 3, 1912 (age 113) Pikit, Moro Province, Philippine Islands
- Died: January 27, 1985 (aged 72) Quezon City, Philippines
- Party: KBL (1978–1985); Liberal (1946–1953; 1957–1973); Nacionalista (1953–1957)
- Spouse(s): Bai Matabay Plang (pre-war); Aida Farrales
- Children: 5
- Education: University of the Philippines College of Law
- Occupation: Lawyer
- Profession: Politician
- Nickname: Sali

Military service
- Allegiance: Philippine Commonwealth
- Branch/service: Philippine Army; Philippine Constabulary
- Years of service: 1942–1945
- Rank: Brigadier general
- Commands: 102nd Regiment
- Battles/wars: World War II; Battle of Maguindanao

Datu Salipada Khalid Pendatun (Maguindanaon pronunciation: [salɪpaːda 'xaːlɪd pəndatʊn]; Jawi: سلڤاد خالد ڤندتن; December 3, 1912 – January 27, 1985) was a Filipino lawyer, military officer, and politician, being the first Filipino Muslim in history to hold these offices.

Born in Pikit, Moro Province (now Cotabato), Pendatun graduated from the University of the Philippines College of Law in 1938 and passed the bar exam in the same year. During World War II, Pendatun was a member of the United States Army Forces in the Far East (USAFFE), and led a guerrilla group in Mindanao called the Bolo Battalion (later known as the Bukidnon-Cotabato Force).

As a member of the Liberal Party's senatorial slate in the 1971 Senate election, Pendatun was among the survivors of the Plaza Miranda bombing in August 1971. After martial law was declared in 1972 by President Ferdinand Marcos and the Moro conflict intensified, Pendatun went into self-exile in Saudi Arabia in 1976. He later returned to the Philippines in 1980 after a brief stay in San Francisco.

In 1984, Pendatun won election to the Batasang Pambansa (lit. 'National Assembly') under the administration's Kilusang Bagong Lipunan party, serving as assemblyman for Maguindanao and as speaker pro tempore from 1984 until his death from an automobile accident in January 1985.

== Early life and education ==
Better known as “Sali” to friends, he was born in Pikit, Cotabato, on December 3, 1912. He completed his elementary and high school education in Cotabato, obtained his Associate in Arts degree in 1934 and Bachelor of Laws degree in 1938, both from the University of the Philippines, and passed the bar examination also in 1938.

== Military career ==
=== World War II (1942–1945) ===
Pendatun fought against the Japanese during World War II, forming a group called the Bolo Battalion, which evolved into the larger group, the Muslim-Christian Guerrilla Movement and later, the Bukidnon-Cotabato Force. He with his friend, Domocao Alonto, who would later also become a senator, in Lanao del Sur, established the Ansar El Islam (Helpers of Islam) along with Sayyid Sharif captain Kalingalan Caluang, Rashid Lucman, Hamid Kamlian, Udtog Matalam, and lawyer Macapantun Abbas Jr. Accordingly, it was regarded as a "mass movement for the preservation and development of Islam in the Philippines".

During World War II, as a USAFFE officer, Pendatun organized and commanded the 102nd Regiment under the 101st Division of the Philippine Army/Constabulary from 1942 to 1943 in the following operations. He prevented the total destruction of the regiment during the Japanese invasion of Mindanao in early 1942. As part of the guerrilla movement, he launched an assault on Japanese garrison in Pikit in September 1942 and led a raid on the Japanese garrison at Kabacan on October 25, 1942. He also eliminated the Japanese garrison at Kitaotao, Bukidnon on December 4, 1942 and rescued Filipino prisoners of war at Casisang, Bukidnon on December 24, 1942 and led a two-month siege on a Japanese garrison at Malaybalay, Bukidnon on January 11, 1943. For his accomplishments, Pendatun was promoted to Brigadier General and was awarded the Distinguished Conduct Star, the second highest military decoration given to AFP Personnel.

== Political career ==
=== Governor of Cotabato (1944–1945) ===
During his tenure as governor of the then-undivided Cotabato province, Cotabato was by then the most prosperous province in the country, serving it as its "rice basket", with its capital bearing the same name second only to Davao City as the most populous and economically prosperous city in Mindanao. Several towns were born in the province, and a number of them, i.e. Kidapawan, Buayan (now General Santos), Marbel, Tacurong, and some others flourished and became economically prosperous that they become cities several years later. The province was also exceptionally peaceful before the Muslim insurgencies in Mindanao in the 1970s.

=== Senate (1946–1949) ===
Together with former Senator Lorenzo Tañada, he was among the other 22 senators who voted against then President Manuel Roxas’ amnesty proclamation for the collaborators of World War II. During his three-year term in the Senate, Pendatun was chairman of the following important committees: Army, Navy and Military Pensions; Corporations, Banks and Franchises; and Special Organized Provinces. He had also served as official member to various international conferences, including the United Nations in Paris and New York and represented the Philippine Government at the inauguration of Indonesian Independence in Jakarta in 1949.

=== Quirino cabinet and later career (1950–1985) ===
He later served as President Elpidio Quirino's technical adviser from 1950–1953, representative for Cotabato's at-large congressional district from 1957 to 1973, and member of the Regular Batasang Pambansa from Maguindanao from 1984 until his death in 1985.

== Death ==
Pendatun died on January 27, 1985, at the Philippine Heart Center in Quezon City after figuring in a road accident.

== Legacy ==
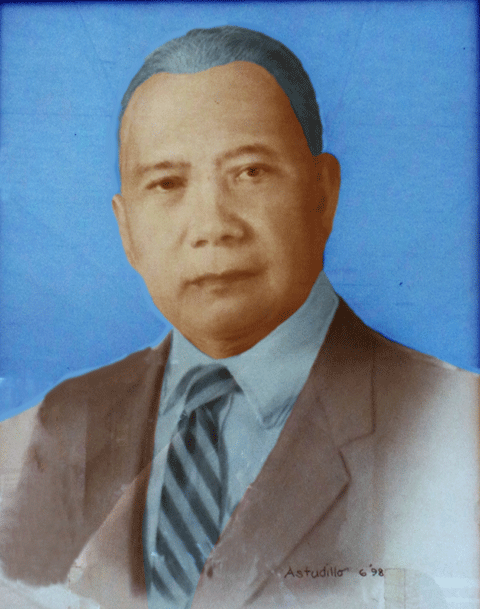
Portrait of Salipada Pendatun

The town of General Salipada K. Pendatun, Maguindanao del Sur, Pendatun Avenue in Maharlika Village in Taguig, as well as in General Santos City, and the Philippine National Police regional headquarters in Parang, Maguindanao del Norte were named after him.

House of Representatives of the Philippines
Preceded by Blah T. Sinsuat	Speaker pro tempore of the Batasang Pambansa; July 23, 1984 – January 27, 1985	Succeeded by Macacuna Dimaporo
New district	Member of the Batasang Pambansa from Maguindanao; June 30, 1984 – January 27, 1985; With: Simeon Datumanong	District abolished
Preceded by Constancio Castañeda	Speaker pro tempore of the House of Representatives of the Philippines; March 8, 1962 – February 2, 1967	Succeeded by Jose Aldeguer
Preceded by Luminog Mangelen	Member of the Philippine House of Representatives for Cotabato's at-large district December 30, 1957 – January 17, 1973	District abolished
Political offices
Preceded by Marcelino Concha	Governor of Cotabato; 1944–1945	Succeeded by Datu Ugalingan Piang
