= Maguindanao's at-large congressional district =

Legislative district of the Philippines

Maguindanao's at-large congressional district was a short-lived congressional district that encompassed the formerly undivided province of Maguindanao in the Philippines. It was represented in the Batasang Pambansa from 1984 to 1986. Maguindanao was created by the further division of Cotabato into three provinces in 1973 out of thirteen ethnic Maguindanao-dominated municipalities of the former province. Due to the absence of a legislature since the 1972 imposition of martial law, no electoral district was formed in the new province under its charter. When a national parliament known as the Batasang Pambansa was convened in 1978, Maguindanao and four other provinces in Central Mindanao were collectively represented by eight delegates who were elected across Region XII. The only time a provincewide at-large district was used to elect representatives for Maguindanao was during the 1984 Philippine parliamentary election for two seats in the Regular Batasang Pambansa shared with the chartered city of Cotabato.

The district was eliminated following the 1987 apportionment which created two districts in the province of Maguindanao under a new constitution. It briefly resurfaced after the province's 1st district was carved out to form the short-lived province of Shariff Kabunsuan in 2006 leaving the 2nd district as the sole constituency in what remained of the province for the 2007 Philippine House of Representatives elections. A 2008 decision by the Supreme Court nullified the new province and Maguindanao reverted to two-district configuration by the 2010 Philippine House of Representatives elections.

== Representation history ==
#	Term of office		Batasang Pambansa	Seat A				Seat B			
#	Start	End	Batasang Pambansa	Image	Member	Party	Electoral history	Image	Member	Party	Electoral history
=== Maguindanao's at-large district for the Regular Batasang Pambansa ===
District created February 1, 1984.
–	July 23, 1984	March 25, 1986	2nd		Simeon Datumanong	KBL	Elected in 1984.		Salipada Pendatun	KBL	Elected in 1984. Died January 27, 1985.
District dissolved into Maguindanao's 1st and 2nd districts.
#	Term of office		Congress	Single seat				Seats eliminated			
#	Start	End	Congress	Image	Member	Party	Electoral history	Seats eliminated			
=== Maguindanao's at-large district for the House of Representatives of the Philippines ===								Seats eliminated			
District re-created September 6, 2006.								Seats eliminated			
1	June 30, 2007	July 16, 2008	14th		Simeon Datumanong	Lakas	Redistricted from the 2nd district and re-elected in 2007. Redistricted to the 2nd district.	Seats eliminated			
District dissolved into Maguindanao's 2nd district.								Seats eliminated			

== See also ==
- Legislative districts of Maguindanao
