= Constancio Castañeda =

Filipino lawyer and politician

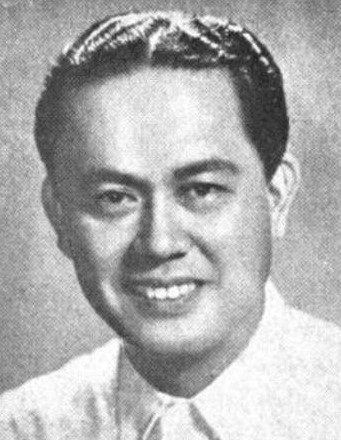
- Castañeda's official portrait during the 3rd Congress

Secretary/Minister of General Services
- In office February 8, 1970 – February 25, 1986
- President: Ferdinand Marcos
- Preceded by: Salih Ututalum
- Succeeded by: Victor San Andres Ziga

Speaker pro tempore of the House of Representatives of the Philippines
- In office January 27, 1958 – March 8, 1962
- Speaker: Daniel Romualdez
- Preceded by: Daniel Romualdez
- Succeeded by: Salipada Pendatun

Member of the Philippine House of Representatives from Tarlac's 2nd district
- In office December 30, 1953 – December 30, 1965
- Preceded by: Jose Feliciano
- Succeeded by: Jose Yap

Secretary General of the Nacionalista Party
- In office 1958–1978

Personal details
- Born: Constancio Emas Castañeda; May 13, 1913 La Paz, Tarlac, Philippine Islands
- Party: Nacionalista
- Spouse: Toribia Teodoro
- Children: 8
- Education: José Rizal College; University of Manila
- Profession: Lawyer; Professor

Constancio Emas Castañeda (May 13, 1913 – after 1986) was a Filipino lawyer, politician, and businessman. He served as secretary of general services under President Ferdinand Marcos and represented Tarlac's 2nd congressional district in the House of Representatives for three terms from 1953 to 1965. A prominent member of the Nacionalista Party, he was elected House speaker pro tempore during the 4th Congress.

== Early life and education ==
Castañeda was born on May 13, 1913, in La Paz, Tarlac, to former municipal mayor Engracio Castañeda. He studied at La Paz Elementary School and Tarlac High School for his primary and secondary education, respectively. He attended Jose Rizal College and later the University of Manila, where he received his Bachelor of Laws degree in 1938. He passed the bar examination in the same year.

== Career ==
=== Legal career ===
Castañeda served as a law professor at the University of Manila from 1940 to 1941 and at Arellano University from 1941 to 1949. During his legal practice, he became an associate attorney at the law firm of former Senate president Quintin Paredes. He also held key positions in several companies, including general manager of the Central Surety and Insurance Company, vice president of the Prudential Life and Insurance Company, and director of the Quezon Development Bank and the Philippine Reinsurance Corporation.

=== House of Representatives ===
Castañeda represented Tarlac's 2nd congressional district in the House of Representatives for three consecutive terms from 1953 to 1965 as a member of the Nacionalista Party. He was elected speaker pro tempore of the House under the speakership of Daniel Romualdez in 1958, serving until 1962, when Romualdez was ousted from the position in favor of Cornelio Villareal. Castañeda was succeeded as speaker pro tempore by Liberal representative Salipada Pendatun. During his tenure in the House, he championed measures on economic nationalism and authored laws including the creation of the Court of Tax Appeals, retail trade nationalization, salary increases for teachers and government employees, and measures relating to the health sector.

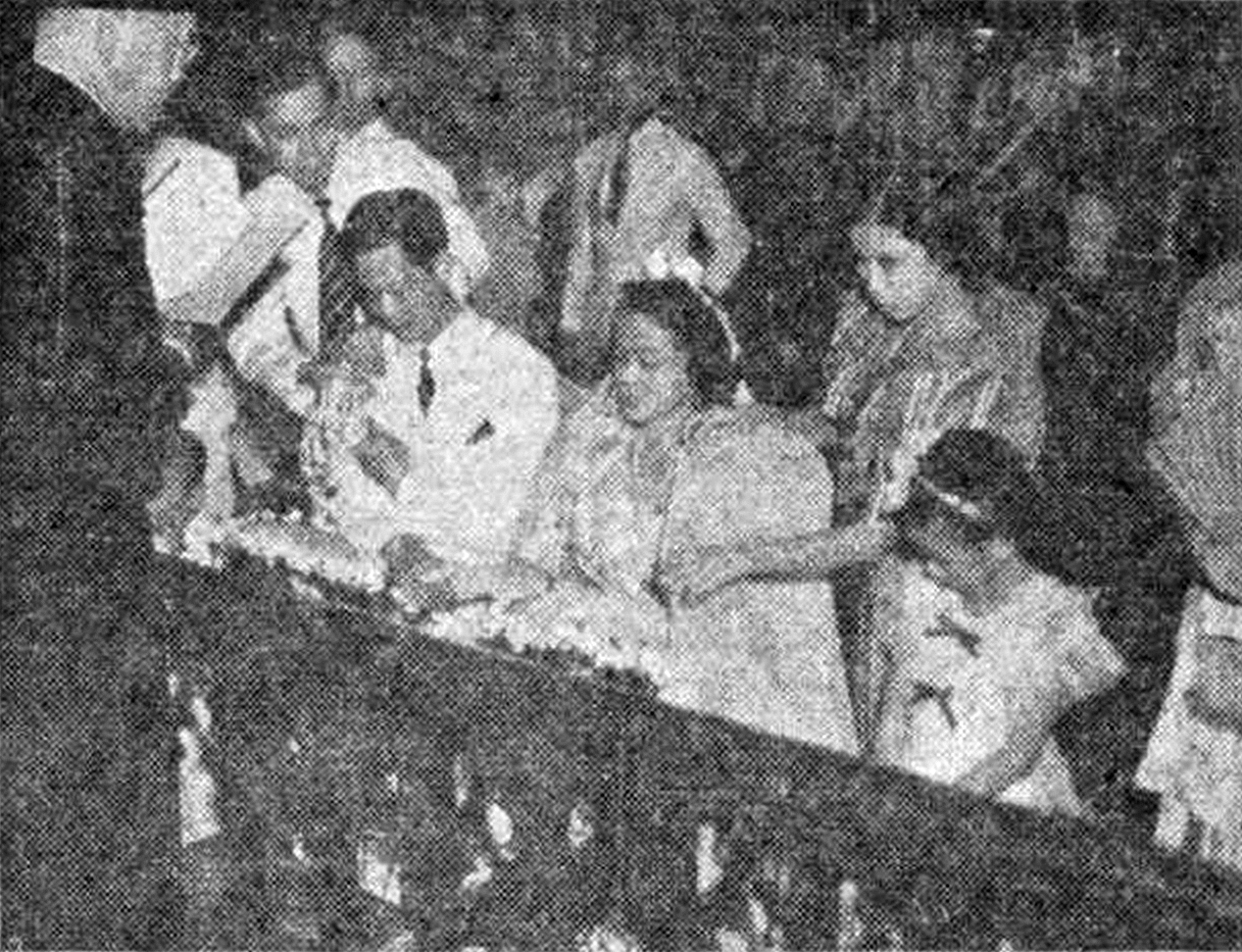
Wedding of Constancio Castañeda and Toribia Teodoro

=== Senatorial bid and Marcos administration ===
Castañeda ran for the Senate in 1965 under the Nacionalista ticket, but placed 11th and was defeated. He and Bartolome Cabangbang were the only Nacionalista candidates who lost in the election. He also served as secretary-general of the Nacionalista Party from 1951 to 1978.

Castañeda later served as administrator of the Office of Economic Coordination before being appointed by President Ferdinand Marcos as secretary of general services, a position that became minister of general services after 1978.

=== Personal life ===
Castañeda married Toribia Teodoro on June 29, 1939, with whom he had eight children.

== Electoral history ==
Electoral history of Constancio Castañeda
Year	Office	Party	Votes received				Result
Year	Office	Party	Total	%	P.	Swing	Result
1953	Representative (Tarlac–2nd)	Nacionalista	24,062	51.69%	1st	—N/a	Won
1957	Representative (Tarlac–2nd)	Nacionalista	—N/a	—N/a	1st	—N/a	Won
1961	Representative (Tarlac–2nd)	Nacionalista	—N/a	—N/a	1st	—N/a	Won
1965	Senator of the Philippines	Nacionalista	2,814,032	36.98%	11th	—N/a	Lost

House of Representatives of the Philippines
Preceded by Daniel Romualdez	Speaker pro tempore of the House of Representatives of the Philippines; January 27, 1958 – March 8, 1962	Succeeded by Salipada Pendatun
Preceded by Jose Feliciano	Representative, Tarlac's 2nd district December 30, 1953 – December 30, 1965	Succeeded by Jose Yap
Political offices
Preceded by Salih Ututalum	Secretary/Minister of General Services; February 8, 1970 – February 25, 1986	Succeeded by Victor San Andres Ziga
