= Cotabato's at-large congressional district =

Legislative district of the Philippines

Cotabato's at-large congressional district may refer to several instances when a provincewide at-large district was used for elections to Philippine national legislatures from the formerly undivided province of Cotabato before 1987.

The single-member district was first created ahead of the 1935 Philippine legislative election following the 1934 constitutional convention where voters in the province had been selected in electing a delegate for Cotabato. Cotabato had been admitted as a special province under the Department of Mindanao and Sulu since 1914 but was only previously represented through a multi-member delegation appointed by the Governor General covering all of Mindanao territory except Misamis and Surigao beginning in 1916. The district encompassed the entire territory formerly known as the Cotabato District that was previously organized under Moro Province in 1903 from the same Spanish politico-military district (Distrito Quinto de Cotabato) that existed since 1860. The Spanish district was earlier represented in the Malolos Congress of the nascent First Philippine Republic by two delegates from Luzon.

Datu Balabaran Sinsúat of the Nacionalista Demócrata Pro-Independencia was elected as the single-member district's first representative in 1935 by a select group of electors composed of municipal and municipal district presidents, vice-presidents and councilors, among others. The first time a representative from the province was elected through popular vote was during the succeeding 1938 Philippine legislative election after the passage of Commonwealth Act No. 44 in 1936 which removed the restrictions on qualified voters in the former Bureau of Non-Christian Tribes-designated jurisdiction.

Cotabato was also represented as a plural member constituency in the Second Republic National Assembly during the Pacific War. It reverted to single-member representation for the restored Commonwealth and Third Republic House of Representatives and continued to elect representatives even after 13 of its southern municipalities separated to form the province of South Cotabato in 1966. Following a shift to parliamentary system, districts were replaced by multi-member regional constituencies where Cotabato, further reduced and split into three provinces in 1973, was represented as part of Region XII's at-large district. When provincial and city district representation was restored in 1984, North Cotabato, which assumed the original Cotabato name, was represented by two delegates.

The district was dissolved after the province was apportioned two seats under the 1987 constitution.

== Representation history ==
#	Term of office		National Assembly	Seat A				Seat B			
#	Start	End	National Assembly	Image	Member	Party	Electoral history	Image	Member	Party	Electoral history
=== Cotabato's at-large district for the Malolos Congress ===
District created June 18, 1898.
–	September 15, 1898	March 23, 1901	1st		José M. Lerma	Independent	Appointed.		Pedro Layug Villaluz	Independent	Appointed.
#	Term of office		National Assembly	Single seat				Seats eliminated			
#	Start	End	National Assembly	Image	Member	Party	Electoral history	Seats eliminated			
=== Cotabato's at-large district for the National Assembly (Commonwealth of the Philippines) ===								Seats eliminated			
District re-created February 8, 1935.								Seats eliminated			
1	September 16, 1935	December 30, 1938	1st		Balabaran Sinsuat	Nacionalista; Demócrata Pro-Independencia	Elected in 1935.	Seats eliminated			
2	December 30, 1938	December 30, 1941	2nd		Ugalingan Piang	Nacionalista	Elected in 1938.	Seats eliminated			
#	Term of office		National Assembly	Seat A				Seat B			
#	Start	End	National Assembly	Image	Member	Party	Electoral history	Image	Member	Party	Electoral history
=== Cotabato's at-large district for the National Assembly (Second Philippine Republic) ===
District re-created September 7, 1943.
–	September 25, 1943	February 2, 1944	1st		Menandang Piang	KALIBAPI	Elected in 1943.		Alfonso A. Pablo	KALIBAPI	Appointed as an ex officio member.
#	Term of office		Common wealth Congress	Single seat				Seats eliminated			
#	Start	End	Common wealth Congress	Image	Member	Party	Electoral history	Seats eliminated			
=== Cotabato's at-large district for the House of Representatives of the Commonwealth of the Philippines ===								Seats eliminated			
District re-created May 24, 1945.								Seats eliminated			
(2)	June 9, 1945	May 25, 1946	1st		Ugalingan Piang	Nacionalista	Re-elected in 1941.	Seats eliminated			
#	Term of office		Congress	Single seat				Seats eliminated			
#	Start	End	Congress	Image	Member	Party	Electoral history	Seats eliminated			
=== Cotabato's at-large district for the House of Representatives of the Philippines ===								Seats eliminated			
3	May 25, 1946	November 19, 1949	1st		Gumbay Piang	Liberal	Elected in 1946. Died in office.	Seats eliminated			
4	December 30, 1949	December 30, 1953	2nd		Blah T. Sinsuat	Nacionalista	Elected in 1949.	Seats eliminated			
5	December 30, 1953	December 30, 1957	3rd		Luminog Mangelen	Nacionalista	Elected in 1953.	Seats eliminated			
6	December 30, 1957	September 23, 1972	4th		Salipada Pendatun	Nacionalista	Elected in 1957.	Seats eliminated			
6	December 30, 1957	September 23, 1972	5th		Salipada Pendatun	Liberal	Re-elected in 1961.	Seats eliminated			
6	December 30, 1957	September 23, 1972	6th		Salipada Pendatun	Liberal	Re-elected in 1965.	Seats eliminated			
6	December 30, 1957	September 23, 1972	7th		Salipada Pendatun	Liberal	Re-elected in 1969. Removed from office after imposition of martial law.	Seats eliminated			
District dissolved into the eight-seat Region XII's at-large district for the Interim Batasang Pambansa.								Seats eliminated			
#	Term of office		Batasang Pambansa	Seat A				Seat B			
#	Start	End	Batasang Pambansa	Image	Member	Party	Electoral history	Image	Member	Party	Electoral history
=== Cotabato's at-large district for the Regular Batasang Pambansa ===
District re-created February 1, 1984.
–	July 23, 1984	March 25, 1986	2nd		Tomas B. Baga Jr.	KBL	Elected in 1984.		Carlos B. Cajelo	KBL	Elected in 1984.
District dissolved into Cotabato's 1st and 2nd districts.

== See also ==
- Legislative districts of Cotabato
