= Moro Province =

Former province of the Philippines

Moro Province Provincia Mora مقاطعة مورو
- Province of the Philippines
- 1903-1914
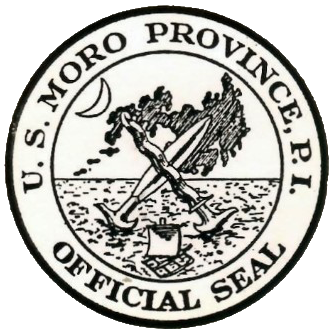
- Seal

- Location of the historical Moro Province.
- Capital: Zamboanga
- Historical era: American colonial period
  - Established: June 1 1903
  - Disestablished: July 23 1914
- Political subdivisions: 5 Districts and 1 Sub-district; Cotabato; Davao; Lanao; Zamboanga (with Dapitan Sub-district); Sulu
Preceded by
Cotabato
Davao
Misamis
Surigao
Zamboanga
Sultanate of Sulu
Sultanate of Maguindanao
Confederate States of Lanao
Republic of Zamboanga
Sultanate of Buayan
Succeeded by
Department of Mindanao and Sulu
Davao
Cotabato
Lanao
Sulu
Zamboanga
- Today part of: · Basilan · Cotabato · Davao del Norte · Davao de Oro · Davao del Sur · Davao Occidental · Davao Oriental · Lanao del Norte · Lanao del Sur · Maguindanao del Norte · Maguindanao del Sur · Sarangani · South Cotabato · Sulu · Tawi-Tawi · Zamboanga del Norte · Zamboanga del Sur · Zamboanga Sibugay

Moro Province was a province of the Philippines consisting of the regions of Zamboanga, Lanao, Cotabato, Davao, and Jolo. It was later split into provinces and regions organized under the Department of Mindanao and Sulu, along with the former province of Agusan and the current province of Bukidnon.

== History ==
After the dissolution of the Republic of Zamboanga and others part of Mindanao are under US rule, the US civil government led by Governor William Howard Taft authorized the creation of the Moro Province that includes "all of the territory of the Philippines lying south of the eight parallel of latitude, excepting the island of Palawan and the eastern portion of the northwest peninsula of Mindanao." Moro Province was created by the virtue of Act No. 787 on June 1, 1903. Major General Leonard Wood, with the capacity of commander of the Army Department of Mindanao-Sulu was appointed governor of the province on August 6, 1903.

The Moro Province provided chances to carry out the American mandate. Slavery was abolished, and the common people were protected from their traditional leaders and other threats. A tribal ward court system was created to introduce American justice. Selected Moro leaders gained limited power, while public works and education were expanded. Americans and Christian Filipinos were encouraged to settle in "Moroland" to help improve agriculture among Muslim Filipinos.

The response of the Moro people to U.S. military rule was mixed, with some groups supporting the U.S. while others resisted. This varied response is due to the diverse background of the Moros. Historian Patricio N. Abinales noted that the U.S. formed alliances with certain leaders in the divided Muslim communities, using a strategy of both suppression and cooperation. They drew from their experiences with Native Americans, allowing some collaborators to maintain arms and control their communities. Some alliances with Moro leaders worked out, but many did not. Moros continued to fight for their freedom, even after the Philippine-American war ended in 1902. The US military labeled the uprisings from 1903-1913 as "Moro rebellions". One significant event was the Bud Dajo massacre of 1906, where over 600 Moros, mostly women, were killed. The U.S. had better weapons while Moros mostly used blades and tried to get firearms. Given the circumstances, the Moro Rebellions were brutal killings of those who resisted.

=== Military to civilian government ===
By 1913, Governor John J. Pershing agreed that the Moro Province needed to transition to civil government. This was prompted by the Moros' personalistic approach to government, which was based on personal ties rather than a respect for an abstract office. To the Moros, a change of administration meant not just a change in leadership but a change in regime, and was a traumatic experience. Rotation within the military meant that each military governor could serve only for a limited time. Until 1911, every district governor and secretary had been a military officer. By November 1913, only one officer still held a civil office – Pershing himself. In December 1913, Pershing was replaced as governor of Moro Province by a civilian, Frank Carpenter.

=== Dissolution ===
On July 23, 1914, the Moro Province was officially replaced by an agency named the Department of Mindanao and Sulu including the whole island of Mindanao except Misamis and Surigao. The agency was tasked to administer all Muslim-dominated areas in the territory. Frank Carpenter remained as governor of the agency.

== Government ==
The province was governed under a civil government that has executive, judicial, and legislative branches and is divided into military districts.

The governor served also as the commander of the Army Department of Mindanao-Jolo. Most of the district governors and their deputies were members of the US military. In 1913, the military governor was replaced by a civil governor.

The Moro Council served as the legislative body of the province. The governor and its members were appointed by and with the consent of the Philippine Commission.

Justice was administered for the province by two (2) Courts of First Instance, Justice of the Peace Courts, and the Municipal Courts.

The province had its own Department of Public Instruction, separate from the education system that covered the rest of the Philippine Islands.

=== Districts ===
Five districts of Moro Province showed in colors

The province was divided into five districts, with US officers serving as district governors and deputy governors. These districts included: Cotabato, Davao, Lanao, Jolo, and Zamboanga. The district government is composed of the governor, the secretary, and the treasurer who were all appointed by the provincial governor.

The district officials also form as the District Board which had the power to enact ordinances although subject to the approval of the Legislative Council.

=== Tribal wards ===
The districts were sub-divided into tribal wards, with major datus serving as ward chiefs and minor datus serving as deputies, judges, and sheriffs.

The head of the tribe has the power to sub-divide his wards and appoint deputies into these sub-wards with the approval of the district governor.

=== Christian communities ===
The tribal wards were applied only to Muslim communities. Meanwhile, the minority Christian communities were merged into regular municipalities.

The government of each municipality was composed of a president, vice president, and a municipal council. The president and half of the councilors were elected by qualified voters and the other half is appointed by the district governor.

=== Governors ===
Governor	Term
Major General; Leonard Wood	July 25, 1903–April 16, 1906
Major General; Tasker Howard Bliss	April 16, 1906–February 3, 1909
Colonel; Ralph Hoyt	June 30, 1909–September 6, 1909
Captain; Charles Hagedon	September 6, 1909–November 9, 1909
Major General; John J. Pershing	November 9, 1909–December 15, 1913
Frank W. Carpenter	December 15, 1913–July 23, 1914

== See also ==
- Moro Rebellion
- Zamboanga City
- Cotabato City
- Davao
- Department of Mindanao and Sulu
