= List of places in the Philippines named after people =

Many Philippine placenames are derived either from a person who may have been associated with the founding of the place, or in honor of a notable person. If there is no citation for a place on this list, its etymology is usually described and referenced in the article about the person or the place.

== Provinces ==
- Aurora – Aurora Quezon, First Lady of the Philippines (1935–1944)
- Isabela – Queen Isabella II of Spain
- Quezon – Manuel L. Quezon, president of the Philippines (1935–1944)
- Quirino – Elpidio Quirino, president of the Philippines (1948–1953)
- Rizal – José Rizal, National hero
- Sultan Kudarat – Sultan Muhammad Dipatuan Kudarat

== Cities ==
- Alaminos, Pangasinan – Spanish Governor-General of the Philippines, Juan Alaminos y Vivar
- Dasmariñas, Cavite – Spanish Governor-General of the Philippines, Gómez Pérez Dasmariñas
- El Salvador, Misamis Oriental – "The Saviour", named after Jesus Christ
- General Santos – Paulino Santos, Commanding General of the Philippine Army (1936–1938) and Governor of Lanao (1936–1939)
- General Trias, Cavite – Filipino patriot Mariano Trías
- Isabela, Basilan – Queen Isabella II of Spain
- Lapu-Lapu, Cebu – Lapu-Lapu
- Legazpi, Albay – first Spanish Governor-General of the Philippines, Miguel López de Legazpi
- Marikina – Spanish Governor-General Félix Berenguer de Marquina
- Muñoz, Nueva Ecija – Francisco Muñoz, Spanish politician and former gobernadorcillo
- Ozamiz, Misamis Occidental – José Ozámiz, a Filipino politician
- Puerto Princesa, Palawan – Princess Eulalia of Spain
- Quezon City – Manuel L. Quezon, president of the Philippines (1935–1944)
- Roxas, Capiz – Manuel Roxas, president of the Philippines (1946–1948)
- San Carlos, Negros Occidental – Saint Charles Borromeo
- San Carlos, Pangasinan – Saint Charles Borromeo
- San Fernando, La Union – Saint Ferdinand, King of Spain
- San Fernando, Pampanga – Saint Ferdinand, King of Spain
- San Jose, Nueva Ecija – Saint Joseph
- San Jose del Monte, Bulacan – Saint Joseph
- San Juan, Metro Manila – Saint John the Baptist
- San Pablo, Laguna – Saint Paul the First Hermit
- San Pedro, Laguna – Saint Peter the Apostle
- Santa Rosa, Laguna – Saint Rose of Lima
- Santiago, Isabela – Saint James the Apostle
- Santo Tomas, Batangas – Saint Thomas Aquinas
- Trece Martires, Cavite – Thirteen Martyrs of Cavite
- Urdaneta, Pangasinan – Andrés de Urdaneta, Spanish friar, circumnavigator and explorer
- Valenzuela, Metro Manila – Filipino patriot Pío Valenzuela
- Victorias, Negros Occidental – Our Lady of Victories

== Municipalities ==
=== A ===
- Adams, Ilocos Norte – John Quincy Adams, President of the United States (1825–1829)
- Aglipay, Quirino – Gregorio Aglipay
- Agoncillo, Batangas – Felipe Agoncillo, Secretary of Interior (1923–1925)
- Aguilar, Pangasinan – Rafael María de Aguilar, Governor-General of the Philippines (1793–1806)
- Aguinaldo, Ifugao – Emilio Aguinaldo, 1st President of the Philippines
- Akbar, Basilan – Imam Akbar Marani, Islamic preacher
- Alamada, Cotabato – Datu Amaybulok Alamada, local chieftain
- Alaminos, Laguna – Juan Alaminos y Vivar, Governor-General of the Philippines (1873–1874)
- Alcala, Cagayan – Francisco de Paula Alcalá de la Torre, Governor-General of the Philippines (1843–1844)
- Alcantara, Romblon – Don Ciriaco Alcantara, a cabeza de barangay
- Alfonso, Cavite – King Alfonso XII of Spain
- Alfonso Castañeda, Nueva Vizcaya – Alfonso Castañeda, Governor of Nueva Vizcaya (1925–1928)
- Alfonso Lista, Ifugao – Alfonso Lista, town's first mayor
- Alicia, Bohol – Alicia Syquia Quirino, wife of President Elpidio Quirino
- Alicia, Isabela – Alicia Syquia Quirino, wife of President Elpidio Quirino
- Alicia, Zamboanga Sibugay – Alicia Syquia Quirino, wife of President Elpidio Quirino
- Allen, Northern Samar – Henry Tureman Allen, senior United States Army officer, Military Governor of Leyte
- Altavas, Aklan – Jose Altavas
- Amai Manabilang, Lanao del Sur
- Amadeo, Cavite – King Amadeo I of Spain
- Anda, Bohol – Spanish Governor-General Simón de Anda y Salazar
- Anda, Pangasinan – Spanish Governor-General Simón de Anda y Salazar
- Araceli, Palawan – Our Lady of the Altar of the Sky
- Arteche, Eastern Samar – Pedro Arteche, Filipino politician
- Asuncion, Davao del Norte – Our Lady of the Assumption
- Aurora, Isabela – First Lady Aurora Quezon
- Aurora, Zamboanga del Sur – First Lady Aurora Quezon

=== B ===
- Balagtas, Bulacan – Francisco Balagtas, Filipino poet and litterateur
- Ballesteros, Cagayan – Filipino priest Gregorio Ballesteros
- Barbaza, Antique – Spanish governor Enrique Barbaza
- Basco, Batanes – José Basco y Vargas, Governor-General of the Philippines (1778–1787)
- Bautista, Pangasinan – John the Baptist
- Benito Soliven, Isabela – Benito Soliven, member of the House of Representatives of the Philippines (1928–1931) and the National Assembly of the Philippines (1935–1941)
- Bonifacio, Misamis Occidental – Andrés Bonifacio, Filipino revolutionary leader
- Borbon, Cebu – King Philip V of Borbon)
- Braulio E. Dujali, Davao del Norte – Braulio Española Dujali
- Brooke's Point – James Brooke, British soldier and adventurer
- Bugallon, Pangasinan – Filipino revolutionary José Torres Bugallón
- Burgos, Ilocos Norte – Filipino priest José Burgos
- Burgos, Ilocos Sur – Filipino priest José Burgos
- Burgos, Isabela – Filipino priest José Burgos
- Burgos, La Union – Filipino priest José Burgos
- Burgos, Pangasinan – Filipino priest José Burgos
- Burgos, Surigao del Norte – Filipino priest José Burgos

=== C ===
- Candelaria, Quezon – Our Lady of Candlemas
- Candelaria, Zambales – Our Lady of Candlemas
- Carles, Iloilo – Spanish governor Jose Maria Carles
- Carmen, Agusan del Norte – Our Lady of Mount Carmel
- Carmen, Bohol – Our Lady of Mount Carmel
- Carmen, Cebu – Our Lady of Mount Carmel
- Carmen, Cotabato – Our Lady of Mount Carmel
- Carmen, Davao del Norte – Our Lady of Mount Carmel
- Carmen, Surigao del Sur – Our Lady of Mount Carmel
- Clarin, Bohol – Aniceto Clarin, Governor of Bohol (1901–1904)
- Clarin, Misamis Occidental – José Clarín, Senator (1916–1935) and member of the House of Representatives (1907–1916)
- Claver, Surigao del Norte – Saint Peter Claver
- Claveria, Cagayan – Spanish Governor-General Narciso Clavería y Zaldúa
- Claveria, Masbate – Spanish Governor-General Narciso Clavería y Zaldúa
- Claveria, Misamis Oriental – Spanish Governor-General Narciso Clavería y Zaldúa
- Conner, Apayao – American governor Norman Conner
- Consolacion, Cebu – Our Lady of Consolation
- Corcuera, Romblon – Sebastián Hurtado de Corcuera, Governor-General of the Philippines (1635–1644)
- Cortes, Bohol – Spanish conquistador Hernán Cortés
- Cortes, Surigao del Sur – Spanish conquistador Hernán Cortés
- Cuartero, Capiz – Spanish bishop Mariano Cuartero

=== D ===
- Datu Abdullah Sangki, Maguindanao del Sur – Datu Abdullah Sangki, a prominent local figure
- Datu Anggal Midtimbang, Maguindanao del Sur – Filipino politician Datu Anggal Midtimbang
- Datu Blah T. Sinsuat, Maguindanao del Norte – Filipino politician Datu Blah T. Sinsuat (1908–1981)
- Datu Hoffer Ampatuan, Maguindanao del Sur - former mayor of Datu Piang, Datu Hoffer Ampatuan
- Datu Montawal, Maguindanao del Sur - the Montawal clan
- Datu Odin Sinsuat, Maguindanao del Norte – Filipino politician Datu Odin Sinsuat
- Datu Paglas, Maguindanao del Sur - Datu Ibrahim Paglas
- Datu Piang, Maguindanao del Sur – Moro leader Datu Piang
- Datu Salibo, Maguindanao del Sur - Datu Salibo, prominent figure in the region
- Datu Saudi Ampatuan, Maguindanao del Sur – assassinated local politician Saudi Ampatuan (d. 2002)
- Datu Unsay, Maguindanao del Sur – Filipino politician Andal Ampatuan Jr., nicknamed "Unsay"
- Dagohoy, Bohol – Francisco Dagohoy, Filipino rebel
- Del Carmen, Surigao del Norte – Virgin of Mount Carmel
- Del Gallego, Camarines Sur – Spanish-Filipino businessman Juan del Gallego
- Delfin Albano, Isabela – Delfin Albano, member of the House of Representatives (1957–1965)
- Dolores, Abra – Our Lady of Sorrows
- Dolores, Eastern Samar – Our Lady of Sorrows
- Dolores, Quezon – Our Lady of Sorrows
- Don Carlos, Bukidnon – Filipino politician Carlos Fortich
- Don Marcelino, Davao del Sur – Filipino pioneer Marcelino Maruya
- Don Salvador Benedicto, Negros Occidental – Filipino politician Salvador Benedicto
- Don Victoriano, Misamis Occidental – Filipino-Chinese politician Victoriano Chiongbian
- Doña Remedios Trinidad, Bulacan – Remedios Trinidad-Romualdez, mother of Imelda Marcos

=== E ===
- Echague, Isabela – Spanish Governor-General Rafaél de Echagüe y Bermingham
- Enrile, Cagayan – Pasqual Enrile y Alcedo, Governor-General of the Philippines (1830–1835)
- Enrique B. Magalona, Negros Occidental – Enrique B. Magalona, Senator (1946–1955) and member of the House of Representatives (1931–1946)
- Enrique Villanueva, Siquijor – Filipino politician Enrique C. Villanueva
- Esperanza, Agusan del Sur – Our Lady of Hope
- Esperanza, Masbate – Our Lady of Hope
- Esperanza, Sultan Kudarat – Our Lady of Hope

=== F ===
- Famy, Laguna – President Emilio Aguinaldo y Famy
- Flora, Apayao – wife of Filipino congressman Alfredo Lam-en

=== G ===
- Gabaldon, Nueva Ecija – Senator Isauro Gabaldon
- Gainza, Camarines Sur – Spanish bishop Francisco Gainza
- Gandara, Samar – Spanish Governor-General José de la Gándara y Navarro
- Garchitorena, Camarines Sur – Don Andres Garchitorena, Governor of Ambos Camarines (1919)
- Garcia Hernandez, Bohol – Missionaries Narciso Hernandez de Jesus y Maria and Jose Garcia de la Virgen de los Remedios
- General Emilio Aguinaldo, Cavite – Emilio Aguinaldo, 1st President of the Philippines
- General Luna, Quezon – Antonio Luna, Commanding General of the Philippine Revolutionary Army (1898–1899)
- General Luna, Surigao del Norte – Antonio Luna
- General MacArthur, Eastern Samar – American general Douglas MacArthur
- General Mamerto Natividad, Nueva Ecija – Filipino revolutionary Mamerto Natividad
- General Mariano Alvarez – Mariano Álvarez, Filipino revolutionary and statesman
- General Nakar – Major General Guillermo Nakar, Filipino military officer executed by the Japanese in 1943
- General Salipada K. Pendatun, Maguindanao del Sur – Salipada K. Pendatun, member of the Regular Batasang Pambansa (1984–1985), House of Representatives (1957–1972), Senator (1946–1949), and Governor of Cotabato (1945)
- General Tinio, Nueva Ecija – Manuel Tinio, Governor of Nueva Ecija (1907–1909)
- Gloria, Oriental Mindoro – Gloria Macapagal Arroyo, President of the Philippines (2001–2010)
- Gonzaga, Cagayan – Filipino politician Gracio Gonzaga
- Governor Generoso, Davao Oriental – Filipino politician Sebastian Generoso
- Gregorio del Pilar, Ilocos Sur – Gregorio del Pilar, one of the youngest generals of the Philippine Revolutionary Army

=== H ===
- Hadji Mohammad Ajul, Basilan – first mayor of Tuburan, Basilan
- Hadji Muhtamad, Basilan – father of local politician Wahab Akbar
- Hadji Panglima Tahil, Sulu – local chieftain

=== I ===
- Imelda, Zamboanga Sibugay – Imelda Marcos, former First Lady, Governor of Metro Manila and congresswoman (Leyte–1st and Ilocos Norte–2nd)
- Infanta, Pangasinan – Queen Isabella II of Spain
- Infanta, Quezon – Infanta Isabella Clara Eugenia of Austria
- Isabel, Leyte – Queen Isabella II of Spain
- Isabela, Negros Occidental – Queen Isabella II of Spain

=== J ===
- Javier, Leyte – Filipino teacher and pioneer Daniel Falcon Javier
- Jimenez, Misamis Occidental – Spanish missionary Francisco Jimenez de Fermin
- Jones, Isabela – William Atkinson Jones, member of the United States House of Representatives (1891–1918), namesake of the Jones Act
- Jose Abad Santos, Davao Occidental – José Abad Santos, Chief Justice of the Philippines (1941–1942) and acting President of the Philippines (1942) executed by the Japanese forces
- Jose Dalman, Zamboanga del Norte – Filipino patriot Jose Dalman
- Jose Panganiban, Camarines Norte – José María Panganiban
- Josefina, Zamboanga del Sur – Josefina Edralin, mother of president Ferdinand Marcos
- Jovellar, Albay – Spanish Governor-General and Prime Minister Joaquín Jovellar y Soler
- Julita, Leyte – Filipino pioneer Julita Caladcad

=== K ===
- Kalingalan Caluang, Sulu – Filipino military officer and former governor of Sulu, Sayyid Capt. Kalingalan Caluang

=== L ===
- La Paz, Abra – Our Lady of Peace
- La Paz, Agusan del Sur – Our Lady of Peace
- La Paz, Leyte – Our Lady of Peace
- La Paz, Tarlac – Our Lady of Peace
- Labrador, Pangasinan – Saint Isidore the Laborer
- Lakewood, Zamboanga del Sur – American governor general Leonard Wood
- Lanuza, Surigao del Sur
- Larena, Siquijor – Filipino politician Demetrio Larena
- Las Nieves, Agusan del Norte – Our Lady of the Snows
- Laurel – José P. Laurel, president of the Philippines (1943–1945)
- Lavezares, Northern Samar – Spanish Governor-General Guido de Lavezaris
- Lazi, Siquijor – Spanish Governor-General Manuel Pavía y Lacy.)
- Lemery, Batangas – Spanish Governor-General José Lémery e Ibarrola
- Lemery, Iloilo – Spanish Governor-General José Lémery e Ibarrola
- Leon B. Postigo, Zamboanga del Norte – Filipino general
- Llanera, Nueva Ecija – Filipino revolutionary General Mariano Llanera
- Llorente, Eastern Samar – Filipino politician Julio Llorente
- Lope de Vega, Northern Samar – Spanish playwright and poet Lope de Vega
- Lopez, Quezon – Candido Lopez y Diaz, Spanish governor of Tayabas
- Lopez Jaena – Graciano López Jaena
- Loreto, Agusan del Sur – Nuestra Señora de Loreto
- Loreto, Surigao del Norte – Nuestra Señora de Loreto
- Luisiana, Laguna – Spanish politician Luis Bernardo
- Luna, Apayao – Filipino painter Juan Luna
- Luna, Isabela – Filipino painter Juan Luna
- Luna, La Union – Filipino painter Juan Luna

=== M ===
- Mabini, Batangas – Apolinario Mabini
- Mabini, Bohol – Apolinario Mabini
- Mabini, Davao de Oro – Apolinario Mabini
- Mabini, Pangasinan – Apolinario Mabini
- MacArthur, Leyte – General Douglas MacArthur
- Macrohon, Southern Leyte – Spanish Governor-General Manuel MacCrohon
- Magallanes, Agusan del Norte – Portuguese explorer Ferdinand Magellan
- Magallanes, Cavite – Portuguese explorer Ferdinand Magellan
- Magallanes, Sorsogon – Portuguese explorer Ferdinand Magellan
- Magdalena, Laguna – Mary Magdalene
- Magsaysay, Davao del Sur – Ramon Magsaysay
- Magsaysay, Lanao del Norte – Ramon Magsaysay
- Magsaysay, Misamis Oriental – Ramon Magsaysay
- Magsaysay, Occidental Mindoro – Ramon Magsaysay
- Magsaysay, Palawan – Ramon Magsaysay
- Malvar, Batangas – Miguel Malvar
- Manolo Fortich, Bukidnon – Mayor Manolo Fortich
- Marcos, Ilocos Norte – Mariano Marcos
- Maria, Siquijor – Saint Mary
- Maria Aurora, Aurora – Maria Aurora Quezon, daughter of president Manuel L. Quezon
- Mendez, Cavite – Spanish naval officer Commodore Castro Méndez Núñez
- Mercedes, Camarines Norte – Spanish Princess María de las Mercedes, Princess of Asturias
- Mercedes, Eastern Samar – Spanish Princess María de las Mercedes, Princess of Asturias
- Moises Padilla, Negros Occidental – assassinated Filipino politician
- Monreal, Masbate – Filipino politician Bernardino G. Monreal

=== N ===
- Nabas, Aklan – Spanish Governor General Cárlos María de la Torre y Nava Cerrada
- New Washington, Aklan – George Washington
- Norzagaray – Fernándo Norzagaray y Escudero

=== O ===
- Obando, Bulacan – Spanish Governor-General Francisco José de Ovando
- Ocampo, Camarines Sur – Filipino politician Julian Ocampo

=== P ===
- Padre Burgos, Quezon – José Burgos
- Padre Burgos, Southern Leyte – José Burgos
- Padre Garcia, Batangas – Vicente García, a Filipino priest, hero and defender of Jose P. Rizal
- Pavia, Iloilo – Spanish Governor-General Manuel Pavía y Lacy
- Peñaranda, Nueva Ecija – Spanish engineer José Maria Peñaranda
- Perez, Quezon – Filipino politician Filemón E. Perez
- Pilar, Abra – Our Lady of the Pillar
- Pilar, Bataan – Our Lady of the Pillar
- Pilar, Bohol – Our Lady of the Pillar
- Pilar, Capiz – Our Lady of the Pillar
- Pilar, Cebu – Our Lady of the Pillar
- Pilar, Sorsogon – Our Lady of the Pillar
- Pilar, Surigao del Norte – Our Lady of the Pillar
- Pio Duran, Albay – Filipino politician Pio Saceda Duran
- Pio V. Corpuz, Masbate – Congressman and Governor, Pio Vicente Corpuz
- Plaridel, Bulacan – Filipino patriot Marcelo H. Del Pilar, whose pen name was Plaridel
- Plaridel, Misamis Occidental – Filipino patriot Marcelo H. Del Pilar, whose pen name was Plaridel
- Plaridel, Quezon – Filipino patriot Marcelo H. Del Pilar, whose pen name was Plaridel
- Polanco, Zamboanga del Norte – Spanish missionary Juan Polanco
- Presentacion, Camarines Sur – Filipino politician Teodorico Presentacion
- President Carlos P. Garcia, Bohol – Carlos P. Garcia, President of the Philippines (1957–1961)
- President Quirino, Sultan Kudarat – President Elpidio Quirino
- President Roxas, Capiz – Manuel Roxas, President of the Philippines (1946–1948)
- President Roxas, Cotabato – Manuel Roxas, President of the Philippines (1946–1948)
- Prieto Diaz, Sorsogon – Filipino politicians Gabriel Prieto and Severino Díaz

=== Q ===
- Quezon, Bukidnon – Manuel L. Quezon, President of the Philippines
- Quezon, Isabela – Manuel L. Quezon, President of the Philippines
- Quezon, Nueva Ecija – Manuel L. Quezon, President of the Philippines
- Quezon, Nueva Vizcaya – Manuel L. Quezon, President of the Philippines
- Quezon, Palawan – Manuel L. Quezon, President of the Philippines
- Quezon, Quezon – Manuel L. Quezon, President of the Philippines
- Quirino, Ilocos Sur – President Elpidio Quirino
- Quirino, Isabela – President Elpidio Quirino

=== R ===
- Rajah Buayan, Maguindanao del Sur – Moro leader Rajah Buayan
- Ramon, Isabela – Ramon Magsaysay, President of the Philippines
- Ramon Magsaysay, Zamboanga del Sur – Ramon Magsaysay, President of the Philippines
- Ramos, Tarlac – Filipino politician Alfonso Ramos
- Reina Mercedes, Isabela – Queen Mercedes of Spain
- Remedios T. Romualdez, Agusan del Norte – Remedios Trinidad Romualdez, mother of then First Lady Imelda Marcos
- Rizal, Cagayan – Filipino patriot José Rizal
- Rizal, Kalinga – Filipino patriot José Rizal
- Rizal, Laguna – Filipino patriot José Rizal
- Rizal, Nueva Ecija – Filipino patriot José Rizal
- Rizal, Occidental Mindoro – Filipino patriot José Rizal
- Rizal, Palawan – Filipino patriot José Rizal
- Rizal, Zamboanga del Norte – Filipino patriot José Rizal
- Rodriguez, Rizal – Eulogio Rodriguez
- Rosales, Pangasinan – Spanish member of the Real Audiencia Antonio Rosales
- Rosario, Agusan del Sur – Our Lady of the Rosary
- Rosario, Batangas – Our Lady of the Rosary
- Rosario, Cavite – Our Lady of the Rosary
- Rosario, La Union – Our Lady of the Rosary
- Rosario, Northern Samar – Our Lady of the Rosary
- Roseller Lim, Zamboanga Sibugay – Roseller T. Lim
- Roxas, Isabela – President Manuel Roxas
- Roxas, Oriental Mindoro – President Manuel Roxas
- Roxas, Palawan – President Manuel Roxas

=== S ===
- Saint Bernard, Southern Leyte – Saint Bernard
- Salcedo, Eastern Samar – Juan de Salcedo
- Salcedo, Ilocos Sur – Juan de Salcedo
- Salvador, Lanao del Norte – Filipino politician Salvador T. Lluch
- San Agustin, Isabela – Saint Augustine of Hippo
- San Agustin, Romblon – Saint Augustine of Hippo
- San Agustin, Surigao del Sur – Saint Augustine of Hippo
- San Andres, Catanduanes – Saint Andrew
- San Andres, Quezon – Saint Andrew
- San Andres, Romblon – Saint Andrew
- San Antonio, Northern Samar – Saint Anthony of Padua
- San Antonio, Nueva Ecija – Saint Anthony of Padua
- San Antonio, Quezon – Saint Anthony of Padua
- San Antonio, Zambales – Saint Anthony of Padua
- San Benito, Surigao del Norte – Saint Benedict
- San Clemente, Tarlac – Saint Clement
- San Dionisio, Iloilo – Saint Dionysius
- San Emilio, Ilocos Sur –Saint Emilius
- San Enrique, Iloilo – Saint Henry
- San Enrique, Negros Occidental – Saint Henry
- San Esteban, Ilocos Sur – Saint Stephen
- San Fabian, Pangasinan – Saint Fabian
- San Felipe, Zambales – Saint Philip
- San Fernando, Bukidnon – Saint Ferdinand
- San Fernando, Camarines Sur – Saint Ferdinand
- San Fernando, Cebu – Saint Ferdinand
- San Fernando, Masbate – Saint Ferdinand
- San Fernando, Romblon – Saint Ferdinand
- San Francisco, Agusan del Sur – Saint Francis of Assisi
- San Francisco, Cebu – Saint Francis of Assisi
- San Francisco, Quezon – Saint Francis of Assisi
- San Francisco, Southern Leyte – Saint Francis of Assisi
- San Francisco, Surigao del Norte – Saint Francis of Assisi
- San Guillermo, Isabela – Saint William the Great
- San Ildefonso, Bulacan – Saint Ildephonsus of Toledo
- San Ildefonso, Ilocos Sur – Saint Ildephonsus of Toledo
- San Isidro, Abra – Saint Isidore the Laborer
- San Isidro, Bohol – Saint Isidore the Laborer
- San Isidro, Davao Oriental – Saint Isidore the Laborer
- San Isidro, Isabela – Saint Isidore the Laborer
- San Isidro, Leyte – Saint Isidore the Laborer
- San Isidro, Northern Samar – Saint Isidore the Laborer
- San Isidro, Nueva Ecija – Saint Isidore the Laborer
- San Isidro, Surigao del Norte – Saint Isidore the Laborer
- San Jacinto, Masbate – Saint Hyacinth
- San Jacinto, Pangasinan – Saint Hyacinth
- San Joaquin, Iloilo – Saint Joachim
- San Jorge, Samar – Saint George
- San Jose, Batangas – Saint Joseph
- San Jose, Camarines Sur – Saint Joseph
- San Jose, Dinagat Islands – Saint Joseph
- San Jose, Negros Oriental – Saint Joseph
- San Jose, Northern Samar – Saint Joseph
- San Jose, Occidental Mindoro – Saint Joseph
- San Jose, Romblon – Saint Joseph
- San Jose, Tarlac – Saint Joseph
- San Jose de Buan, Samar – Saint Joseph
- San Jose de Buenavista, Antique – Saint Joseph
- San Juan, Abra – Saint John the Baptist
- San Juan, Batangas – Saint John the Baptist
- San Juan, Ilocos Sur – Saint John the Baptist
- San Juan, La Union – Saint John the Baptist
- San Juan, Siquijor – Saint John the Baptist
- San Juan, Southern Leyte – Saint John the Baptist
- San Julian, Eastern Samar – Saint Julian of Cuenca
- San Leonardo, Nueva Ecija – Saint Leonard of Port Maurice
- San Lorenzo, Guimaras – Saint Lawrence
- San Lorenzo Ruiz, Camarines Norte – Lorenzo Ruiz
- San Luis, Agusan del Sur – Saint Louis of Toulouse
- San Luis, Aurora – Saint Louis of Toulouse
- San Luis, Batangas – Saint Louis of Toulouse
- San Luis, Pampanga – Saint Louis of Toulouse
- San Manuel, Isabela – Saint Emmanuel
- San Manuel, Pangasinan – Saint Emmanuel
- San Manuel, Tarlac – Saint Emmanuel
- San Marcelino, Zambales – Saint Marcellinus or Spanish Governor General Marcelino de Oraá Lecumberri
- San Mariano, Isabela – Saint Marian
- San Mateo, Isabela – Saint Matthew
- San Mateo, Rizal – Saint Matthew
- San Miguel, Surigao del Sur – Saint Michael
- San Miguel, Zamboanga del Sur – Saint Michael
- San Narciso, Quezon – Saint Narcissus
- San Narciso, Zambales – Saint Narcissus
- San Nicolas, Batangas – Saint Nicholas
- San Nicolas, Ilocos Norte – Saint Nicholas
- San Nicolas, Pangasinan – Saint Nicholas
- San Pablo, Isabela – Saint Paul the Apostle
- San Pablo, Zamboanga del Sur – Saint Paul the Apostle
- San Pascual, Batangas – Saint Paschal Baylon
- San Pascual, Masbate – Saint Paschal Baylon
- San Policarpo, Eastern Samar – Saint Polycarp
- San Quintin, Abra – Saint Quentin
- San Quintin, Pangasinan – Saint Quentin
- San Remigio, Antique – Saint Remy
- San Remigio, Cebu – Saint Remy
- San Ricardo, Southern Leyte – Saint Richard
- San Roque, Northern Samar – Saint Roch
- San Sebastian, Samar – Saint Sebastian")
- San Simon, Pampanga – Saint Simon the Apostle
- San Teodoro, Oriental Mindoro – Saint Theodore
- San Vicente, Camarines Norte – Saint Vincent Ferrer
- San Vicente, Ilocos Sur – Saint Vincent Ferrer
- San Vicente, Northern Samar – Saint Vincent Ferrer
- San Vicente, Palawan – Saint Vincent Ferrer
- Sanchez-Mira, Cagayan – Spanish brigadier general Manuel Sanchez Mira
- Santa Ana, Cagayan – Saint Anne
- Santa Ana, Pampanga – Saint Anne
- Santa Barbara, Iloilo – Saint Barbara
- Santa Barbara, Pangasinan – Saint Barbara
- Santa Catalina, Ilocos Sur – Saint Catherine of Alexandria
- Santa Catalina, Negros Oriental – Saint Catherine of Alexandria
- Santa Elena, Camarines Norte – Saint Helena
- Santa Ignacia, Tarlac – Filipino venerable Mother Ignacia del Espíritu Santo
- Santa Josefa, Agusan del Sur – Saint Mary Joseph of the Heart of Jesus
- Santa Lucia, Ilocos Sur – Saint Lucy
- Santa Magdalena, Sorsogon – Saint Mary Magdalene
- Santa Marcela, Apayao – Saint Marcella
- Santa Margarita, Samar – Saint Margaret
- Santa Maria, Bulacan – Saint Mary
- Santa Maria, Davao del Sur – Saint Mary
- Santa Maria, Ilocos Sur – Saint Mary
- Santa Maria, Isabela – Saint Mary
- Santa Maria, Laguna – Saint Mary
- Santa Maria, Pangasinan – Saint Mary
- Santa Maria, Romblon – Saint Mary
- Santa Monica, Surigao del Norte – Saint Monica
- Santa Praxedes, Cagayan – Praxedes
- Santa Rita, Pampanga – Saint Rita of Cascia
- Santa Rita, Samar – Saint Rita of Cascia
- Santa Rosa, Nueva Ecija – Saint Rose of Lima
- Santa Teresita, Batangas – Saint Thérèse of Lisieux
- Santa Teresita, Cagayan – Saint Thérèse of Lisieux
- Santiago, Agusan del Norte – Saint James the Great
- Santiago, Ilocos Sur – Saint James the Great
- Santo Domingo, Albay – Saint Dominic
- Santo Domingo, Ilocos Sur – Saint Dominic
- Santo Domingo, Nueva Ecija – Saint Dominic
- Santo Niño, Cagayan – Holy Child
- Santo Niño, Samar – Holy Child
- Santo Niño, South Cotabato – Holy Child
- Santo Tomas, Davao del Norte – Saint Thomas Aquinas
- Santo Tomas, Isabela – Saint Thomas Aquinas
- Santo Tomas, La Union – Saint Thomas Aquinas
- Santo Tomas, Pampanga – Saint Thomas the Apostle
- Santo Tomas, Pangasinan – Saint Thomas the Apostle
- Senator Ninoy Aquino, Sultan Kudarat – Benigno Aquino Jr.
- Sergio Osmeña Sr., Zamboanga del Norte – President Sergio Osmeña
- Shariff Aguak, Maguindanao del Sur
- Shariff Saydona Mustapha, Maguindanao del Sur – Arab missionary Shariff Saydona Mustapha
- Sikatuna, Bohol – Datu Sikatuna
- Silvino Lobos, Northern Samar – local leader Silvino Lobos
- Sison, Pangasinan – governor Perfecto Sison
- Socorro, Oriental Mindoro – Our Lady of Perpetual Help
- Socorro, Surigao del Norte – Our Lady of Perpetual Help
- Sofronio Española, Palawan – Filipino politician
- Solano, Nueva Vizcaya – Spanish Governor-General Ramón María Solano y Llanderal
- Sultan Dumalondong, Lanao del Sur
- Sultan Kudarat, Maguindanao del Norte – Sultan Muhammad Dipatuan Kudarat
- Sultan Mastura, Maguindanao del Norte
- Sultan Naga Dimaporo, Lanao del Norte – Filipino politician Naga Dimaporo

=== T ===
- Taft, Eastern Samar – US governor-general and president William Howard Taft
- Teresa, Rizal – Doña Teresa Candelaria
- Tobias Fornier, Antique – Congressman Tobias A. Fornier
- Tomas Oppus, Southern Leyte – Filipino politician Tomas G. Oppus
- Trinidad, Bohol – Trinidad de Leon-Roxas, first lady of the Philippines

=== U ===
- Ungkaya Pukan, Basilan
- Urbiztondo, Pangasinan – Spanish Governor-General Juan Antonio de Urbiztondo, Marquis of La Solana

=== V ===
- Valderrama, Antique – Manuel Blanco Valderrama, Spanish Governor-General of the Philippines
- Veruela, Agusan del Sur – Santa María de Veruela
- Victoria, Laguna – Victoria Quirino, daughter of President Elpidio Quirino
- Victoria, Northern Samar – Victoria Quirino
- Victoria, Oriental Mindoro – Victoria Quirino
- Villanueva, Misamis Oriental – Mexican-American military captain
- Villasis, Pangasinan – Spanish Governor-General Rafael Maria Aguilar y Fernandez de Santillan Miño y Villacis
- Villaverde, Nueva Vizcaya – Spanish missionary Juan Villaverde
- Vincenzo A. Sagun, Zamboanga del Sur – Filipino politician
- Vinzons, Camarines Norte – Filipino politician Wenceslao Vinzons

=== Z ===
- Zarraga, Iloilo – Spanish politician Eugenio Pedro Zarraga

== Former names ==
- Shariff Kabunsuan – a defunct province named after Sharif Kabungsuwan, the first Sultan of Maguindanao
- Faire – former name of Santo Niño, Cagayan, named after Ilocano migrant Manuel Faire
- Don Mariano Marcos – former name of Don Victoriano, Misamis Occidental, named after Mariano Marcos
- Don Mariano Marcos – former name of Sominot, Zamboanga del Sur, named after Mariano Marcos
- Doña Alicia – former name of Mabini, Davao de Oro, named after Alicia Syquia Quirino
- Imelda – former name of San Lorenzo Ruiz, Camarines Norte, named after Imelda Marcos
- Imelda – former name of Santa Maria, Romblon, named after Imelda Marcos
- Magsaysay – former name of Delfin Albano, Isabela, named after president Ramon Magsaysay
- Marcos – former name of Rizal, Palawan, named after Ferdinand Marcos
- Mariano Marcos – former name of Lambayong, Sultan Kudarat, named after Mariano Marcos
- President Magsaysay City – former name of Olongapo, named after president Ramon Magsaysay
- Rizal – former name of Basilisa, Dinagat Islands, named after Jose Rizal
- San Isidro – Former name of Sawata, Davao del Norte, named after Saint Isidore the Laborer
- San Mariano – former name of Maragusan, Davao de Oro, named after Saint Marian
- San Vicente – former name of Laak, Davao de Oro, named after Saint Vincent
- Tomas Cabili – former name of Linamon, Lanao del Norte, named after Tomas Cabili

== See also ==
- List of places named after people
