= Golden arinola scandal =

- Type: Political scandal
- Cause: Allegation of President Elpidio Quirino owning an extravagant and expensive arinola (Note: Often translated to mean either a bedpan or a chamber pot) and bed
- First reporter: Armando J. Malay in The Manila Chronicle
- Outcome: Existence of the golden arinola unproven. Bed was found to cost less than alleged. Elpidio Quirino lost his 1953 reelection bid.

Elpidio Quirino, the sixth President of the Philippines from 1948 to 1953, was embroiled in a controversy alleging owned a golden arinola and expensive bed.

The issue was addressed in Senate, with Quirino’s political opponents unsuccessfully using the scandal as grounds for his impeachment. Though unproven, the scandal is considered a factor behind Quirino failing to secure a second term in the 1953 general elections.

== Background ==
Philippine President Elpidio Quirino was alleged to have owned a golden arinola (glossed as chamber pot or bedpan as it was used for urination and often kept under a bed). The arinola reportedly cost around ₱250 (Note: Or ₱29,000 as of 2014) and its complementary bed, ₱5,000.

According to military historian José Custodio, it was Armando J. Malay first reported this alleged arinola in The Manila Chronicle. The extravagant cost of the arinola and bed for 1950s standards raised concerns that government funds were used to purchase the set.

The golden arinola scandal reached the Senate. A hearing on the matter led by Justiniano Montano considered using the scandal as grounds for Quirino's possible impeachment. However, the allegations were eventually dropped.

== Aftermath ==
The purported golden arinola was never found, and the bed’s actual cost was only ₱300. However Quirino’s reputation has taken enough toll to cause him to lose a second term (Note: The 1935 Constitution then in force permitted many officials including the President a four-year term, once renewable, borrowing from the United States model. The present 1987 Constitution allows only a single six-year term.) in the 1953 presidential election to Ramon Magsaysay. He also faced allegations of nepotism and misappropriation of funds besides the golden arinola scandal.

In 2014, one of his granddaughters said his daughter and First Lady Vicky had bought him an arinola from Baclaran, but it was made of stainless steel and not the supposed gold.
