= Alicia Quirino =

Wife of Elpidio Quirino (1903–1945)

Alicia Syquia
- Born: Alicia Jimenez Syquia; October 20, 1903; Binondo, Manila, Commonwealth of the Philippines
- Died: February 9, 1945 (aged 41); Manila, Commonwealth of the Philippines
- Cause of death: Executed during the Battle of Manila
- Resting place: Manila Memorial Park – Sucat
- Spouse: Elpidio Quirino (m. 1921)
- Children: 5, including Victoria Quirino-Gonzalez
- Parent(s): Tomas Angco Syquia; Maria Concepcion Monteclaro Jimenez

Alicia Jimenez Syquia-Quirino (October 20, 1903 – February 9, 1945) was the wife of Elpidio Quirino, the sixth president of the Philippines. A member of the prominent Syquia family of Vigan, she was killed alongside three of her children by Japanese forces during the Battle of Manila in the waning months of World War II. As she did not live to see her husband assume the presidency, her surviving daughter, Victoria Quirino-Gonzalez, fulfilled the role of First Lady of the Philippines.

== Early life and background ==
Alicia Jimenez Syquia was born on October 20, 1903, in Binondo, Manila, to Tomas Angco Syquia and Maria Concepcion Monteclaro Jimenez. She belonged to the affluent Syquia clan, a prominent family of Chinese-Filipino descent that had established deep roots, political influence, and significant wealth in the province of Ilocos Sur, specifically in the heritage city of Vigan.

== Marriage and family ==
Syquia married Elpidio Quirino, a young lawyer and aspiring politician, on January 16, 1921, in Vigan. Upon their marriage, the couple took up residence in the sprawling Syquia Mansion in Vigan, an 1830s colonial bahay-na-bato that served as their primary provincial home.

The couple had five children: Tomas, Armando, Norma, Victoria, and Fe Angela. Throughout their marriage, Alicia supported her husband as his political career rapidly advanced. Before the outbreak of World War II, Elpidio served as a representative, a senator, and a cabinet secretary under the Commonwealth government.

== World War II and death ==
During the Japanese occupation of the Philippines, the Quirino family resided in their home in the Malate district of Manila. In early 1945, as Allied forces entered the capital to liberate it, the civilian population was caught in the devastating urban warfare known as the Battle of Manila. On February 9, 1945, the family was forced to flee their home to escape the intense artillery bombardment and the atrocities being committed by retreating Japanese troops. During their escape, Alicia and three of her children—Armando, Norma, and infant Fe Angela—were intercepted and massacred by Japanese imperial marines. Her husband, Elpidio, and two of their children, Tomas (who was away serving as a soldier) and Victoria, survived the attack.

== Legacy ==
Following the war, Elpidio Quirino continued his public service, becoming Vice President in 1946 and eventually President in 1948 following the sudden death of Manuel Roxas. Deeply affected by the loss of his wife, Quirino never remarried. During his administration, his surviving daughter, Victoria, assumed the social and official duties of the First Lady, making her the youngest to serve in that capacity.

To honor her memory, President Quirino named several newly created municipalities after his late wife:

- Alicia, Isabela: Created on September 28, 1949, through Executive Order No. 268, which separated the town of Old Angadanan and formally renamed it Alicia.
- Alicia, Bohol: Reorganized as an independent municipality in 1950 and renamed in her honor.
- Alicia, Zamboanga Sibugay: A municipality created and named posthumously in her honor on August 22, 1951.
- Doña Alicia, Davao: A municipality created and originally named after her on May 28, 1953. It was renamed Mabini on March 12, 1954. It is now part of Davao de Oro.

Today, the ancestral Syquia Mansion in Vigan operates as a museum showcasing 19th-century colonial architecture and housing the memorabilia of President Quirino and his family. The museum's prominent exhibits include a portrait of Alicia Syquia Quirino painted by National Artist Fernando Amorsolo.

== See also ==
- Elpidio Quirino
- First Lady of the Philippines
- Battle of Manila (1945)
