= Luz Magsaysay =

First Lady of the Philippines from 1953 to 1957

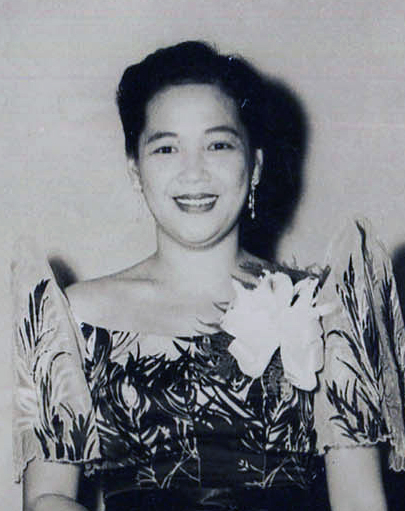

First Lady of the Philippines
- In role December 30, 1953 – March 17, 1957
- President: Ramon Magsaysay
- Preceded by: Victoria Quirino-Gonzalez
- Succeeded by: Leonila Garcia

Personal details
- Born: Luz Rosauro Banzon; July 25, 1914 Balanga, Bataan, Philippine Islands
- Died: August 17, 2004 (aged 90) Quezon City, Philippines
- Resting place: Manila North Cemetery
- Spouse: Ramon Magsaysay (m. 1933; died 1957)
- Children: Teresita (1934–1979); Milagros (b. 1936); Ramon Jr. (b. 1938)

Luz Magsaysay (née Banzon; June 25, 1914 – August 17, 2004) was the wife of Philippine President Ramon Magsaysay and the First Lady of the Philippines from 1953 until her husband's death in 1957.

A native of Balanga, Magsaysay was devoted to her family, relatives and friends. She and Ramon had three children: Teresita (1934–1979), Milagros (b. 1936) and Ramon Jr. (b. 1938).

As the President's consort, Magsaysay was active in many socio-civic programs especially with the Philippine National Red Cross, of which she was honorary Chairwoman for several years. She is remembered as one of the most admired First Ladies and distinguished herself for her warmth and simplicity.

Magsaysay was widowed at 43 years old when President Magsaysay died in an aeroplane crash in 1957, three years and two months into his rule, making it one of the shortest presidential terms in Philippine history. She dedicated herself to the preservation of her husband's memory and led a simple life that was true to her husband's legacy.

== Death and legacy ==
She died in 2004 at the age of 90. In commemoration of her memory, a Barangay in Cebu City, near the Former Airport in Lahug (near the Present Waterfront Hotel and Casino), was named as Barangay Luz in the late 1960s and Barangay Luz Banzon in Jasaan, Misamis Oriental.

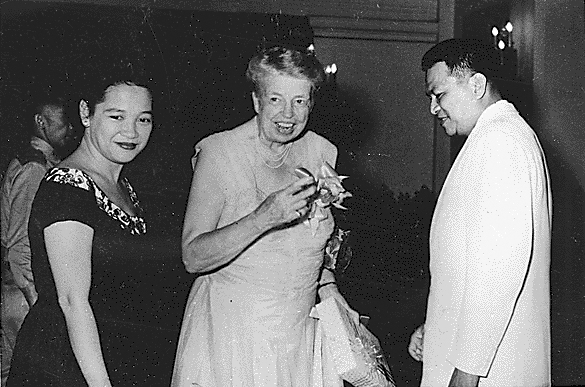
President and Mrs Magsaysay with former American First Lady Eleanor Roosevelt at Malacañang Palace.

Honorary titles
Preceded by Victoria Syquia Quirino	First Lady of the Philippines; 1953–1957	Succeeded by Leonila Garcia
