= Esperanza Osmeña =

First Lady of the Philippines from 1944 to 1946

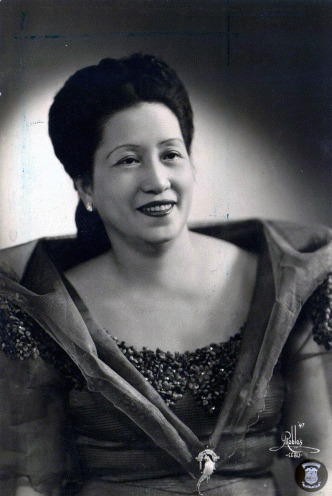

First Lady of the Philippines
- In role 1 August 1944 – 28 May 1946
- President: Sergio Osmeña
- Preceded by: Pacencia Laurel
- Succeeded by: Trinidad Roxas

Personal details
- Born: Esperanza Limjap y Escolar; December 18, 1894 San Miguel, Manila, Captaincy General of the Philippines
- Died: April 4, 1978 (aged 83) Makati, Philippines
- Resting place: Manila North Cemetery
- Spouse: Sergio Osmeña (m. 1920; died 1961)
- Children: 3

Esperanza Escolar Limjap-Osmeña (December 18, 1894 – April 4, 1978) was the second wife of Philippine President Sergio Osmeña and is considered the fourth First Lady of the Philippines.

== Biography ==
Esperanza Limjap y Escolar was born in San Miguel, Manila to Mariano Limjap y Nolasco and María Escolar y Carreón.

She married Osmeña, then the House Speaker and representative from Cebu, on January 10, 1920, in San Miguel, Manila, two years after the death of Osmeña's first wife, Estefania Chiong Veloso. The couple had three children: Ramón, Rosalina, and Victor.

She became first lady upon the death of Manuel L. Quezon, when her husband succeeded to the presidency of the Philippine government-in-exile in the United States. However, while her husband was president-in-exile, she herself was still in the Philippines and remained there, during the Japanese occupation of the Philippines during World War II. On October 30, 1944, Russell W. Volckmann's forces rescued Mrs. Osmeña and family from Baguio.

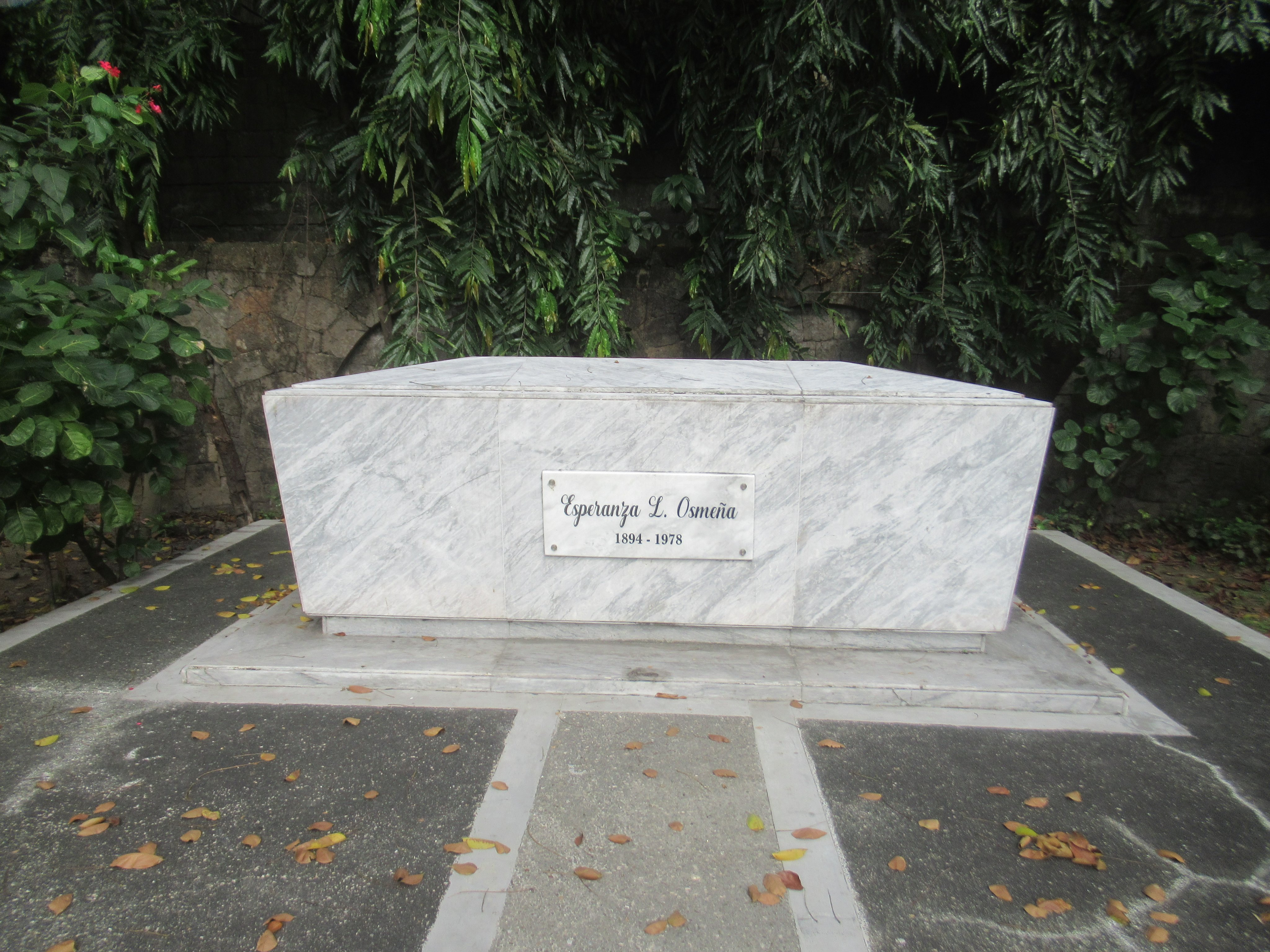
Esperanza Osmeña's tomb at the Manila North Cemetery.

She died on April 4, 1978, in at Makati Medical Center in Makati due to heart failure. She was buried at Manila North Cemetery in Santa Cruz, Manila on April 11, 1978.

== See also ==
- List of American guerrillas in the Philippines

Honorary titles
| Preceded by Pacencia Laurel | First Lady of the Philippines; 1944–1946 | Succeeded by Trinidad Roxas |
