= Saint Emmanuel =

Christian saint (died c. 304)

Saint Emmanuel (died c. 304), was arrested and executed at Sirmium, in what is now Serbia, with 42 other martyrs, including Quadratus (Codratus) and Theodocius, in 304 as part of Diocletian's persecution of the Christians. Their feast day is 26 March.
