= Trinidad Roxas =

Spouse of Philippine President Manuel Roxas (1900–1995)

Trinidad de Leon-Roxas
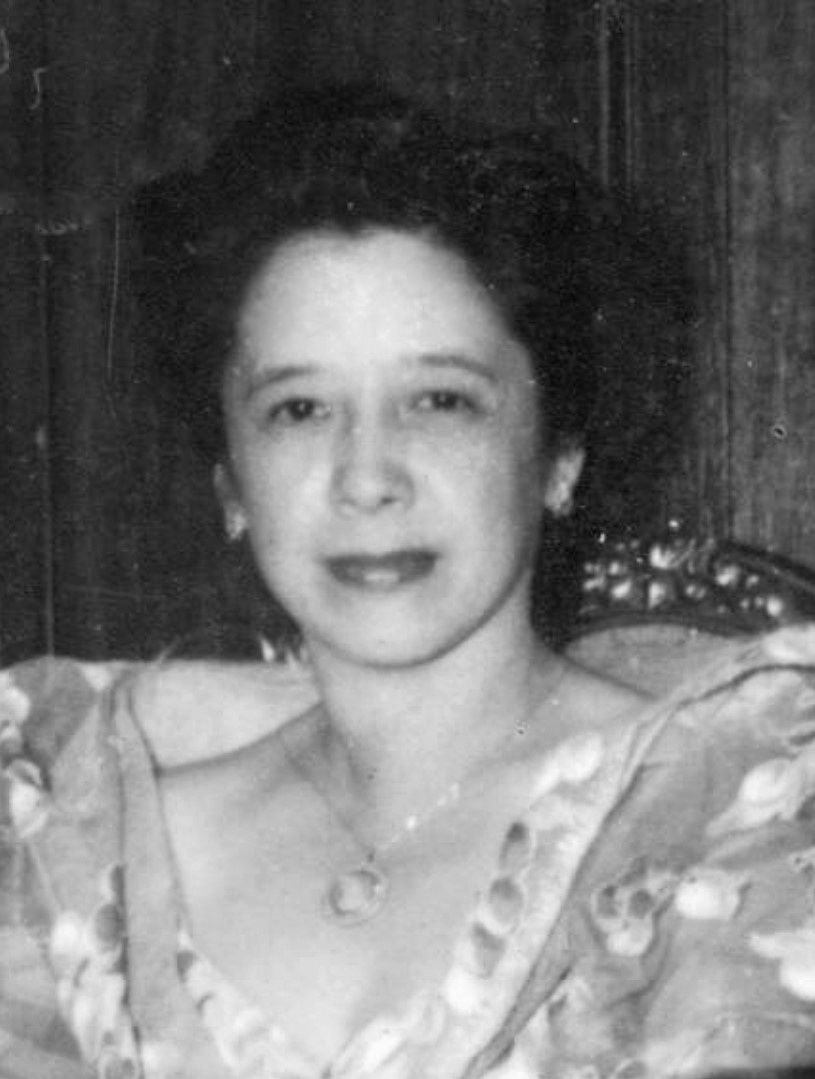
- Official portrait, 1947

First Lady of the Philippines
- In role May 28, 1946 – April 18, 1948
- President: Manuel Roxas
- Preceded by: Esperanza Osmeña
- Succeeded by: Victoria Quirino-Gonzalez

Personal details
- Born: Trinidad Roura de Leon; October 4, 1900 San Miguel, Bulacan, Philippine Islands
- Died: June 20, 1995 (aged 94) Philippines
- Resting place: Manila North Cemetery
- Spouse: Manuel Roxas (m. 1921; died 1948)
- Children: Gerardo Roxas; Ruby Roxas
- Parents: Ceferino de Leon (father); Maria Roura (mother)

Trinidad Roxas (née de Leon; October 4, 1900 – June 20, 1995) was the wife of Philippine President Manuel Roxas and the fifth First Lady of the Philippines. They were married in 1921 and had two children, Ruby and Gerardo (Gerry).

A native of San Miguel, Bulacan, De León-Roxas was the daughter of Ceferino de Leon, who was a member of the Malolos Congress and senator. She was also a beauty pageant contestant, having been crowned Carnival Queen (Queen of the Orient) at the Manila Carnival in 1920.

As the country's first lady during the post-war years, De León-Roxas got involved in various charitable organizations such as the White Cross and the Girl Scouts of the Philippines and restored the annual Malacañang Christmas gift-giving begun prior to World War II. The annual gift-giving has become a tradition to this day.

De León-Roxas died on June 20, 1995.

Honorary titles
Preceded by Esperanza Osmeña	First Lady of the Philippines; 1946–1948	Succeeded by Victoria Syquia Quirino
