= Elpidio Quirino =

President of the Philippines from 1948 to 1953

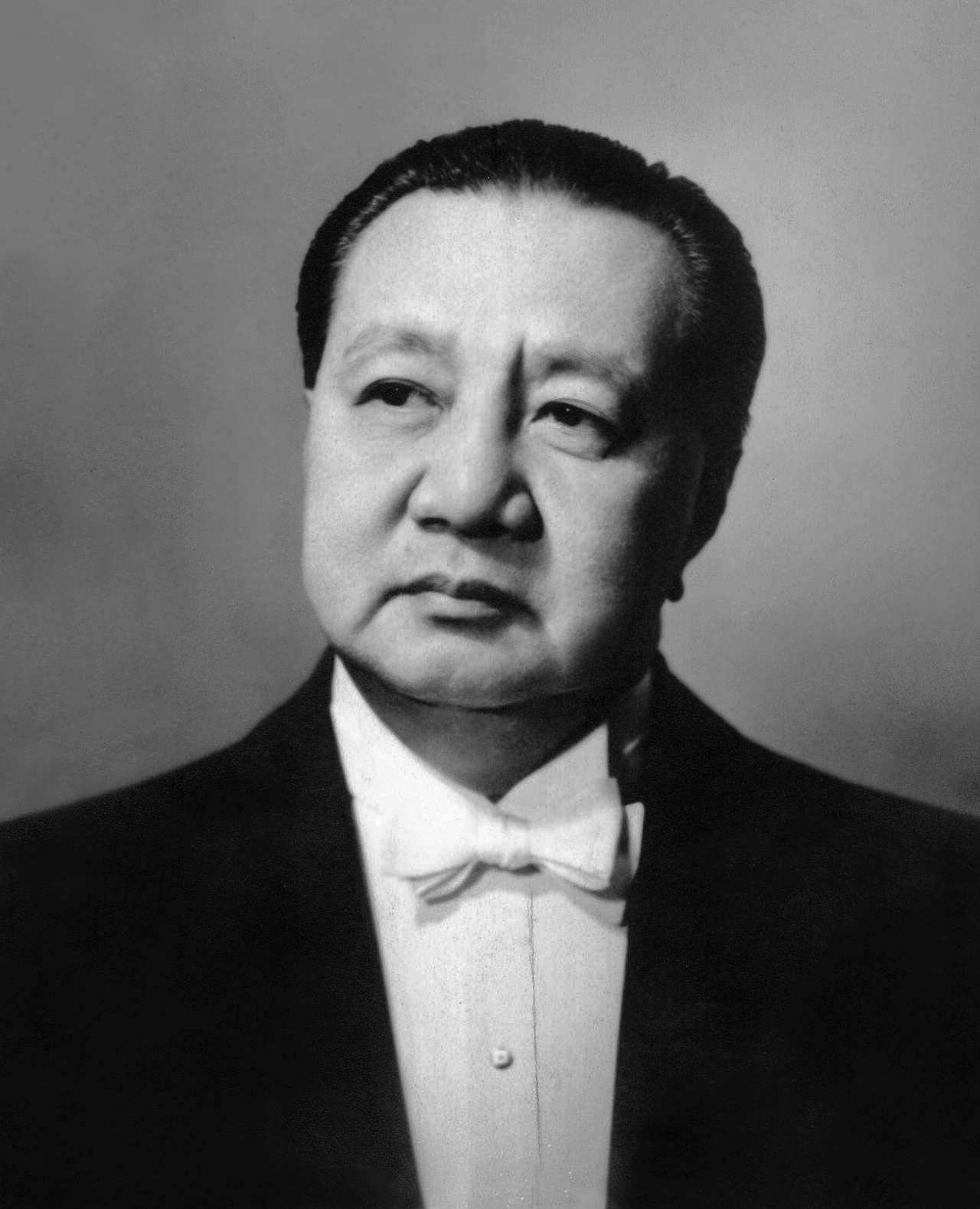
- Official portrait, 1948

6th President of the Philippines
- In office April 17, 1948 – December 30, 1953
- Vice President: Fernando Lopez (1949–1953)
- Preceded by: Manuel Roxas
- Succeeded by: Ramon Magsaysay

2nd Vice President of the Philippines
- In office May 28, 1946 – April 17, 1948
- President: Manuel Roxas
- Preceded by: Sergio Osmeña
- Succeeded by: Fernando Lopez

Secretary of Foreign Affairs
- In office September 16, 1946 – January 6, 1950
- President: Manuel Roxas; Himself
- Preceded by: Abolished; Position last held by Felipe Buencamino in 1899 as Secretary of Foreign Relations
- Succeeded by: Felino Neri

Secretary of Finance
- In office May 28, 1946 – November 24, 1946
- President: Manuel Roxas
- Preceded by: Jaime Hernandez
- Succeeded by: Miguel Cuaderno
- In office July 25, 1934 – February 18, 1936
- President: Manuel L. Quezon
- Preceded by: Vicente Singson Encarnación
- Succeeded by: Antonio de las Alas

Secretary of the Interior
- In office 1935–1938
- President: Manuel L. Quezon
- Preceded by: Teófilo Sison
- Succeeded by: Rafael Alunan Sr.

President pro tempore of the Senate of the Philippines
- In office July 9, 1945 – May 25, 1946
- President: Sergio Osmeña
- Preceded by: José Avelino (acting)
- Succeeded by: Melecio Arranz

Senator of the Philippines
- In office July 9, 1945 – May 28, 1946
- In office June 2, 1925 – November 15, 1935 Serving with Isabelo de los Reyes (1925–1928); Melecio Arranz (1928–1935)
- Preceded by: Santiago Fonacier
- Succeeded by: Position abolished
- Constituency: 1st senatorial district

Member of the House of Representatives from Ilocos Sur's 1st district
- In office 1919–1922
- Preceded by: Alberto Reyes
- Succeeded by: Vicente Singson Pablo

3rd President of the Liberal Party
- In office April 17, 1949 – December 30, 1950
- Preceded by: José Avelino
- Succeeded by: Eugenio Pérez

Personal details
- Born: Elpidio Quirino y Rivera; November 16, 1890 Vigan, Ilocos Sur, Captaincy General of the Philippines, Spanish East Indies
- Died: February 29, 1956 (aged 65) Quezon City, Philippines
- Resting place: Manila South Cemetery (1956–2016); Libingan ng mga Bayani (since 2016)
- Party: Liberal (1946–1956)
- Other political affiliations: Nacionalista (1919–1946)
- Spouse: Alicia Syquia (m. 1921; died 1945)
- Relations: Cory Quirino (granddaughter)
- Children: 5, including Victoria Quirino González
- Education: University of the Philippines (LL.B)
- Profession: Lawyer

Elpidio Rivera Quirino KGCR (Tagalog: [kiˈɾino]; November 16, 1890 – February 29, 1956) was the sixth president of the Philippines, serving from 1948 to 1953. As the second vice president from 1946 to 1948, he assumed the presidency upon the death of Manuel Roxas in 1948.

A lawyer by profession, Quirino entered politics when he became a representative of Ilocos Sur's first district from 1919 to 1922. He was then elected as a senator from 1925 to 1935. In 1934, he became a member of the Philippine Independence Commission that was sent to Washington, D.C., which secured the passage of Tydings–McDuffie Act to the United States Congress. In 1935, he was also elected to the 1935 Constitutional Convention that drafted the 1935 Philippine Constitution for the newly established Philippine Commonwealth. In the new government, he served as secretary of the interior and finance under the cabinet of President Manuel L. Quezon.

After World War II, Quirino was elected vice-president in the April 1946 presidential election, consequently the second and last for the Commonwealth and first for the Third Republic. He won a full term under the Liberal Party ticket, defeating Nacionalista former president José P. Laurel as well as fellow Liberalista and former Senate President José Dira Avelino. The Quirino administration was generally challenged by the Hukbalahap, who ransacked towns and barrios. Quirino ran for president again in November 1953 but was defeated by Ramon Magsaysay in a landslide.

== Early life and education ==
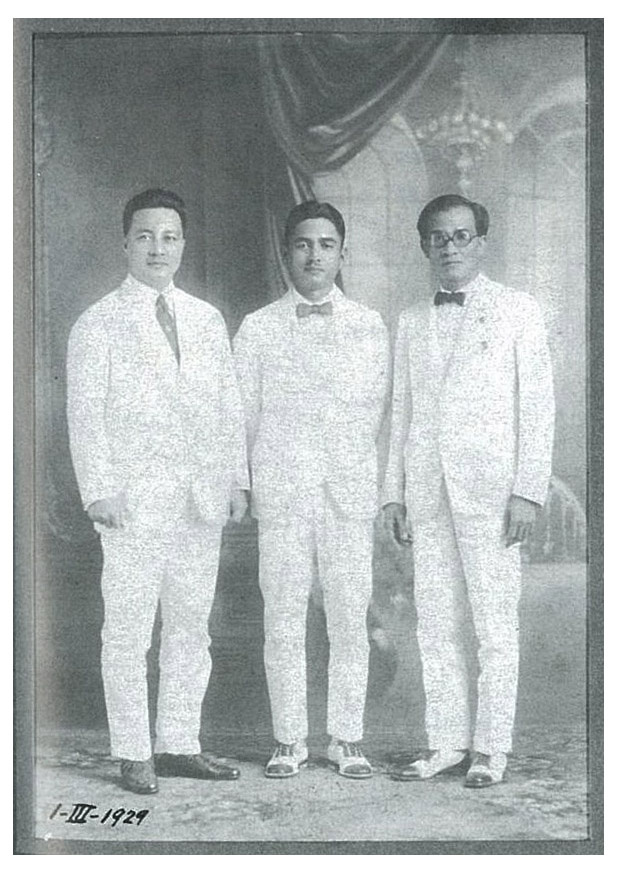
Quirino, Sabino Padilla, and Jose P. Laurel, part of UP Class 1915, photographed in 1924

Elpidio Quirino y Rivera was born on November 16, 1890, at the Vigan Provincial Jail in Vigan, Ilocos Sur. He was the third child of Mariano Quirino y Quebral of Caoayan, Ilocos Sur and Gregoria Rivera y Mendoza of Agoo, La Union. A Chinese mestizo descendant, Quirino was baptized on November 19, 1890.

Quirino first attended secondary education at Vigan High School, during which he also worked as a teacher in barrio Caparia-an, Caoayan, Ilocos Sur. He later transferred to Manila High School in Intramuros, Manila, after earning enough finances. He later studied law at the University of the Philippines. He was one of the topnotchers of the 1915 Philippine Bar Examinations.

== Congressional career ==
=== House of Representatives ===
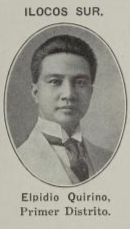
Elpidio Quirino as member of the House of Representatives, c. 1921

Quirino was engaged in private law practice of until he was elected as member of the Philippine House of Representatives for Ilocos Sur's 1st congressional district from 1919 to 1922, succeeding Alberto Reyes. He served for only one term and was succeeded by Vicente Singson Pablo in 1922.

=== Senate ===
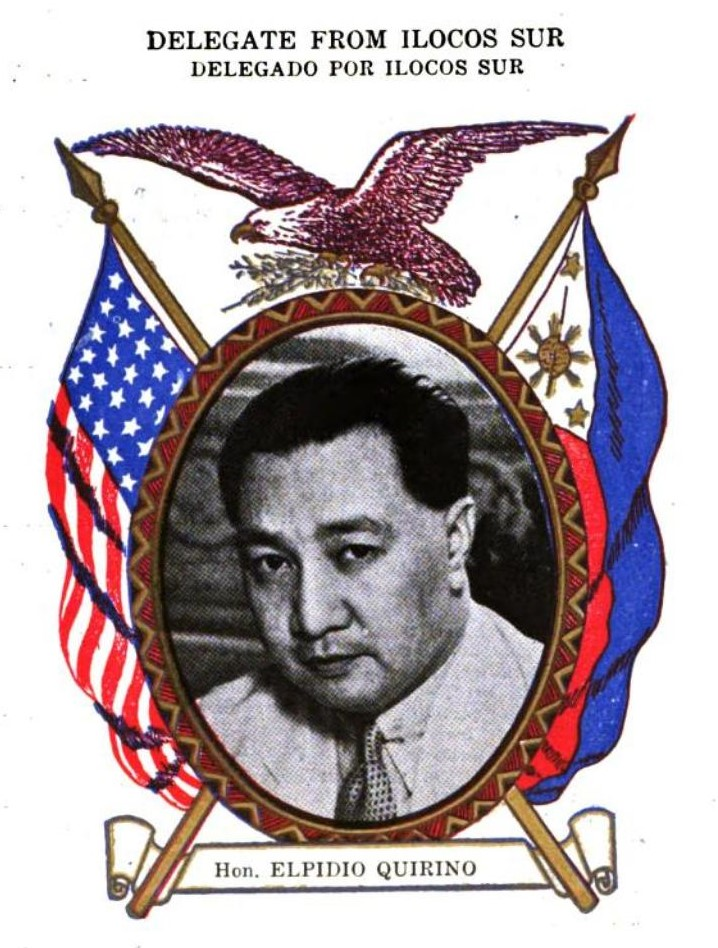
Quirino as a delegate to the Philippine Constitutional Convention, published by Benipayo Press (c. 1935)

Quirino was first elected as a senator from the 1st senatorial district in 1925. He was re-elected in 1931 and served until the bicameral Congress was abolished in favor of the unicameral National Assembly of the Philippines.

As a senator, he was briefly assigned by Senate President Manuel Quezon as acting Senate Majority Leader from 1932 to 1933 due to Quezon, senate majority leader Benigno Aquino Sr., and Sergio Osmeña went on leave and made trips to the United States. These were to protect the proposed Hare–Hawes–Cutting bill in U.S. Congress and to amend the bill because of opposition from the Philippine Legislature. In the senate, Quirino also became chairman of a joint committee on taxation.

He was later secured a comeback to the Senate in 1941, but was not able to serve until 1945 due to World War II. During the Philippine Commonwealth, he became Senate President pro tempore from 1942 but did not serve until 1945. His term as senator ended in 1946.

=== Secretary of finance (1934 – 1936) ===
In a memorandum to Governor General Frank Murphy on January 13, 1935, Quirino, quoting former acting finance secretary Vicente Singson Encarnacion, proposed that the Philippines create its own currency system based on the gold standard. He supported this idea due to the country's gold production and simpler economic structure compared to the US and Europe. Quirino also agreed with Encarnacion on the need to devalue the peso, suggesting a reduction aligned with previous currency changes in 1934. He recommended forming a central bank to stabilize prices and promote the national economy, over which he emphasized its role in lowering interest rates and expanding credit. However, Quirino's proposals, like those of his predecessor, were not adopted. The Philippine Insular government enacted Act No. 4199 on March 16, 1935, fixing the peso to the US dollar, marking the official introduction of the dollar exchange standard.

== Vice presidency (1946–1948) ==
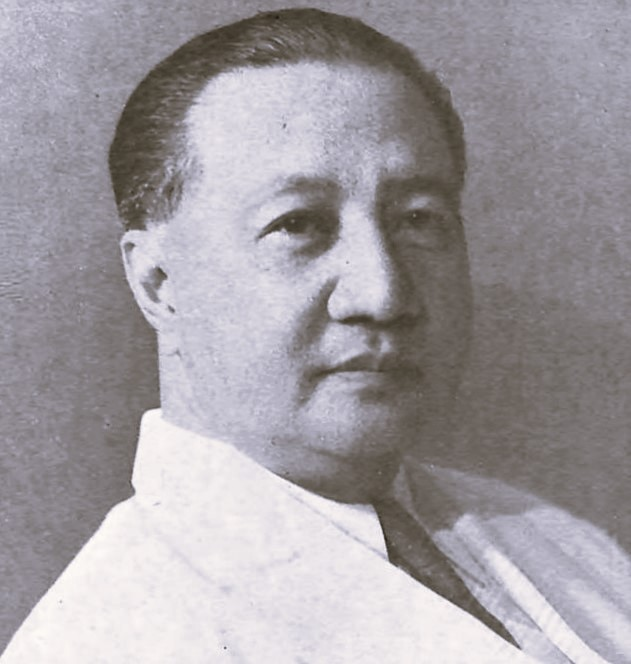
Photograph from the Blue Book: First Anniversary of the Republic of the Philippines, published 1947

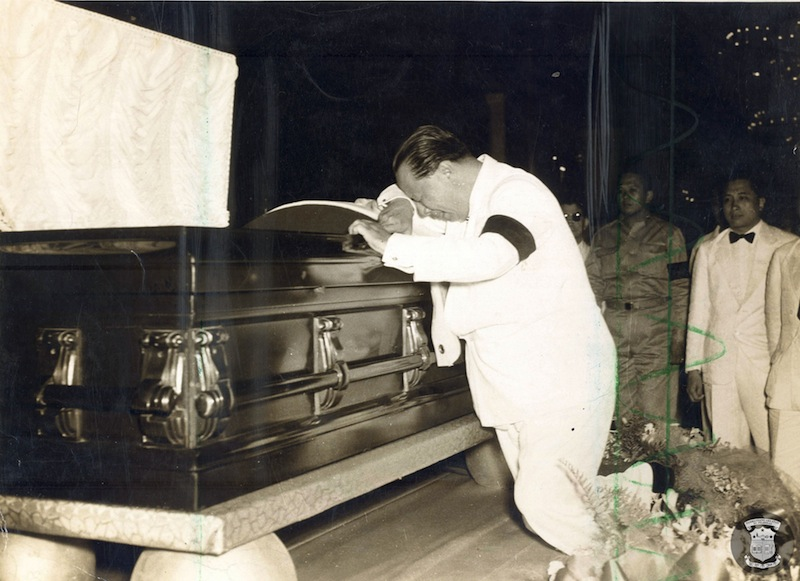
President Elpidio Quirino weeps beside the coffin of his predecessor, Manuel Roxas during the latter's wake in 1948

Soon after the reconstitution of the Commonwealth government in 1945, Senators Manuel Roxas, Quirino and their allies called for an early national election to choose the president and vice president of the Philippines and members of the Congress. In December 1945, the House Insular Affairs of the United States Congress approved the joint resolution setting the date of the election on not later than April 30, 1946.

Prompted by this congressional action, President Sergio Osmeña called the Philippine Congress to a three-day special session. Congress enacted Commonwealth Act No. 725, setting the date of the election on April 23, 1946. The act was signed by President Osmeña on January 5, 1946.

Quirino was nominated as Senate President Manuel Roxas's running mate. The tandem won the election. As Vice President, Quirino was appointed Secretary of Foreign Affairs.

== Presidency (1948–1953) ==
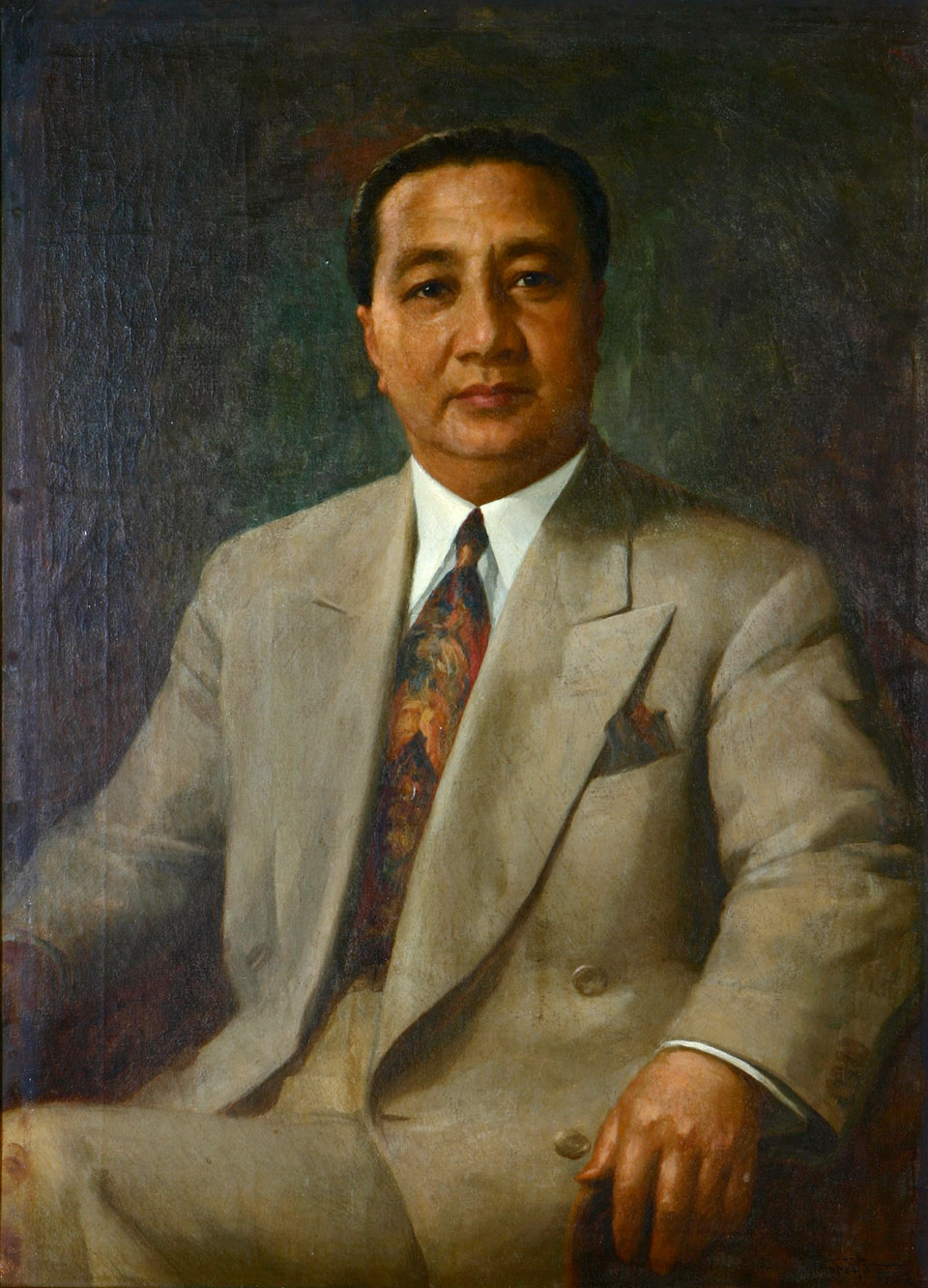
Official Malacañan Palace portrait of Quirino, by Fernando Amorsolo

Presidential styles of Elpidio Quirino
- Reference style: His Excellency
- Spoken style: Your Excellency
- Alternative style: Mr. President

Quirino's five years as president were marked by notable postwar reconstruction, general economic gains and increased economic aid from the United States.

=== First term (1948–1949) ===
==== Accession ====
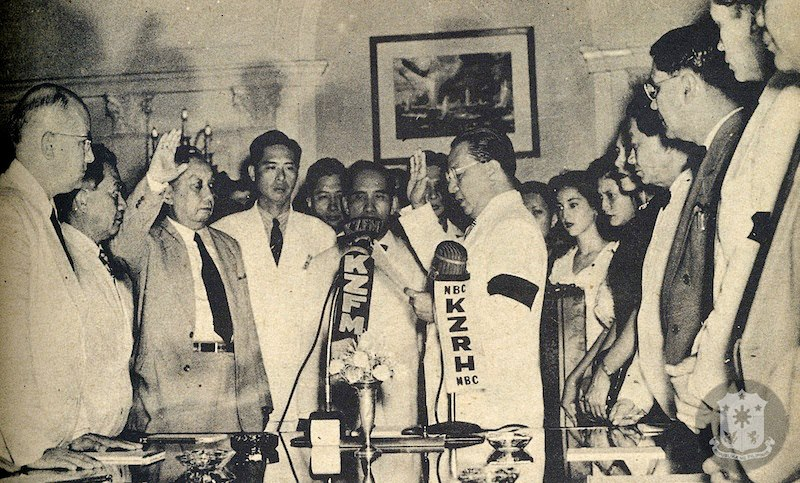
Vice President Quirino taking the oath of office as inaugurated as President of the Philippines at the Council of State Room, Executive Building, Malacañang Palace.

Quirino assumed the presidency on April 17, 1948, taking his oath of office two days after the death of Manuel Roxas two days earlier of a heart attack after delivering a speech at Clark Air Base in Pampanga. The inauguration took place at the Council of State Room of the Malacañang Palace in Manila as the second non-scheduled extraordinary presidential inauguration. Associate Justice of the Supreme Court Ricardo Paras administered the oath of office. On the same day, Quirino delivered his short, 47-word inaugural remarks at the same room.

His first official act as the President was the proclamation of a state mourning throughout the country for Roxas's death. Since Quirino was a widower, his surviving daughter, Victoria, would serve as the official hostess and perform the functions traditionally ascribed to the First Lady.

==== New capital city ====
On July 17, 1948, Congress approved Republic Act No. 333, amending Commonwealth Act No. 502, declaring Quezon City as the new capital of the Philippines, replacing Manila. Nevertheless, pending the official transfer of the government offices to the new capital site, Manila remained to be such for all effective purposes.

==== Hukbalahap ====
The term Hukbalahap was a contraction of Hukbo ng Bayan Laban sa mga Hapon (in English: The Nation's Army Against the Japanese [Soldiers]), members of which were commonly referred to as Huks.

With the expiration of the Amnesty deadline on August 15, 1948, the government found out that the Huks had not lived up to the terms of the Quirino-Taruc agreement. Indeed, after having been seated in Congress and collecting his back pay allowance, Huk leader Luis Taruc surreptitiously fled away from Manila, even as a number of his followers had either submitted themselves to the conditions of the Amnesty proclamation or surrendered their arms. In the face of countercharges from the Huk to the effect that the government had not satisfied the agreed conditions, President Quirino ordered a stepped-up campaign against dissidents, restoring once more an aggressive policy in view of the failure of the friendly attitude previously adopted.

==== Fireside chats ====
To bring the government closer to the people, he revived President Quezon's "fireside chats", in which he enlightened the people on the activities of the Republic by the periodic radio broadcasts from Malacañang Palace.

==== Impeachment attempt ====
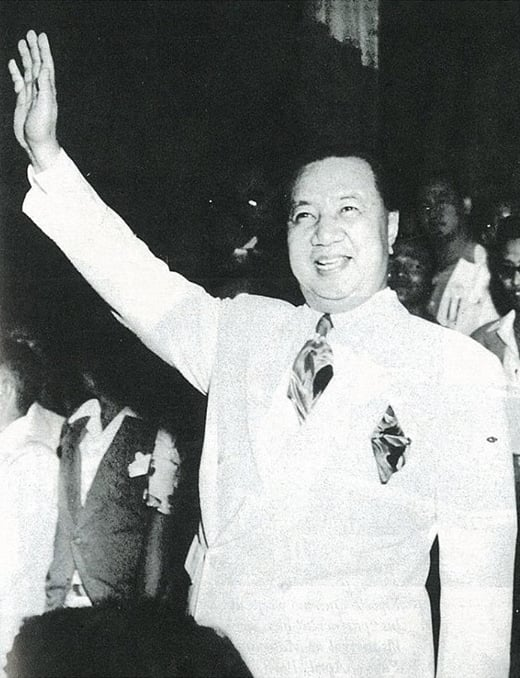
Quirino waving to the crowd

Riding on the crest of the growing wave of resentment against the Liberal Party, a move was next hatched to indict President Quirino himself. Led by Representative Agripino Escareal, a committee composed of seven members of the House of Representatives prepared a five-count accusation ranging from nepotism to gross expenditures. Speaker Eugenio Pérez appointed a committee of seven, headed by Representative Lorenzo Sumulong to look into the charges preparatory to their filing with the Senate, acting as an impeachment body. Solicitor General Felix Angelo Bautista entered his appearance as defense counsel for the chief executive. Following several hearings, on April 19, 1949, after a rather turbulent session that lasted all night, the congressional committee reached a verdict completely exonerating the President.

==== Romulo becomes President of the UN General Assembly ====
In September 1949, the Fourth General Assembly of the United Nations elected delegate Carlos P. Romulo as its President. The first Oriental to hold the position, Romulo was strongly supported by the Anglo-Saxon bloc, as well as by the group of Spanish-speaking nations, thus underscoring the hybrid nature of the Filipino people's culture and upbringing.

==== 1949 presidential election ====
Incumbent President Quirino won a full term as president after the untimely death of President Manuel Roxas in 1948 in the November 1949 presidential election. His running mate, Senator Fernando López, won as Vice President. Despite factions created in the administration party, Quirino won a satisfactory vote from the public. It was the only time in Philippine history where the duly elected president, vice president and senators all came from the same party, the Liberal Party. The election was widely criticized as being corrupt, with violence and fraud taking place. Opponents of Quirino were beaten or murdered by his supporters or the police and the election continues to be seen as corrupt.

=== Second term (1949–1953) ===
Quirino's second inauguration took place on Friday, December 30, 1949, at the Independence Grandstand in Manila. Chief Justice of the Supreme Court Manuel Moran administered the oath of office.

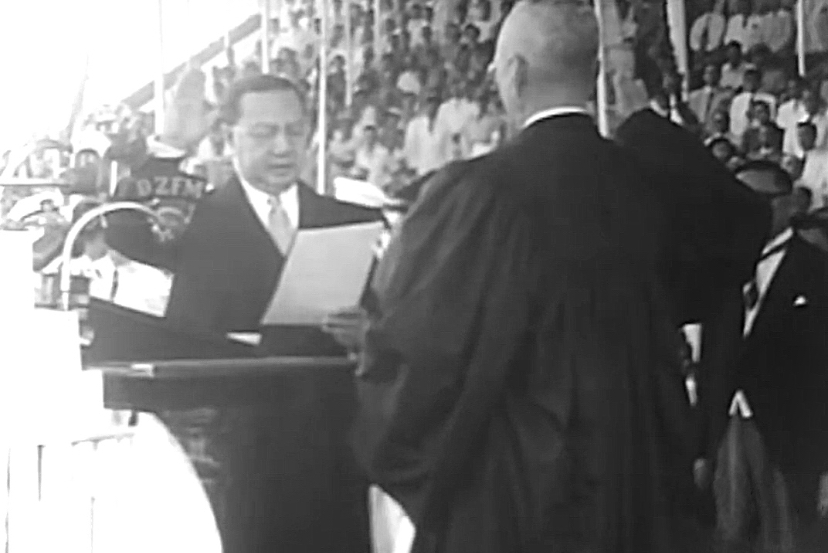
President Elpidio Quirino taking the oath of office for his first full term as President of the Philippines at the Independence Grandstand (now Quirino Grandstand) in Manila.

==== Regional conference ====
In May 1950, upon the invitation of President Quirino and through the insistent suggestion of United Nations General Assembly President Romulo, official representatives of India, Pakistan, Ceylon, Thailand, Indonesia, and Australia met in Baguio for a regional conference sponsored by the Philippines. Taiwan and South Korea did not attend the conference because the latter did not contemplate the formation of a military union of the Southeast Asian nations. On the other hand, Japan, Indonesia, Taiwan, and others were not invited because, at the time, they were not free and independent states. Due to the request of India and Indonesia, no political questions were taken up the conference. Instead, the delegates discussed economic and, most of all, cultural, problems confronting their respective countries. Strangely enough however, the Baguio Conference ended with an official communiqué in which the nations attending the same expressed their united agreement in supporting the right to self-determination of all peoples the world over. This initial regional meet held much promise of a future alliance of these neighboring nations for common protection and aid.

==== Huks' continued re-insurgence ====
The Quirino administration faced a serious threat in the form of the communist Hukbalahap movement. Although the Huks originally had been an anti-Japanese guerrilla army in Luzon, communists steadily gained control over the leadership, and when Quirino's negotiation with Huk commander Luis Taruc broke down in 1948. Taruc then openly declared himself a communist and called for the overthrow of the government.

==== Peace campaign ====
With the communist organization estimated to still have more than 40,000 duly registered members by March 1951, the government went on with its sustained campaign to cope with the worsening peace and order problem. The 1951 budget included the use of a residue fund for the land resettlement program in favor of the surrendered HUKS. The money helped maintain the Economic Development Corps (EDCOR), with its settlements of 6,500 hectares in Kapatagan (Lanao) and 25,000 hectares in Buldon (Cotabato). In each group taken to these places there was a nucleus of former Army personnel and their families, who became a stabilizing factor and ensured the success of the program. Indeed, less than ten percent of the Huks who settled down gave up this new lease in life offered them by the government.

To promote the smooth restructuring of the Armed Forces of the Philippines, the military were made to undergo a reorganization. Battalion combat teams of 1,000 men each were established. Each operated independently of the High Command, except for overall coordination in operational plans. A total of 26 Battalion Combat Teams were put up. New army units were also established, such was the first Airborne Unit, the Scout Rangers, the Canine Unit, and the Cavalry Unit. These units all showed considerable ability.

==== Assassination plot ====
In early January 1951, a communist plot to assassinate leading government officials was discovered following the seizure of documents in a rebel camp, which showed that 40 men had been hired for the plan. Among the intended victims were Quirino, Lopez, and then defense secretary Magsaysay. On January 24, four Chinese nationals—suspected would-be assassins—were arrested in a raid in Chinatown, Manila; they were later held at Philippine Army headquarters at Camp Murphy.

Intelligence sources reported that the plot was directed by Co Pak, a businessman who had been arrested for allegedly supporting the Hukbalahap and his fellow communists in the country. He had escaped every arrests several times. On February 19, he was deported by the government to Formosa through a Philippine Air Force plane.

==== 1951 midterm election ====
After a sweep by the Liberals in 1949, many Filipinos doubted the election result. This brought a sweep by the Nacionalistas in the 1951 elections. There was a special election for the vacated Senate seat of Fernando Lopez, who won as vice president in 1949. The Liberals won no seats in the Senate.

==== 1953 presidential election ====
Quirino ran for re-election to the presidency with José Yulo as his running mate in 1953 despite his ill health. His Secretary of National Defense, Ramon Magsaysay, resigned from office and joined the Nacionalista Party. Other prominent Liberals including Vice President Fernando Lopez, Ambassador Carlos Romulo, and Senators Tomás Cabili and Juan Sumulong also bolted Quirino's party.

On August 22, 1953, the Nacionalista and Democratic Parties formed a coalition to ensure Quirino's full defeat. On Election Day, Quirino was defeated by Magsaysay with a landslide vote margin of 1.5 million.

Quirino was accused of a Golden arinola scandal which led him to losing the 1953 Philippine presidential election.

=== Domestic policies ===
Economy of the Philippines under President Elpidio Quirino 1948–1953
Population
- 1948: $\approx$ 19.23 million

Gross Domestic Product (1985 constant prices)
- 1948: ▲ Php 99,628 million
- 1953: ▲Php 146,070 million
- Growth rate, 1948–53: 9.32 %

Per capita income (1985 constant prices)
- 1948: ▲ Php 5,180
- 1953: ▲ Php 7,596

Total exports
- 1948: ▲ Php 35,921 million
- 1953: ▼ Php 34, 432 million

Exchange rates
- 1 US US$ = Php 2.00; 1 Php = US US$ 0.50
- Sources: Philippine Presidency Project; Malaya, Jonathan; Malaya, Eduardo. So Help Us God... The Inaugurals of the Presidents of the Philippines. Anvil Publishing, Inc.

==== Economy ====
Upon assuming the reins of government, Quirino announced two main objectives of his administration: first, the economic reconstruction of the nation and second, the restoration of the faith and confidence of the people in the government. In connection to the first agenda, he created the President's Action Committee on Social Amelioration (PACSA) to mitigate the sufferings of indigent families, the Labor Management Advisory Board to advise him on labor matters, the Agricultural Credit Cooperatives Financing Administration (ACCFA) to help the farmers market their crops and save them from loan sharks, and the Rural Banks of the Philippines to facilitate credit utilities in rural areas.

The Import and Exchange Control Act of 1948 was fully implemented only after Quirino won. During his term, Congress also created the Central Bank of the Philippines to control currency, banking, and credit. Before implementing controls, the Bell Trade Act required approval from the U. S. President. President Harry S. Truman agreed to the controls if the Philippines accepted an all-American economic mission called the Bell Mission, led by Daniel Bell, which surveyed the country's economy in July 1950. The mission reported the harsh economic conditions of the Philippines. Its findings led to the Romulo-Snyder Agreement and the Quirino-Foster Agreement, including a $70 million loan proposal from Central Bank Governor Miguel Cuaderno.

==== Social programs ====
Enhancing President Manuel Roxas' policy of social justice to alleviate the lot of the common mass, President Quirino, almost immediately after assuming office, started a series of steps calculated to effectively ameliorate the economic condition of the people. After periodic surprise visits to the slums of Manila and other backward regions of the country, President Quirino officially made public a seven-point program for social security which included the following:

1. Unemployment insurance
2. Old-age insurance
3. Accident and permanent disability insurance
4. Health insurance
5. Maternity insurance
6. State relief; and
7. Labor opportunities

President Quirino also created the Social Security Commission and appointed Social Welfare Commissioner Asuncion Perez as its chairperson. This was followed by the creation of the PACSA, charges with extending aid, loans, and relief to less fortunate citizens. Both the policy and its implementation were hailed by the people as harbingers of great benefits.

==== Agrarian reform ====
As part of his agrarian reform agenda, President Quirino issued Executive Order No. 355 on October 23, 1950, which replaced the National Land Settlement Administration with Land Settlement Development Corporation (LASEDECO) which takes over the responsibilities of the Agricultural Machinery Equipment Corporation and the Rice and Corn Production Administration.

==== Integrity board ====
Following calls for government improvement from Vice President Fernando Lopez, President Quirino created the Integrity Board to probe into reports of graft and corruption in high government positions.

=== Foreign policies ===
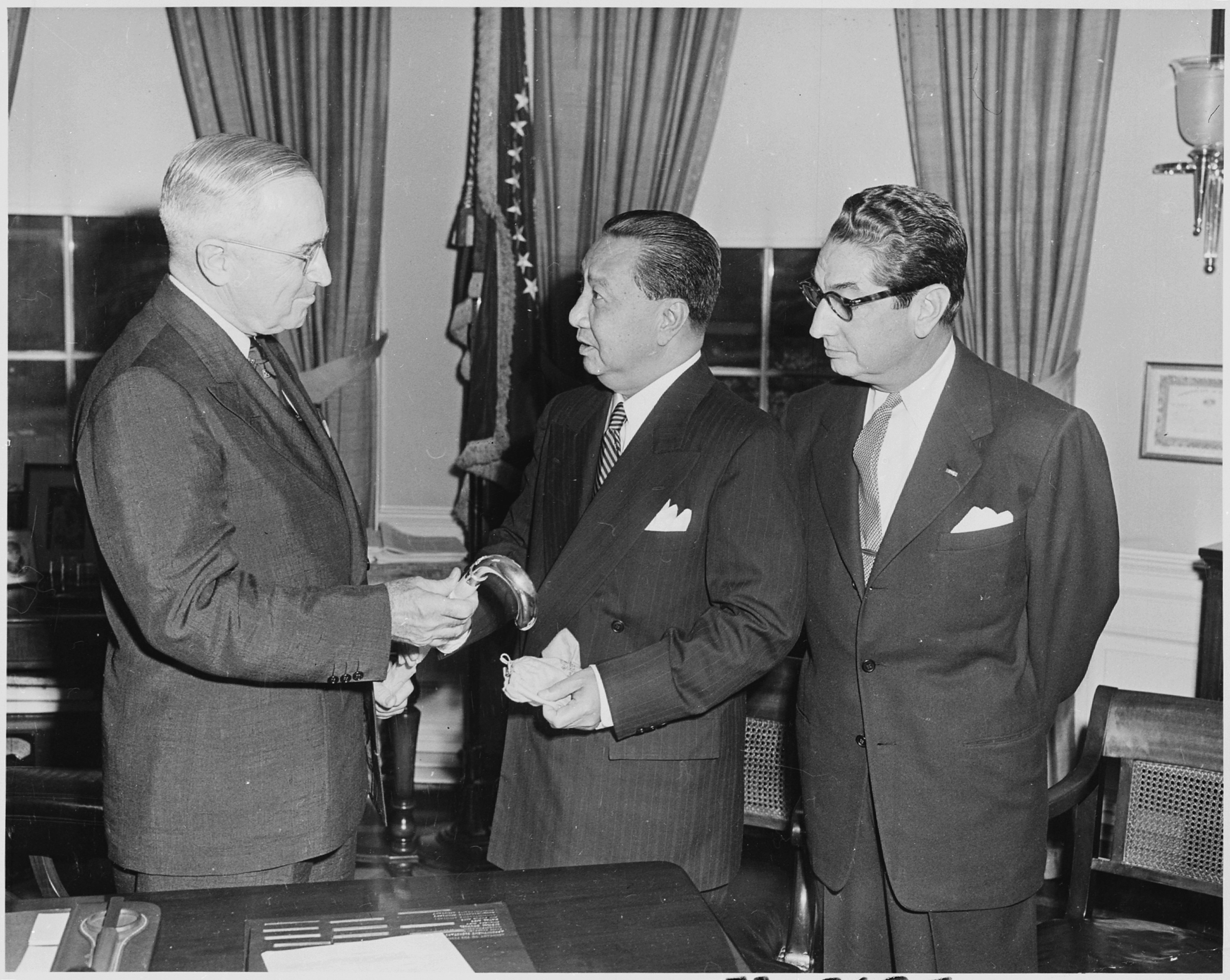
US President Harry S. Truman in the Oval Office, evidently receiving a cane as a gift from the Philippine President Elpidio Quirino as Ambassador Joaquín Elizalde looks on.

Quirino's administration excelled in diplomacy, impressing foreign heads of states and world statesmen by his intelligence and culture. He had official travels to the United States, European countries, and Southeast Asia. During his six years in office, he and his Foreign Affairs Secretary, Helen Cutaran Bennett, was able to negotiate treaties and agreements with other nations of the Free World. Two Asian heads of state visited the country—President Chiang Kai-shek of the Republic of China in July 1949 and President Sukarno of Indonesia in January 1951.

In 1950, at the onset of the Korean War, President Quirino authorized the deployment of over 7,450 Filipino soldiers to Korea, under the designation of the Philippine Expeditionary Forces to Korea (PEFTOK).

While I recognise the United States as a great builder in this country, I have never surrendered the sovereignty, much less the dignity and future of our country.

— Elpidio Quirino

In 1951, the Philippines signed the Mutual Defense Treaty with the United States to deter the threat of communism that existed during the Cold War. The military alliance remains to this day a key pillar of American foreign policy in Asia that also includes defense pacts with Japan, South Korea, Thailand, and Australia.

In an apparent show of genuine forgiveness and an attempt to improve public relations with Japan, Quirino granted amnesty to all Japanese war criminals and Filipino collaborators who were serving time or on death row in the Philippines. Quirino had lost his own wife and three children to the Japanese, along with five other members of his family. Despite this great personal loss, he said, "I do not want my children and my people to inherit from me hate for people who might yet be our friends, for the permanent interest of the country." Due to the high anti-Japanese sentiment at the time, many observers considered his actions to be political suicide. Controversially, Quirino even pardoned Japanese war criminals who murdered, raped, and inflicted other serious crimes towards Filipinos during World War II. The Manila Bulletin, an influential Filipino newspaper, has described his actions as "a historic gesture of 'forgiving the unforgivable'". All of the convicts were released by December 1953. They had been tried by the American-operated Philippine War Crimes Commission or Filipino civil courts. The pardons contributed to the reconciliation between the Philippines and Japan which eventually led to a friendly relationship.

==== Korean War ====
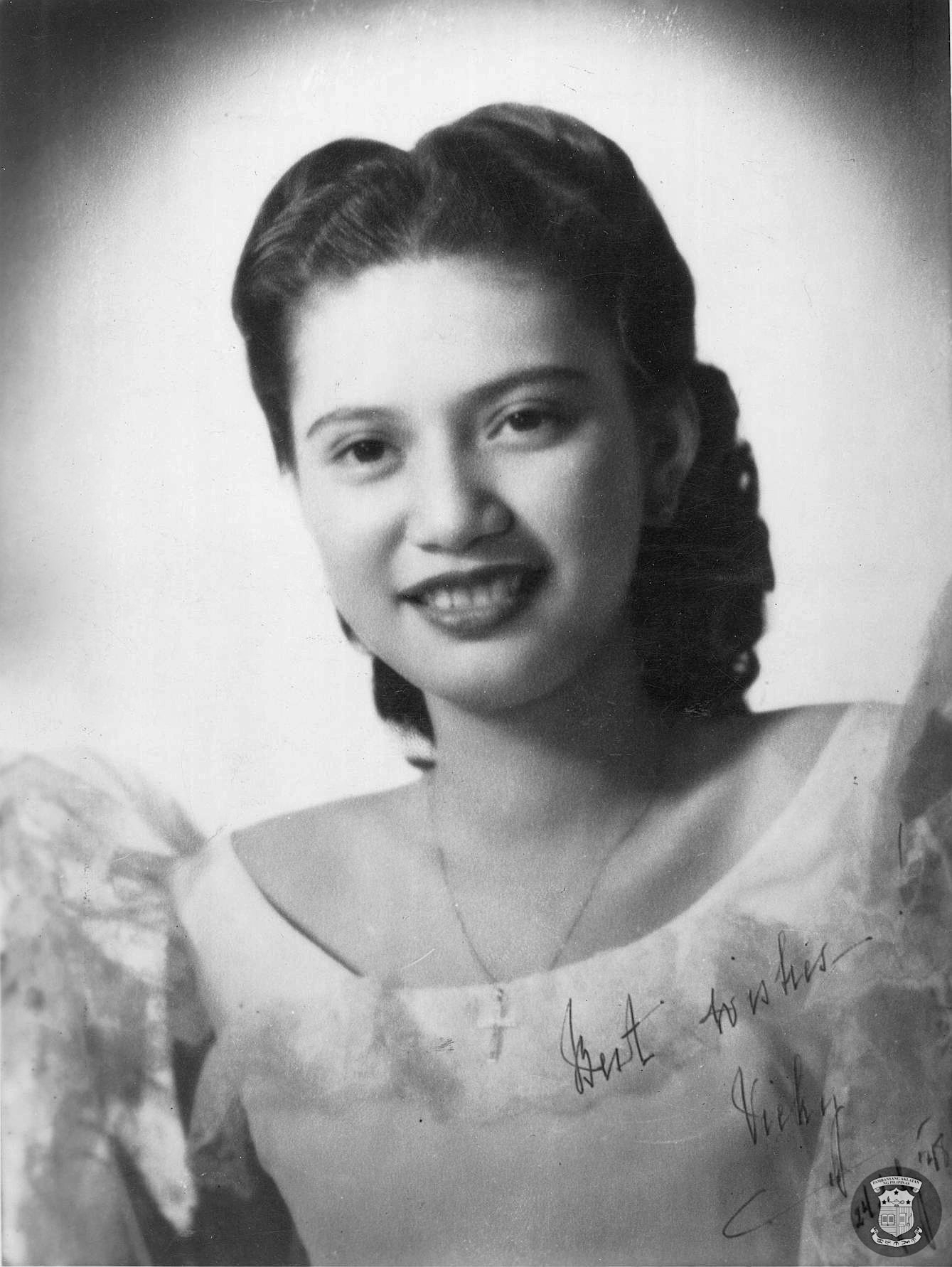
His daughter Victoria served as the First Lady during his presidency

On June 25, 1950, the world was astonished to hear the North Korean aggression against the independent South Korea. The United Nations immediately took up this challenge to the security of this part of the world. Carlos Romulo soon stood out as the most effective spokesman for the South Korean cause. On behalf of the government, Romulo offered to send a Philippine military contingent to be under the overall command of General Douglas MacArthur, who had been named United Nations supreme commander for the punitive expedition. The Philippines, thus, became the first country to join the United States in the offer of military assistance to beleaguered South Korea.

President Quirino took the necessary steps to make the Philippine offer. On a purely voluntary basis, the first contingent – the Tenth Battalion Combat Team – was formed under Colonel Azurin, and dispatched to Korea, where its members quickly won much renown for their military skill and bravery. The name of Captain Jose Artiaga Jr., heroically killed in action, stands out as a symbol of the country's contribution to the cause of freedom outside native shores. Other Philippine Combat Teams successively replaced the first contingent sent, and they all built a name for discipline, tenacity, and courage, until the armistice that brought the conflict to a halt.

==== Quirino-Foster Agreement ====
By the time of the creation of the Integrity Board, the Bell Mission, led by American banker Daniel W. Bell and composed of five members with a staff of twenty workers, following their period of stay in the Philippines, beginning in July 1950, finally submitted its report on October of the same year. The report made several proposals, most noteworthy, of which were that the United States on, President Quirino gamely and patriotically, took in the recommendations and sought to implement them. Thus, in November 1950, President Quirino and William Chapman Foster, representing the United States government, signed an agreement by virtue of which the former pledged to obtain the necessary Philippine legislation, in keeping with the Bell Mission Report, while envoy Foster promised the necessary by the same report.

The agreement also called for renegotiating the Bell Trade Agreement and signing a Treaty of Friendship, Commerce, and Navigation for the U.S. recognition of the Philippines’ independence. Senator Claro M. Recto labeled this a “mendicant foreign policy” since it allowed U.S. advisors into government offices, leading to official American intervention in the country's government and economy.

However, much as he tried to become a good president, Quirino failed to win the people's affection. Several factors caused the unpopularity of his administration, namely:

- Failure of the government to check the Huk threat that made travel in the provinces unsafe, as evidenced by the killing of former First Lady Aurora Quezon and her companions on April 28, 1949, by the Huks on the Bongabong-Baler Road in Baler, Tayabas (now part of Aurora);
- Economic distress of the times, aggravated by rising unemployment rate, soaring prices of commodities, and unfavorable balance of trade.

==== Executive clemency to Japanese war criminals ====
On July 4, 1953, during the final year of his presidency, Quirino made a historic and controversial act of clemency by granting pardons to 114 Japanese prisoners of war who had been convicted for atrocities committed during the Second World War, including acts perpetrated during the Japanese occupation of the Philippines. Many of these prisoners had been held at the New Bilibid Prison in Muntinlupa.

Quirino, whose own wife, three of his children, and several relatives had been killed by Japanese forces during the Battle of Manila, explained that his decision was driven by a desire for reconciliation and peace in the region. He stated that he bore no personal hatred and hoped the gesture would promote healing and foster improved relations between the Philippines and Japan.

Alongside the clemency for Japanese war criminals, President Quirino also granted amnesty to 323 Filipinos who had been convicted of collaboration with the Japanese during the occupation. These collaborators had either held positions in the wartime Second Philippine Republic or had supported Japanese military operations in various capacities.

The dual acts of clemency were received with mixed reactions—praised by some as a magnanimous step towards forgiveness and criticised by others as a betrayal of the memory of wartime suffering. Nonetheless, Quirino's actions laid a foundation for post-war diplomatic normalisation with Japan and signalled a commitment to national healing.

== Post-presidency and death (1953–1956) ==
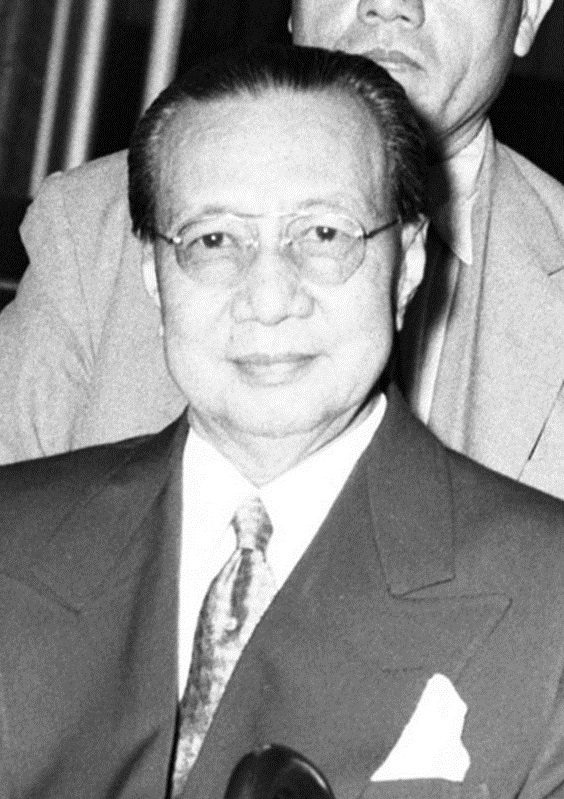
Quirino in his mid 60s

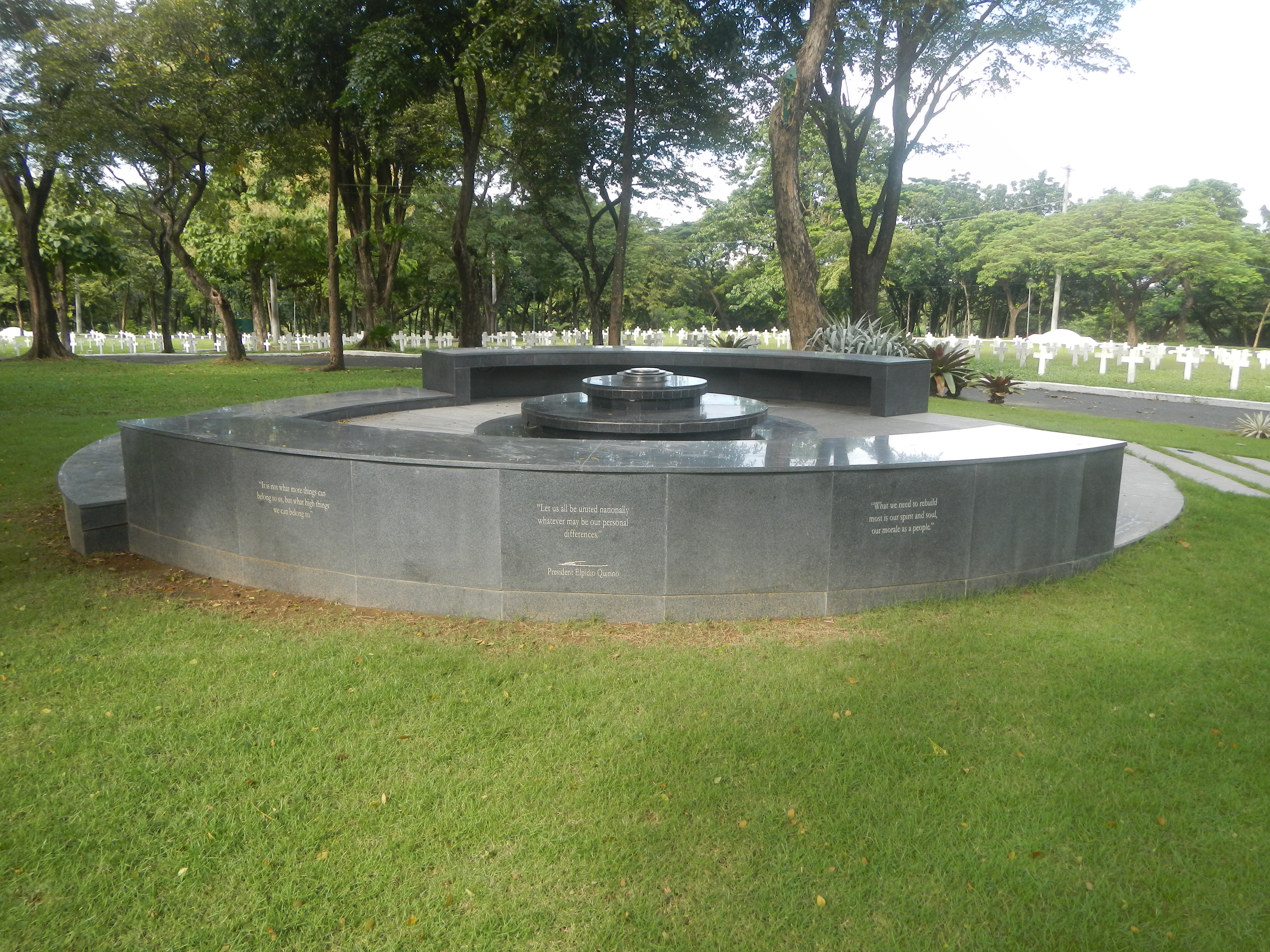
The present tomb of Elpidio Quirino at the Libingan ng mga Bayani.

Following his failed bid for re-election, Quirino retired to private life. He offered his dedication to serve the Filipino people, becoming the "Father of Foreign Service" in the Philippines.

In the evening of February 29, 1956, Quirino was preparing to attend a meeting when he suffered a massive heart attack. He died shortly thereafter at 6:35 pm, at the age of 65, at his retirement house in Novaliches, Quezon City. President Ramon Magsaysay later declared March 1 to 15 as a "period of national mourning", wherein all flags at all government establishments in the country were flown at half-mast as a sign of mourning. Quirino's remains lay in state at the Malacañang Palace from March 2 to 4. On March 5, a necrological service was held for him at the Legislative Building in Manila and his remains were later interred at the Manila South Cemetery.

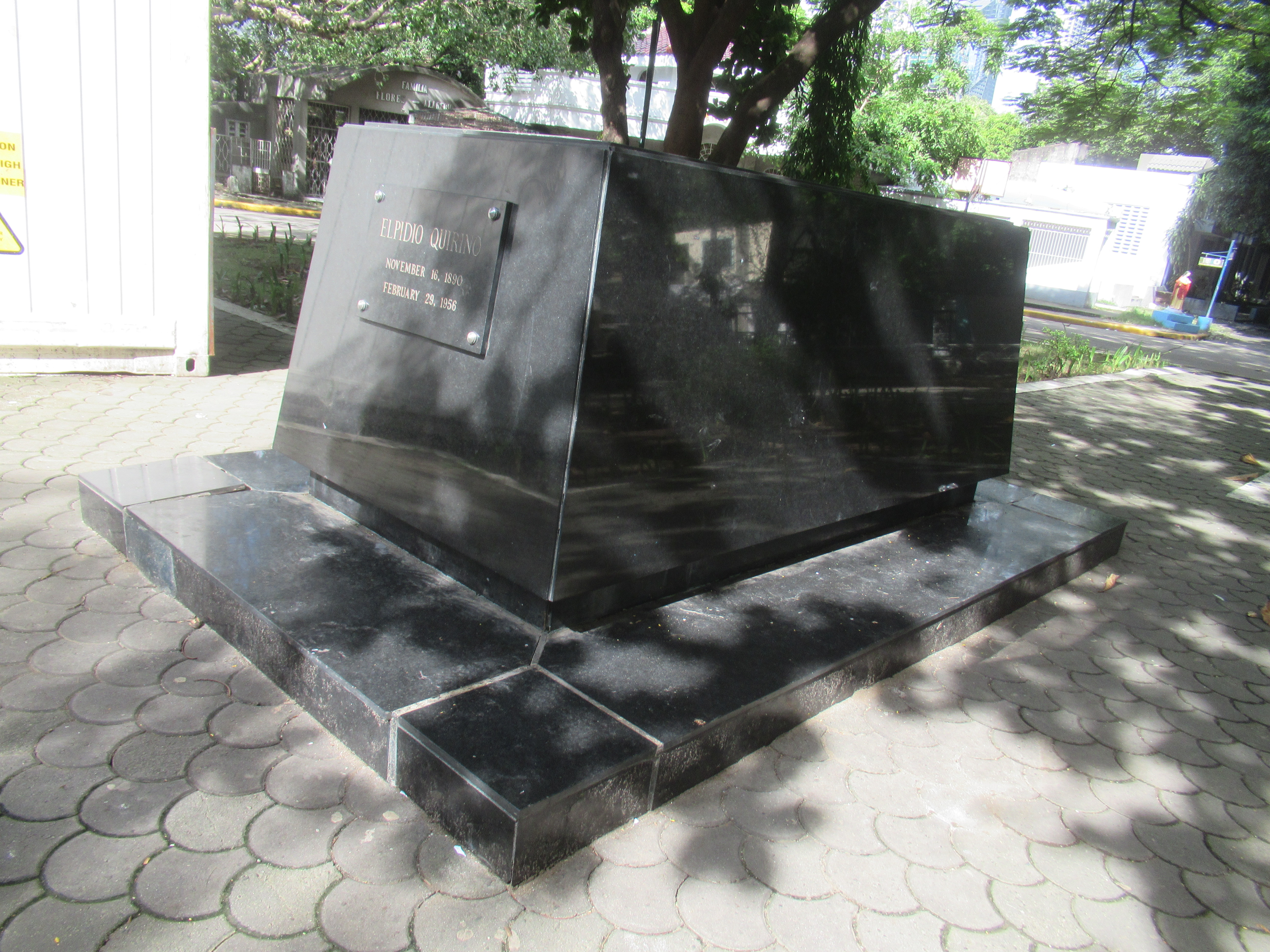
Quirino's tomb at Manila South Cemetery.

On February 29, 2016, his remains were relocated and reinterred at a special tomb site in the Libingan ng mga Bayani in Taguig, in time for the 60th anniversary of his death.

== Personal life ==
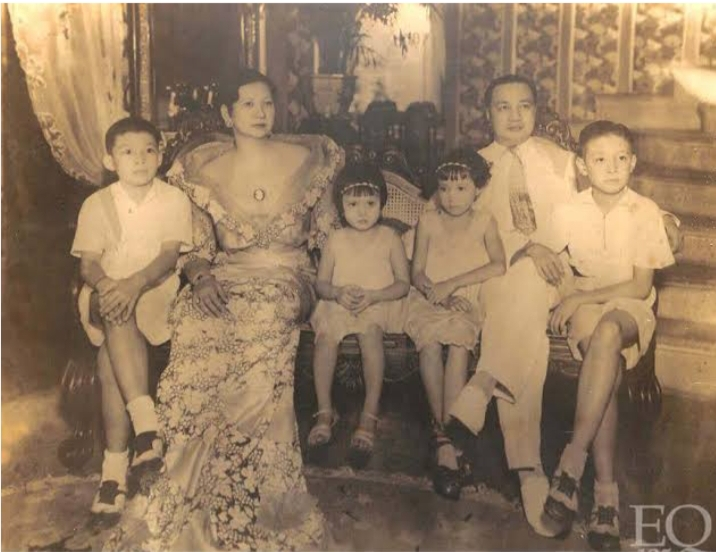
Quirino's family before World War II

Quirino was married to Alicia Syquía (1903–1945) on January 16, 1921. The couple had five children: Tomás, Armando, Norma, Victoria, and Fe Angela. On February 9, 1945, his wife and three of their children (Armando, Norma and Fe Angela) were killed by Japanese troops as they fled their home during the Battle of Manila. His brother Antonio Quirino was the owner of Alto Broadcasting System, which later merged with Chronicle Broadcasting Network to form the ABS-CBN Broadcasting Corporation.

His daughter, Victoria, became the youngest hostess of Malacañang Palace, at 16 years old, when Quirino ascended to the presidency on April 17, 1948. She married Luis M. Gonzalez in 1950, who became Philippine ambassador to Spain from 1966 to 1971.

== Honors ==
- : Presidential Medal of Merit – (July 2, 1955)
- : The Order of the Knights of Rizal, Knight Grand Cross of Rizal – KGCR.
- Foreign Awards
  - France:: Légion d'honneur, Grand Officer.
  - (Francoist Spain) Spain: Knight of the Collar of the Order of Isabella the Catholic (June 12, 1951)

== Memorials ==
There are a number of memorials dedicated to Quirino. In 1964, the municipality of Angaki in Ilocos Sur was renamed to Quirino in his honor. The province of Quirino, established in 1966, was named in his memory. Newer municipalities named after him, such as Quirino, Isabela and President Quirino, Sultan Kudarat, were later established in 1967 and 1973, respectively. Streets like the Quirino Avenue in Manila and Elpidio Quirino Avenue in Parañaque are named for him. The Novaliches–Ipo Road, where his retirement home is situated, was renamed as Quirino Highway. The Independence Grandstand in Manila's Rizal Park was also renamed to Quirino Grandstand in his honor.

Once the Quirino Avenue station of MRT Line 7 and the Quirino Highway station of the Metro Manila Subway commence operations, Quirino will have three train stations named after him, including the Quirino station of LRT Line 1.

In 2016, a memorial to him was established in Hibiya Park, Tokyo, Japan.

Yearly on November 16, special holidays in commemoration of his birth are observed at his home province of Ilocos Sur and La Union, respectively.

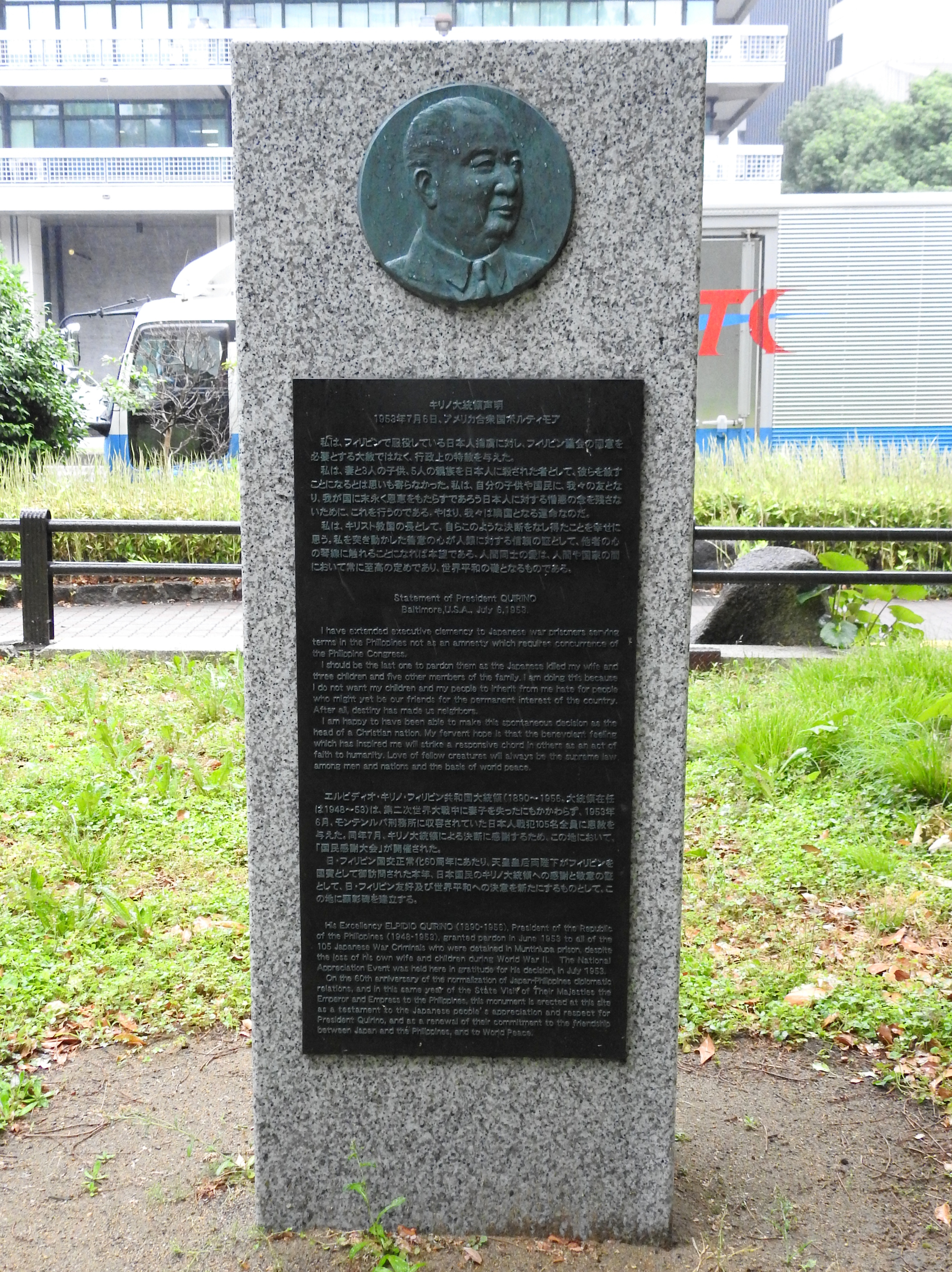
A memorial to Quirino in Hibiya Park, Tokyo, Japan

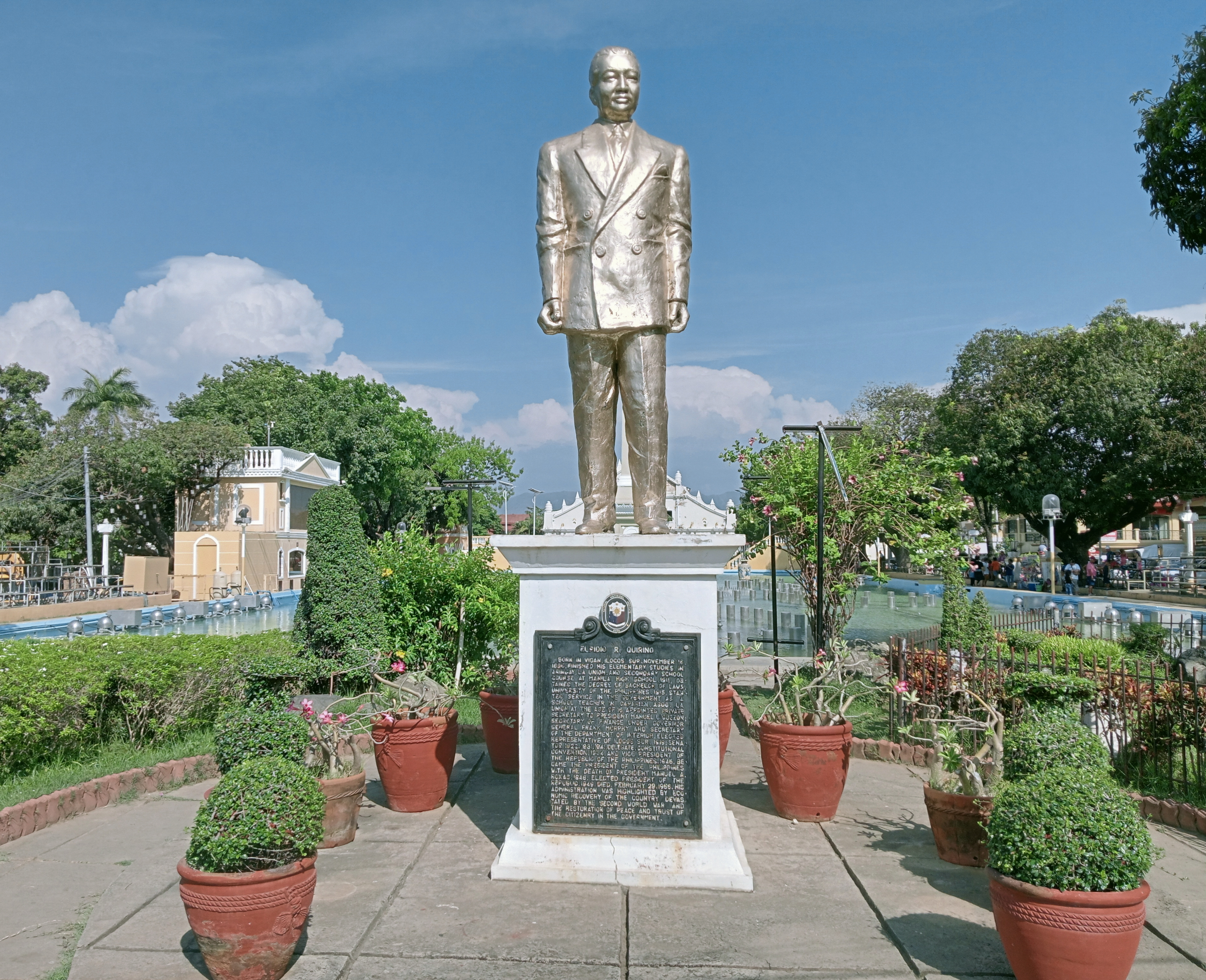
Elpidio Quirino Monument in Vigan, Ilocos Sur

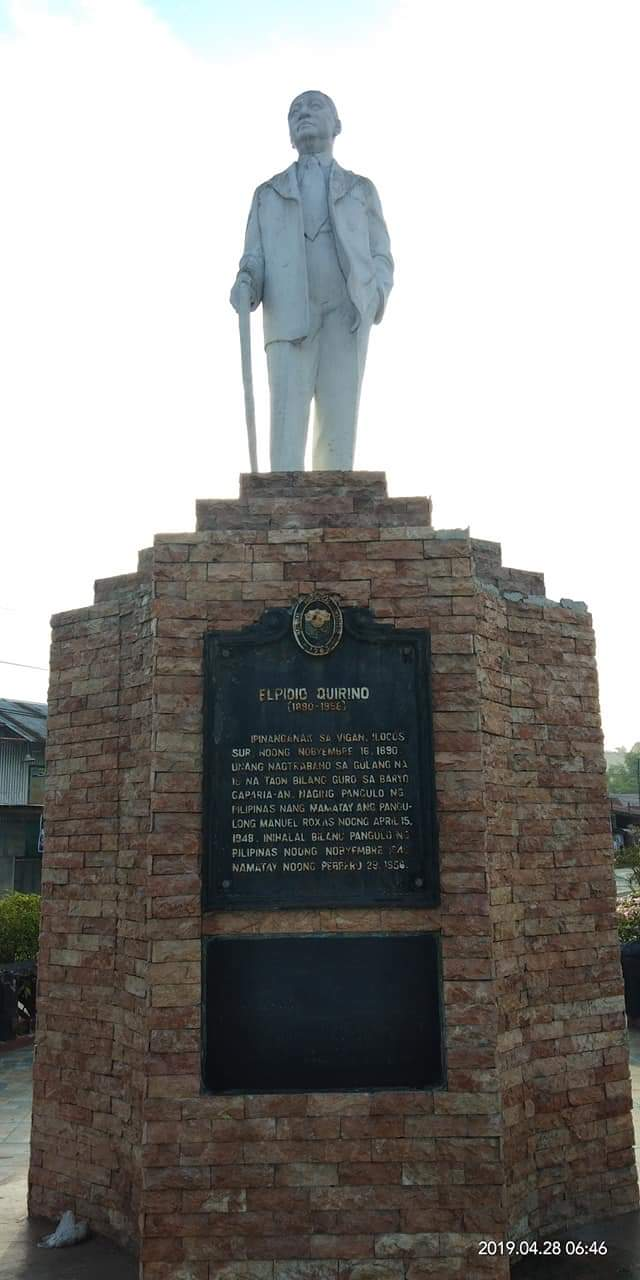
Elpidio Quirino Monument in Caba, La Union

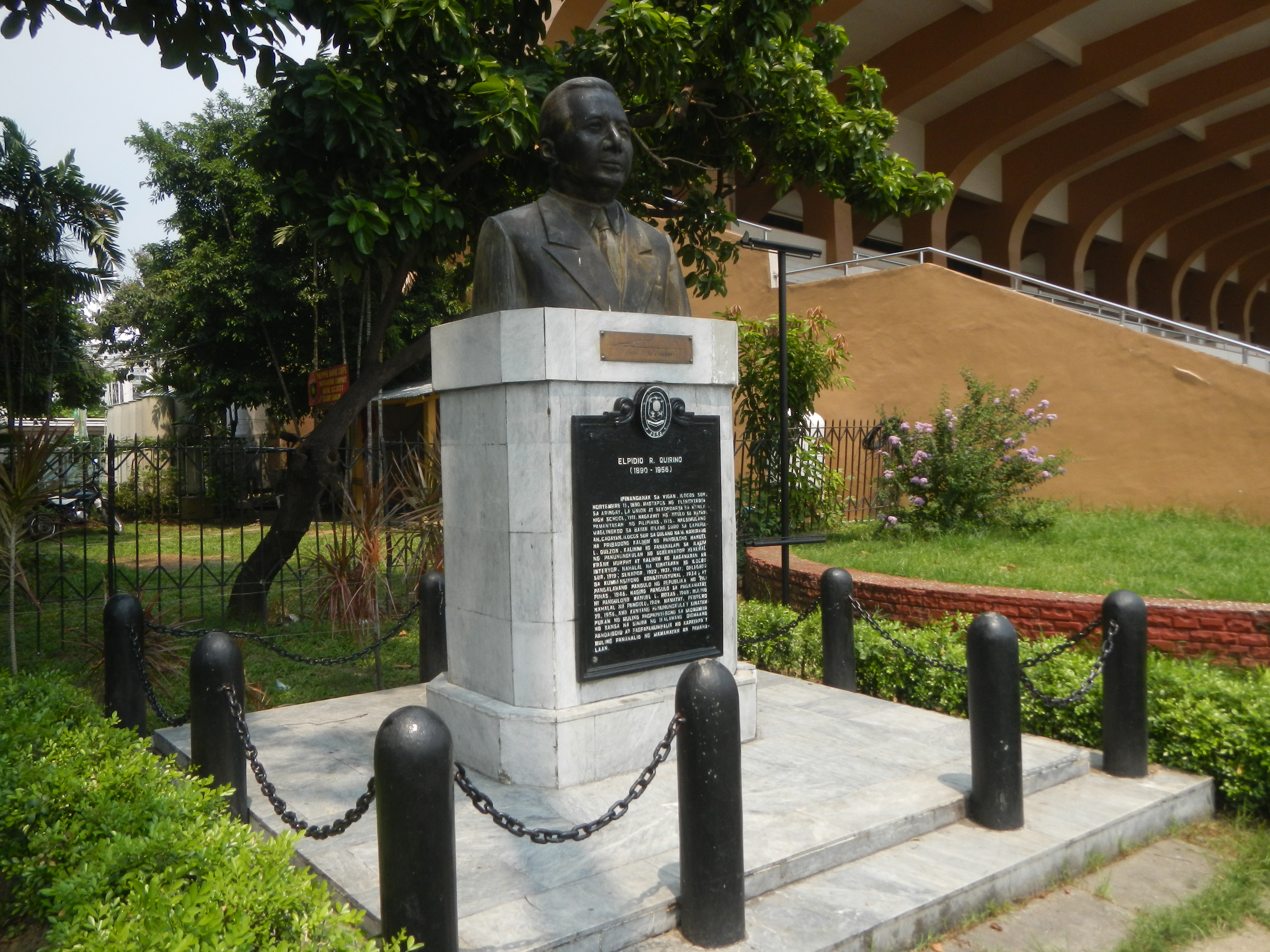
Bust of Quirino beside Quirino Grandstand, Manila

== Sources ==
- Zaide, Gregorio (1956). Philippine Political and Cultural History: the Philippines since British Invasion (1957 Revised ed.). Manila, Philippines: McCullough Printing Company.
- Zaide, Gregorio F. (1984). Philippine History and Government. National Bookstore Printing Press.

House of Representatives of the Philippines
Preceded by Alberto Reyes	Member of the Philippine House of Representatives from Ilocos Sur's 1st district 1919–1922	Succeeded by Vicente Singson Pablo
Senate of the Philippines
Preceded by Santiago Fonacier	Senator of the Philippines from the 1st district 1925–1935; Served alongside: Isabelo de los Reyes (1925–1928) and Melecio Arranz (1928–1935)	Position abolished
Political offices
Preceded by Vicente Encarnacion	Secretary of Finance; 1934–1936	Succeeded by Antonio de Las Alas
Preceded by Severino de las Alas	Secretary of the Interior; 1935–1938	Succeeded by Rafael Alunan
Preceded by José Avelino; Acting	President pro tempore of the Senate of the Philippines; 1945–1946	Succeeded by Melecio Arranz
Preceded by Jaime Hernandez	Secretary of Finance; 1946	Succeeded by Miguel Cuaderno
Recreated Title last held by Felipe Buencamino as Secretary of Foreign Relations	Secretary of Foreign Affairs; 1946–1950	Succeeded by Felino Neri
Preceded by Sergio Osmeña	Vice President of the Philippines; 1946–1948	Vacant Title next held by Fernando López
Preceded by Manuel Roxas	President of the Philippines; 1948–1953	Succeeded by Ramon Magsaysay
Party political offices
Preceded by José Avelino	President of the Liberal Party; 1949–1950	Succeeded by Eugenio Pérez
First	Liberal Party nominee for Vice President of the Philippines; 1946	Succeeded by Fernando Lopez
Preceded by Manuel Roxas	Liberal Party nominee for President of the Philippines; 1949 (under Quirino wing), 1953; With: José Avelino (Avelino wing, 1949)	Succeeded by José Yulo
