= Victoria Quirino-Gonzalez =

First Lady of the Philippines from 1948 to 1953

Victoria Quirino
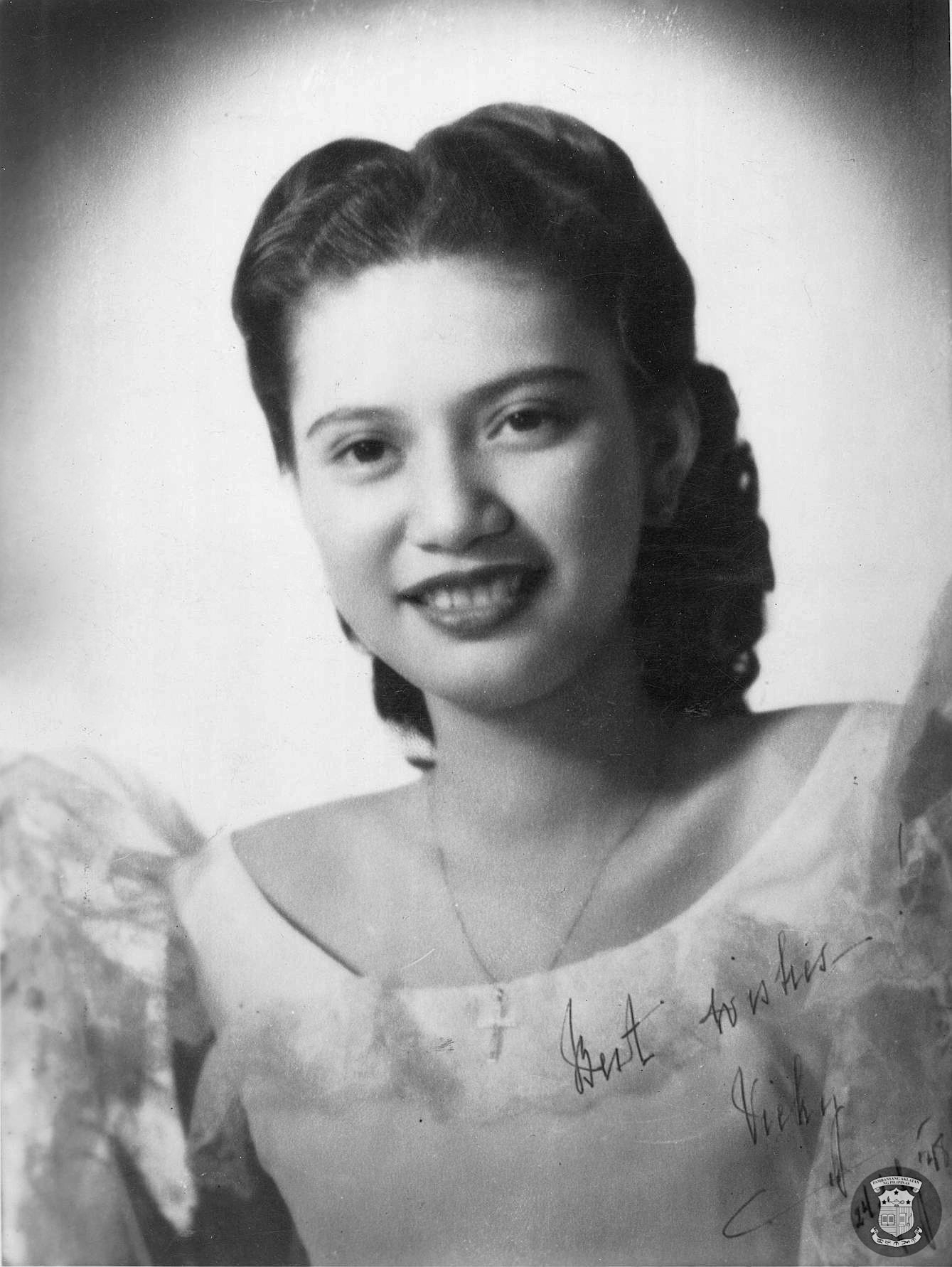
- Official portrait, 1948

First Lady of the Philippines
- In role April 17, 1948 – December 30, 1953
- President: Elpidío Quiríno
- Preceded by: Trinidad Roxas
- Succeeded by: Luz Magsaysay

Personal details
- Born: Victoria Syquia Quirino; May 18, 1931 Manila, Philippine Islands
- Died: November 29, 2006 (aged 75) Amsterdam, Netherlands
- Resting place: Manila Memorial Park – Sucat
- Spouses: Luis Gonzalez (m. 1950; died 1984) Francisco Delgado (m. 1987)
- Parent(s): Elpidio Quirino (father); Alicia Syquia (mother)

Victoria "Vicky" Quirino González (born Victoria Syquia Quirino; May 18, 1931 – November 29, 2006) was the second daughter of President Elpidio Quirino. Since her father was a widower, she served as First Lady of the Philippines, becoming the youngest bearer of the title at the age of 16.

Her mother, Alicia Syquia, as well as three of her siblings were massacred by Japanese troops as they occupied the country during the Second World War.

== Term ==
She assumed the title in 1948 when President Manuel Roxas died and her father, then Vice-President of the Philippines succeeded him. When her father's term ended in 1953, she was succeeded by Luz Magsaysay.

Following tradition, Quiríno-González became involved in socio-civic activities. She was the second Presidential daughter to have a debut in Malacañan Palace, and again made history as the first Presidential daughter to be wed in the Palace when she married her first husband, Luis "Chito" González.

== Later years ==
She was silently but actively involved in supporting social causes in her later years. Her grandchildren include Victoria Álvarez de Toledo y González, María Álvarez de Toledo y González, and Lucía Álvarez de Toledo y González, daughters of her own daughter María Victoria González Quiríno and Spanish nobleman Manuel Álvarez de Toledo y Mencos, the 5th Duke of Zaragoza, 13th Count of Los Arcos, Marquis of Miraflores, and three times a Grandee of Spain.

== Death ==
Victoria died on November 29, 2006, at the age of 75 in Amsterdam, Netherlands.

Honorary titles
Preceded by Trinidad Roxas	First Lady of the Philippines; 1948–1953	Succeeded by Luz Magsaysay
