= First ladies and gentlemen of the Philippines =

Host of Malacañang Palace

First Lady of the Philippines
- Unang Ginang ng Pilipinas
- Incumbent; Liza Araneta Marcos since June 30, 2022
- Style: Her Excellency
- Residence: Bahay Pangulo
- Inaugural holder: Hilaria Aguinaldo (Note: The term "First Lady" was first used for Victoria Quirino-González, who was the daughter of President Elpidio Quirino.)
- Formation: January 23, 1899

The first lady or first gentleman of the Philippines (Filipino: Unang Ginang o Unang Ginoó ng Pilipinas) is the courtesy title given to the host or hostess of Malacañang Palace, the residence of the head of state and head of government of the Philippines.

The title is traditionally held by the consort of the president of the Philippines, and as such is used to interchangeably refer to the spouse of the incumbent; however, this is rarely the case, especially for presidents without a living spouse at the time of their tenure. The position, which is customary in nature and dignity, merits no official remuneration from the state.

Liza Araneta Marcos is the current first lady of the Philippines, as wife of the 17th and current president of the Philippines, Bongbong Marcos.

== Terminology ==
The host of the Malacañang Palace, who is usually the consort of the president, has been referred to in English as the "first lady" (Filipino: Unang Ginang). As Gloria Macapagal Arroyo took office as the first female president who is not a widow, the masculine form "first gentleman" (abbreviated FG; Filipino: Unang Ginoó) was used for her husband, Jose Miguel Arroyo.

== Role ==
The position of first lady or first gentleman is not an elected position, carries no official duties, and has no personal remuneration. Nonetheless, the title holder participates in humanitarian and charitable work on behalf of the president, often in line with his or her policies and programmes. Furthermore, many of the holders of this post have taken an active role in campaigning for the president, or have participated in public life through some other manner.

Imelda Marcos was given a formal job as Governor of Metro Manila and as Minister of Human Settlements by her husband Ferdinand Marcos during his 21-year rule. She is also the first incumbent first lady to enter politics by winning a seat in the Interim Batasang Pambansa in 1978.

Two former first ladies later won seats in Congress after their husbands' tenures in office. In 1995, Marcos herself became the first former first lady to win a seat in the House of Representatives. In 2001, Loi Ejercito became the first former first lady to win a seat in the Senate.

== List ==
President No.	Portrait	Name	Tenure	Age at tenure start	President (Spouse, unless noted)
1	Portrait of Hilaria Aguinaldo	Hilaria Aguinaldo; February 17, 1877 – March 6, 1921 (aged 44)	January 23, 1899 – March 23, 1901	21 years, 340 days	Emilio Aguinaldo m. January 1, 1896 sep. 1905 (Note: A copy of Hilaria del Rosario's 1920 Last will and testament stated that she and Aguinaldo were separated for 15 years at the time the document was crafted. Based on the document, the separation happened in 1905)
2	Portrait of Aurora Quezon	Aurora Quezon; February 19, 1888 – April 28, 1949 (aged 61)	November 15, 1935 – August 1, 1944	47 years, 269 days	Manuel L. Quezon m. December 17, 1918
3	Portrait of Pacencia Laurel	Pacencia Laurel; April 30, 1889 – January 1, 1963 (aged 73)	October 14, 1943 – August 17, 1945	54 years, 167 days	José P. Laurel m. April 9, 1911
4	Portrait of Esperanza Osmeña	Esperanza Osmeña; December 18, 1894 – April 4, 1978 (aged 83)	August 1, 1944 – May 28, 1946	49 years, 227 days	Sergio Osmeña m. January 10, 1920
5	Portrait of Trinidad Roxas	Trinidad Roxas; October 4, 1900 – June 20, 1995 (aged 94)	May 28, 1946 – April 15, 1948	45 years, 236 days	Manuel Roxas m. April 14, 1921
6	Portrait of Victoria Quirino	Victoria Quirino; May 18, 1931 – November 29, 2006 (aged 75)	April 17, 1948 – December 30, 1953	16 years, 335 days	Elpidio Quirino; Daughter (Note: Quirino's spouse, Alicia Quirino, was massacred along with the rest of the family during the Japanese occupation of the Philippines in World War II before he became president. Their daughter, Victoria, was considered First Lady.)
7	Portrait of Luz Magsaysay	Luz Magsaysay; June 25, 1914 – August 17, 2004 (aged 90)	December 30, 1953 – March 17, 1957	39 years, 188 days	Ramon Magsaysay m. June 16, 1933
8	Portrait of Leonila Garcia	Leonila Garcia; July 17, 1906 – May 17, 1994 (aged 87)	March 18, 1957 – December 30, 1961	50 years, 244 days	Carlos P. Garcia m. May 24, 1933
9	Portrait of Eva Macapagal	Eva Macapagal; November 1, 1915 – May 16, 1999 (aged 83)	December 30, 1961 – December 30, 1965	46 years, 59 days	Diosdado Macapagal m. May 5, 1946
10	Portrait of Imelda Marcos	Imelda Marcos; Born July 2, 1929 (age 97)	December 30, 1965 – February 25, 1986	36 years, 181 days	Ferdinand Marcos m. April 17, 1954
11	Vacant				Corazon Aquino; Widow (Note: Aquino's spouse, Benigno Aquino Jr., was assassinated before she became president. Her daughter Ballsy was considered as de facto First Lady.)
12	Portrait of Amelita Ramos	Amelita Ramos; Born December 29, 1926 (age 99)	June 30, 1992 – June 30, 1998	62 years, 184 days	Fidel Ramos m. October 21, 1954
13	Portrait of Loi Ejercito	Loi Ejercito; Born June 2, 1930 (age 96)	June 30, 1998 – January 20, 2001	68 years, 28 days	Joseph Estrada m. December 6, 1959
14	Portrait of Jose Miguel Arroyo	Jose Miguel Arroyo; Born June 27, 1945 (age 81)	January 20, 2001 – June 30, 2010	55 years, 207 days	Gloria Macapagal Arroyo m. August 2, 1968
15	Vacant				Benigno Aquino III; Bachelor (Note: Aquino was a lifelong bachelor, but his sisters served as unofficial first ladies. Malacañang Palace also hired professionals to host state banquets.)
16	Vacant				Rodrigo Duterte; None designated (Note: Duterte's marriage with Elizabeth Zimmerman was annulled before he became president. His domestic partner at the time of his presidency, Honeylet Avanceña, was never designated as First Lady but has occasionally taken on the duties of first lady.)
17	Portrait of Louise Araneta Marcos	Liza Araneta-Marcos; Born August 21, 1959 (age 67)	June 30, 2022	62 years, 313 days	Bongbong Marcos m. April 17, 1993

== Non-spouses who held the distinction ==
On a few occasions, individuals who are not spouses of the incumbent president have temporarily performed tasks reserved for the first lady or first gentleman, effectively rendering them as the de facto holder of the position; most often they are a direct relative of the president. To date, only Elpidio Quirino, Corazon Aquino, and Benigno Aquino III had no spouse to assume the title of First Lady or First Gentleman. Rodrigo Duterte did not appoint a first lady despite having Honeylet Avanceña as his common-law wife. In the case of Quirino, his daughter received the title as he was a widower upon his accession.

Victoria Quirino-Gonzalez was the first lady for her father, Elpidio Quirino. She was made the official host of the Malacañang Palace. However Victoria is regarded as the first to be named with the role of first lady. The spouses of previous presidents, from Emilio Aguinaldo to Manuel Roxas, were not given the title during their respective husbands' terms.

== Presidencies with no regular first lady or gentlemen ==
=== Benigno Aquino III ===
Benigno Aquino III never married, so the palace hired professionals to manage tasks and duties customarily reserved for the first lady, such as organizing state dinners.

On some occasions, he charged one or more of his sisters with entertaining local and foreign dignitaries. During the 2015 APEC summit hosted in Pasay, his youngest sister, Kris Aquino served as temporary first lady for the event. Their other sisters, Ballsy Aquino-Cruz, Pinky Aquino-Abelleda, and Viel Aquino-Dee, also assisted him in his various duties.

=== Rodrigo Duterte ===
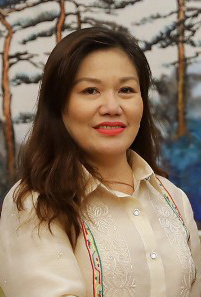
Honeylet Avanceña, the partner of President Rodrigo Duterte, has taken on the duties of first lady on several state functions despite not being designated as such during Duterte's presidency.

Prior to his inauguration, incumbent Rodrigo Duterte declared his eldest daughter Sara would be the first lady despite having Honeylet Avanceña as his common-law wife. He was previously married to Elizabeth Zimmerman; their marriage was annulled in 2000.

However, Sara Duterte was already mayor-elect of Davao City, and declined the offer. Following her filing of a 10-day leave of absence until June 22, there were speculations that she did so to assume the role of first lady, but she neither denied or confirmed speculations. Former Department of the Interior and Local Government secretary Rafael Alunan suggested that Vice-President Leni Robredo serve as de facto first lady but this never materialised.

Avanceña nevertheless would fulfill roles usually conducted by the first lady such as during the official visit of Japanese prime minister Shinzo Abe, and the 30th ASEAN Summit in 2017.

== See also ==
- President of the Philippines
- List of presidents of the Philippines
- List of ancient Philippine consorts
- Malacañang Palace
- First lady
