= History of the Philippines (1946–1965) =

Republic of the Philippines: Repúblika ng Pilipinas (Filipino)
- 1946–1965
- Flag Coat of arms
- Anthem: Lupang Hinirang (English: "Chosen Land")
- Great Seal

- Location of the Philippines in Southeast Asia.
- Capital: Manila (before 1948); Quezon City (after 1948)
- Largest city: Manila
- Official languages: Spanish; English; Tagalog
- Religion: Catholicism; Protestantism; Islam
- Government: Unitary presidential constitutional republic
- President
  - 1946–1948: Manuel Roxas
  - 1948–1953: Elpidio Quirino
  - 1953–1957: Ramon Magsaysay
  - 1957–1961: Carlos P. Garcia
  - 1961–1965: Diosdado Macapagal
- Vice President
  - 1946–1948: Elpidio Quirino
  - 1949–1953: Fernando Lopez
  - 1953–1957: Carlos P. Garcia
  - 1957–1961: Diosdado Macapagal
  - 1961–1965: Emmanuel Pelaez
- Legislature: Congress
  - Upper house: Senate
  - Lower house: House of Representatives
- History
  - Treaty of Manila: July 4, 1946
  - Disestablished: December 30, 1965
- Currency: Philippine peso (₱)
- Time zone: UTC+08:00 (PST)
- ISO 3166 code: PH
Preceded by	Succeeded by
Commonwealth of the Philippines	History of the Philippines (1965–1986)
- Today part of: Philippines

The history of the Philippines from 1946 to 1965 covers the aftermath of World War II, the post-independence period, and much of the existence of the Third Republic of the Philippines, during which the country was governed under the 1935 Constitution of the Philippines until the end of the presidency of Diosdado Macapagal in 1965.

== Recognition of independence ==
Proclamation of independence

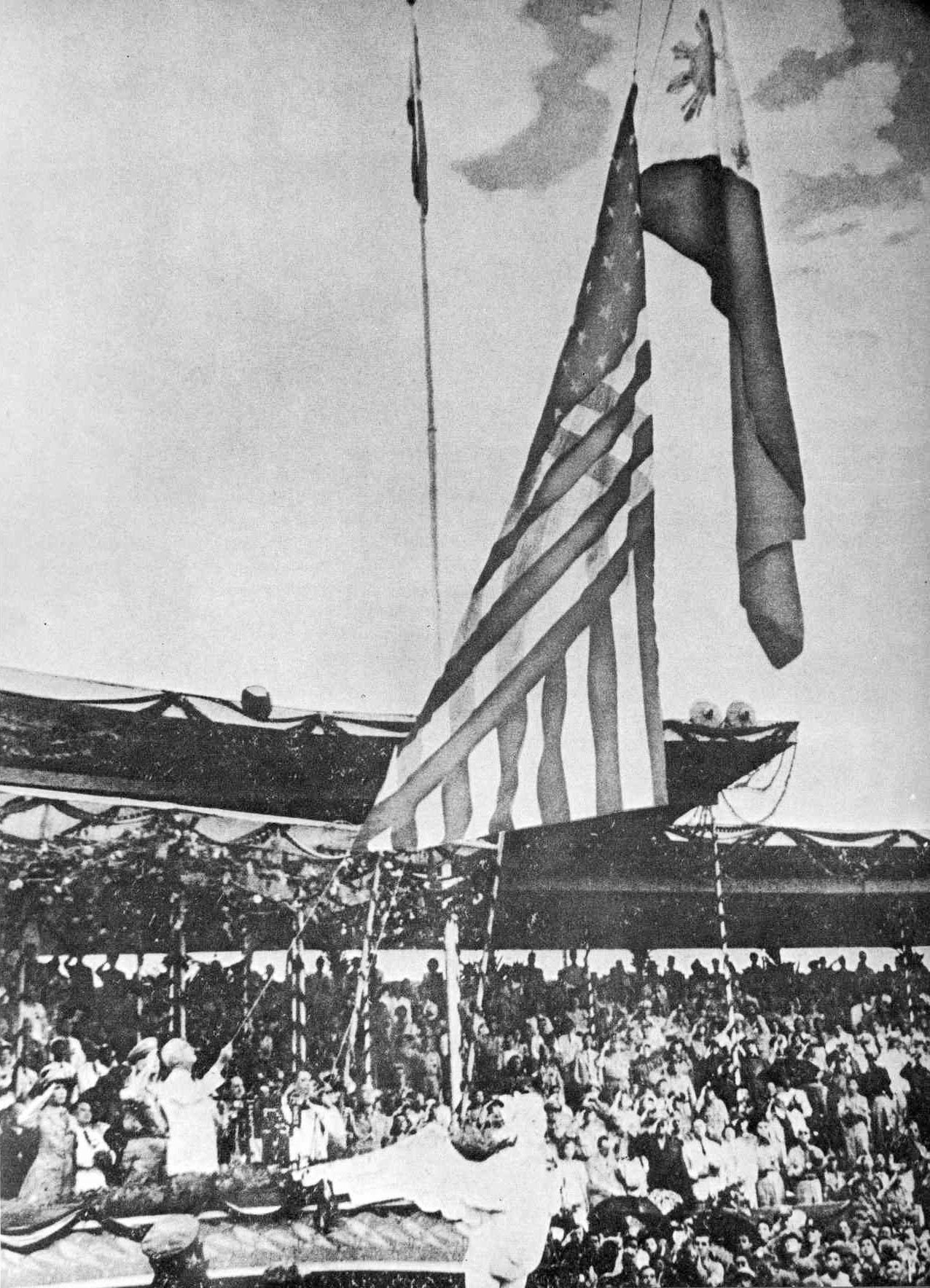
The Flag of the United States is lowered while the Flag of the Philippines is raised during the Independence Day ceremonies on July 4, 1946

The United States granted independence to the Philippines on July 4, 1946. In accordance with the Philippine Independence Act (more popularly known as the "Tydings–McDuffie Act"), President Harry S. Truman issued Proclamation 2695 of July 4, 1946, officially recognizing the independence of the Philippines.

On the same day, representatives of the United States and of the Philippines signed a Treaty of General Relations between the two governments. The treaty provided for the recognition of the independence of the Republic of the Philippines as of July 4, 1946, and the relinquishment of American sovereignty over the Philippine Islands.

The U.S. retained dozens of military bases, including a few major ones. In addition, independence was qualified by legislation passed by the U.S. Congress. For example, the Bell Trade Act provided a mechanism whereby U.S. import quotas might be established on Philippine articles which "are coming, or are likely to come, into substantial competition with like articles the product of the United States". It further required U.S. citizens and corporations be granted equal access to Philippine minerals, forests, and other natural resources. In hearings before the Senate Committee on Finance, Assistant Secretary of State for Economic Affairs William Clayton described the law as "clearly inconsistent with the basic foreign economic policy of this country" and "clearly inconsistent with our promise to grant the Philippines genuine independence."

The Philippine government had little choice but to accept these terms for independence. Congress was threatening to withhold post-World War II rebuilding funds unless the Bell Act was ratified. The Philippine Congress obliged on July 2, 1946.

After independence, the U.S. continued to direct the country through Central Intelligence Agency operatives like Edward Lansdale. As Raymond Bonner and other historians note, Lansdale strongly influenced President Ramon Magsaysay, going so far as to knock him out when the Philippine leader delivered a speech written by a Filipino and that American agents also drugged sitting President Elpidio Quirino and discussed assassinating Senator Claro Recto. Prominent Filipino historian Roland G. Simbulan has called the CIA "US imperialism's clandestine apparatus in the Philippines."

=== Independence Day shifted ===
The Philippines currently celebrates its Independence Day on June 12, the anniversary of Emilio Aguinaldo's declaration of independence from Spain in 1898. The declaration was not recognised by the United States which, after defeating the Spanish in the Battle of Manila Bay in May that year, acquired the Philippine Islands via the Treaty of Paris that ended the Spanish–American War.

From 1946 to 1961, the Philippines observed Independence Day on July 4. On May 12, 1962, President Macapagal issued Presidential Proclamation No. 28 proclaiming June 12, 1962, as a special public holiday throughout the Philippines. In 1964, Republic Act No. 4166 changed the date of Independence Day from July 4 to June 12 and renamed the July 4 holiday as Philippine Republic Day.

== Roxas administration (1946–1948) ==
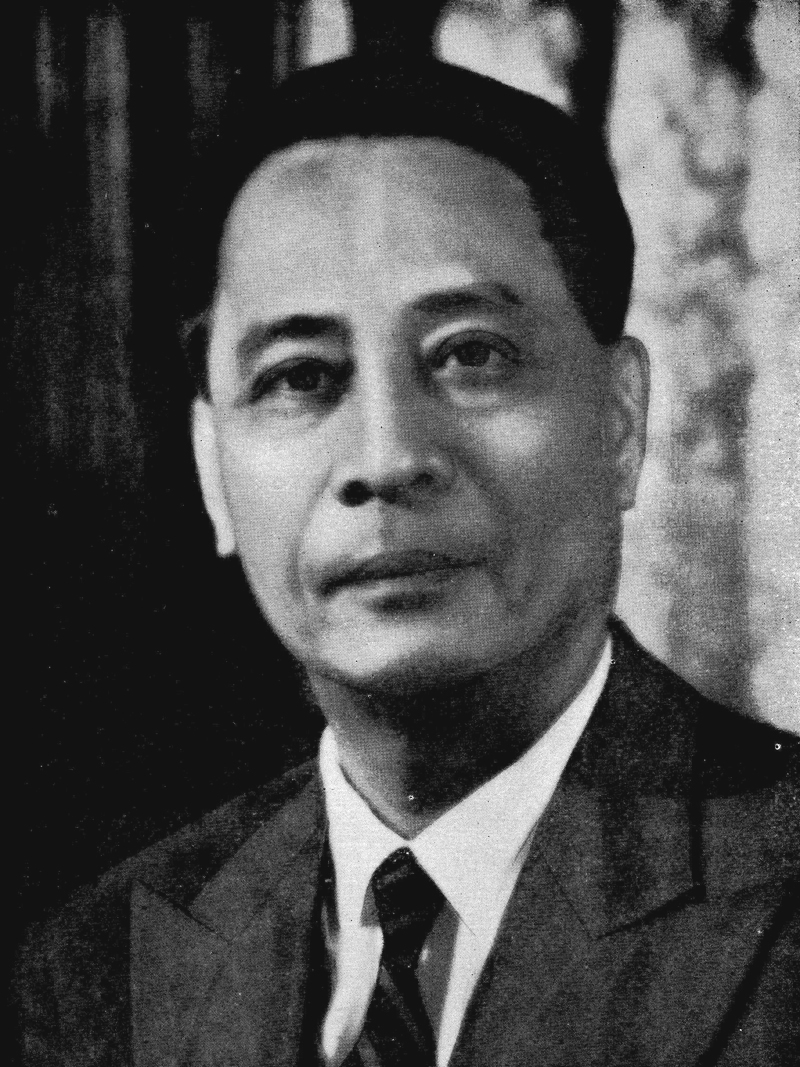
Manuel Roxas, president from 1946 to 1948

When the Congress of the Philippines was convened in 1945, the legislators elected in 1941 chose Manuel Roxas as Senate President. In the Philippine national elections of 1946, Roxas ran for president as the nominee of the liberal wing of the Nacionalista Party. He had the staunch support of General MacArthur. His opponent was Sergio Osmeña, who refused to campaign, saying that the Filipino people knew his reputation. In the April 23, 1946 election, Roxas won 54 percent of the vote, and the Liberal Party won a majority in the legislature. When the Philippines gained independence from the United States on July 4, 1946, Roxas became the first president of the new republic.

On March 14, 1947, a military bases agreement between the Philippines and the US entered into force, granting the right to retain the use of certain military bases for a period of 99 years, with some restrictions. On signing that agreement, Roxas remarked that it strengthened Philippine national defense and assured the peace of the Pacific.

Although Roxas was successful in getting rehabilitation funds from the United States after independence, he was forced to concede trade restrictions for the Philippine citizens, and special privileges for U.S. property owners and investors. His administration was marred by graft and corruption; moreover, the abuses of the provincial military police contributed to the rise of the left-wing Hukbalahap (Huk) movement in the countryside. His heavy-handed attempts to crush the Huks led to widespread peasant disaffection.

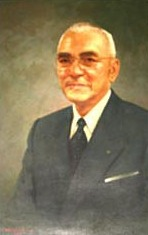
Chief Justice Manuel Moran

During Roxas' term of office administration of the Turtle Islands and Mangsee Islands was transferred by the United Kingdom to the Philippines. By an international treaty concluded in 1930 between the United States (in respect of its then overseas territory, the Philippine archipelago) and the United Kingdom (in respect of its then protectorate, the State of North Borneo) the two powers agreed the international boundaries between those respective territories. In that treaty the United Kingdom also accepted that the Turtle Islands as well as the Mangsee Islands were part of the Philippine archipelago and therefore under U.S. sovereignty. However, by a supplemental international treaty concluded at the same time, the two powers agreed that those islands, although part of the Philippines Archipelago, would remain under the administration of the State of North Borneo's British North Borneo Company. The supplemental treaty provided that the British North Borneo Company would continue to administer those islands unless and until the United States government gave notice to the United Kingdom calling for administration of the islands to be transferred to the U.S. The U.S. never gave such a notice. On the 4th of July, 1946, an independent Philippines was born. It became the successor to the U.S. under the treaties of 1930. On July 15, 1946, the United Kingdom annexed the State of North Borneo and, in the view of the United Kingdom, became the sovereign power with respect to what had been the State of North Borneo. On September 19, 1946, the Philippines notified the United Kingdom that it wished to take over the administration of the Turtle Islands, Tawi-Tawi and the Mangesse Islands. Pursuant to a supplemental international agreement, the transfer of administration became effective on October 16, 1947.

Roxas did not stay long in office because of a heart attack as he was speaking at Clark Air Base on April 15, 1948. He was succeeded by his vice president Elpidio Quirino.

== Quirino administration (1948–1953) ==
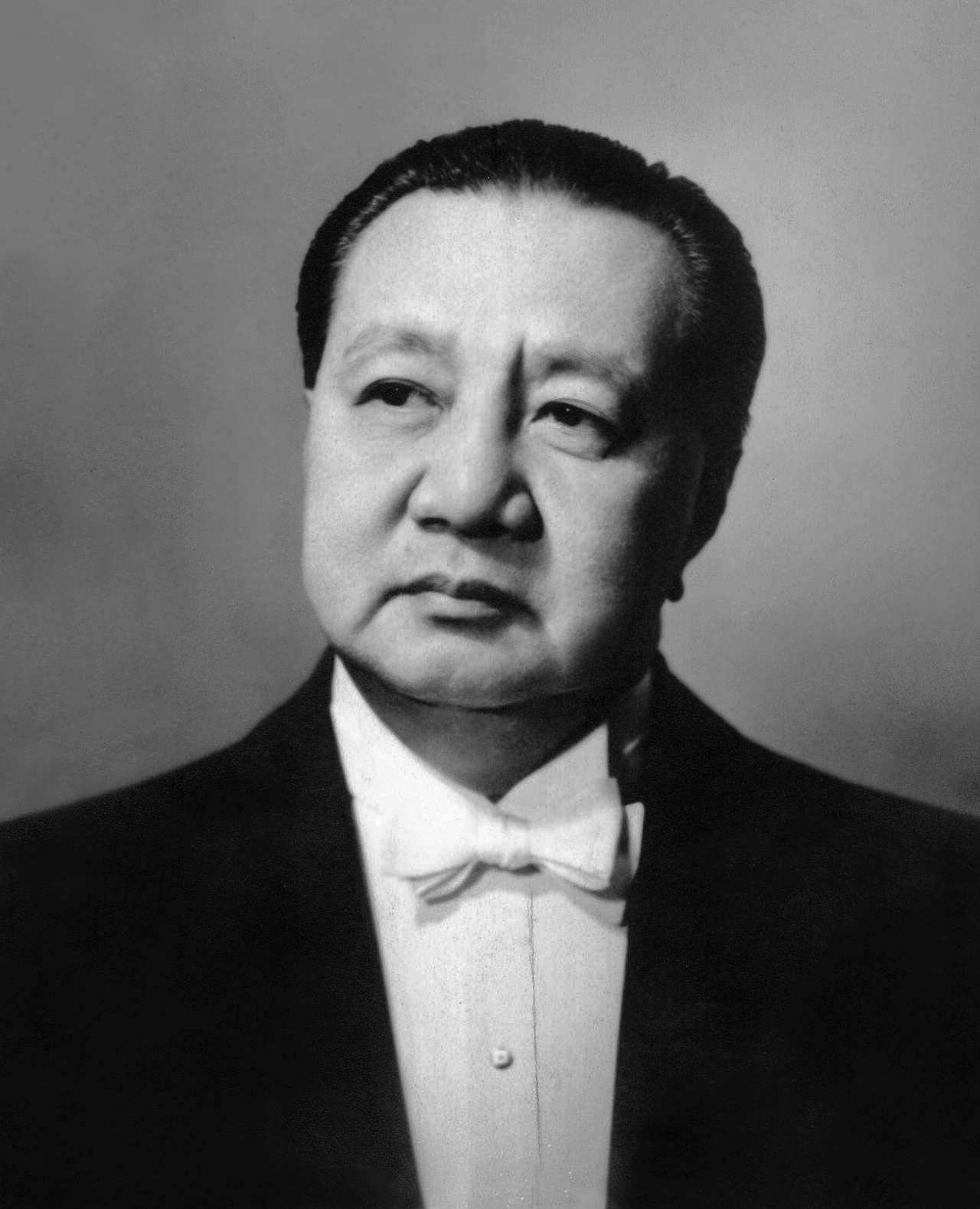
Elpidio Quirino, president from 1948 to 1953

Quirino assumed the presidency on April 17, 1948, taking his oath of office two days after the death of Manuel Roxas. In 1949 the wartime president, Jose P. Laurel of the Nacionalista Party, ran against Quirino in what has been described as a particularly corrupt and venal exercise in democracy. Although historians in general accept that Laurel was elected, he refused to challenge Quirino's declared victory with force.

Since Quirino was a widower, his surviving daughter Vicky would serve as the official hostess and perform the functions traditionally ascribed to the First Lady.

Quirino's administration faced a serious threat in the form of the communist Hukbalahap movement. Though the Huks originally had been an anti-Japanese guerrilla army in Luzon, communists steadily gained control over the leadership, and when Quirino's negotiation with Huk commander Luis Taruc broke down in 1948, Taruc openly declared himself a communist and called for the overthrow of the government.

His five years as president were marked by notable postwar reconstruction, general economic gains, and increased economic aid from the United States. Basic social problems, however, particularly in the rural areas, remained unsolved, and his administration was tainted by widespread graft and corruption.

In 1950, in his second term, the Korean War began and resulted in over 7,450 Filipino soldiers being sent to Korea under the designation of the Philippine Expeditionary Forces to Korea or PEFTOK.

Although ill, Quirino ran for re-election in 1953, but he was overwhelmingly defeated by Ramon Magsaysay.

== Magsaysay administration (1953–1957) ==
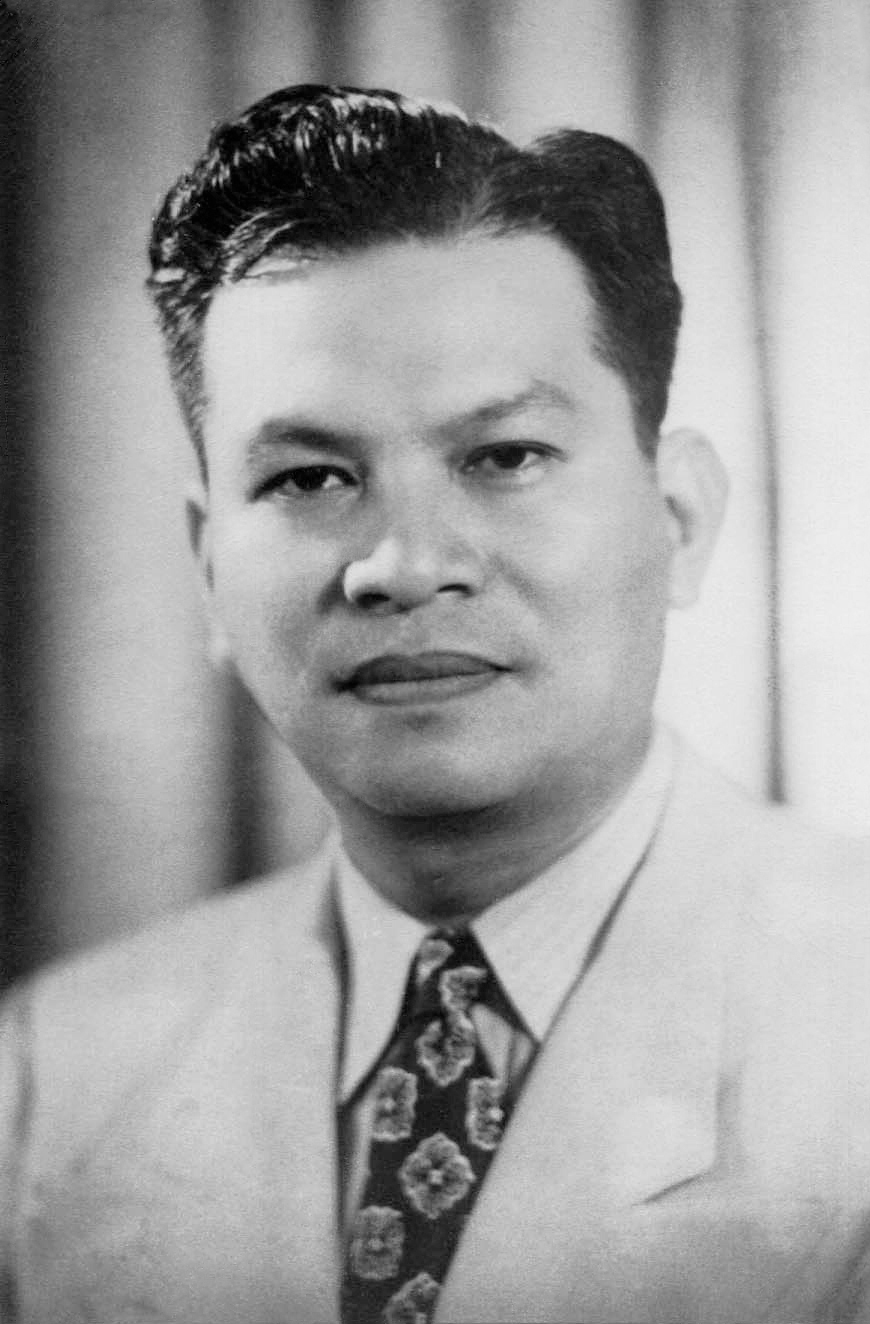
Ramon Magsaysay, president from 1953 to 1957

In the 1953 election, Magsaysay was elected president over the incumbent Elpidio Quirino, with the scarcely concealed help of American officials and funds. He was sworn into office wearing the barong tagalog, a first by a Philippine president.

As president, he was a close friend and supporter of the United States and a vocal spokesman against communism during the Cold War. He led the foundation of the Southeast Asia Treaty Organization also known as the Manila Pact of 1954, that aimed to defeat Marxist–Leninist movements in Southeast Asia, South Asia, and Oceania. During his term, he made Malacañang Palace literally a "house of the people", opening its gates to the public.

One example of his integrity followed a demonstration flight aboard a new plane belonging to the Philippines Air Force (PAF). President Magsaysay asked what the operating costs per hour were for that type of aircraft, then wrote a personal check to the PAF, covering the cost of his flight.

On March 16, 1957, Magsaysay left Manila for Cebu City where he spoke at three educational institutions. That same night, at about 1 a.m., he boarded the presidential plane "Mt. Pinatubo", a C-47, heading back to Manila. In the early morning hours of March 17, his plane was reported missing. It was late in the afternoon that day that newspapers reported that the airplane had crashed on Mount Manunggal in Cebu and that 25 of the 26 passengers and crew aboard were killed. Only newspaperman Nestor Mata survived. Vice President Carlos P. Garcia, who was on an official visit to Australia at the time, assumed the presidency to serve out the last eight months of Magsaysay's term.

An estimated 2 million people attended Magsaysay's burial on March 22, 1957.

== Garcia administration (1957–1961) ==
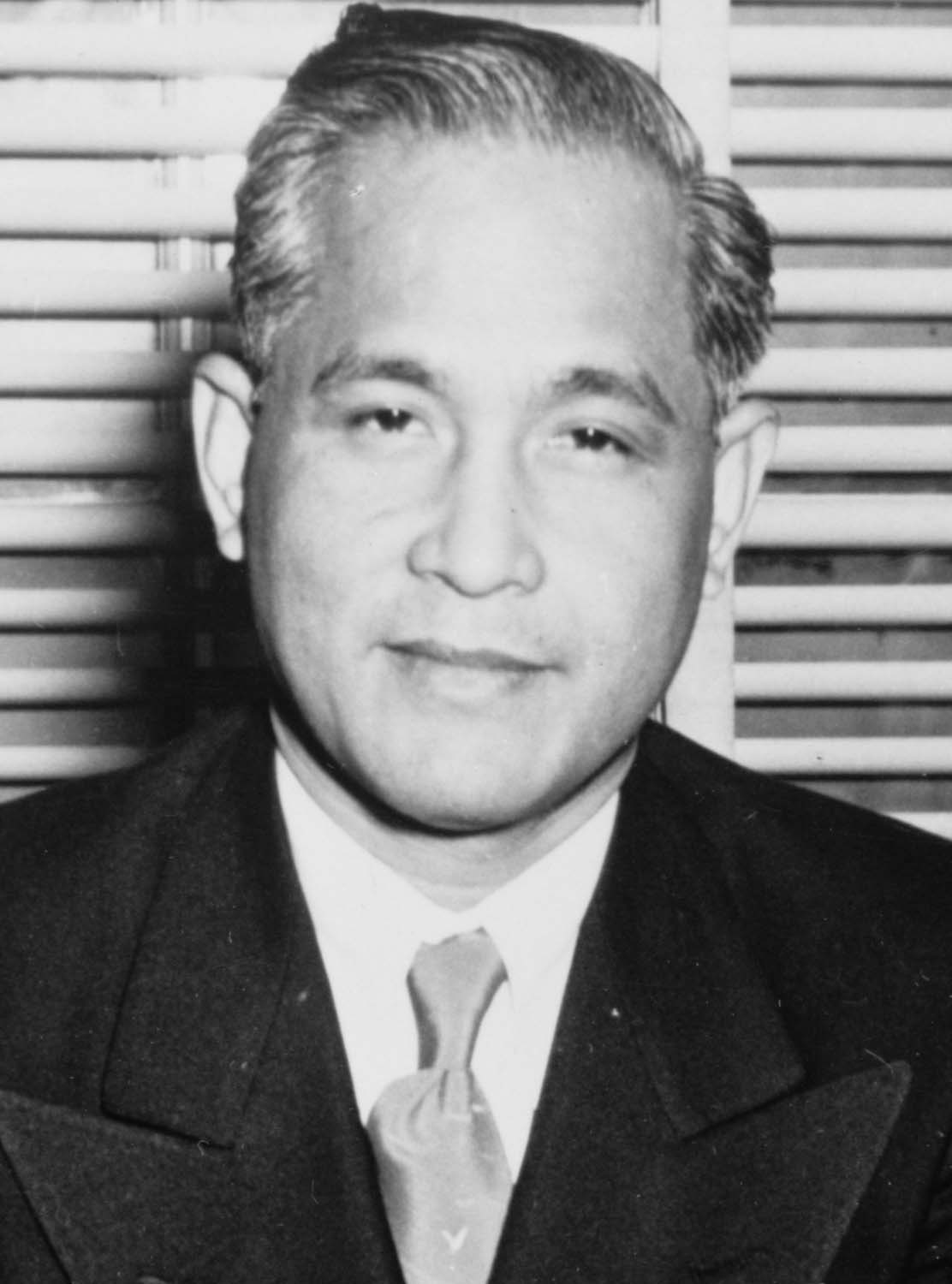
Carlos P. Garcia, president from 1957 to 1961

Garcia assumed the presidency after Ramón Magsaysay died in a plane crash on March 17, 1957, and was elected later the same year, in the Election 1957, to a full term.

During his administration, he acted on the Bohlen–Serrano Agreement which shortened the lease of the US Bases from 99 years to 25 years and made it renewable after every five years.

He was well known when he exercised the Filipino First policy during his term in office. This policy heavily favored Filipino businessmen over foreign investors. He was also responsible for changes in retail trade which greatly affected the Chinese businessmen in the country. He also made a program focused on thriftiness.

At the end of his second term, he ran for re–election in the Election 1961 in November 1961, but was defeated by Diosdado Macapagal, who served as vice-president under him, but belonged to the opposing Liberal Party — in the Philippines the president and the vice-president are elected separately.

== Macapagal administration (1961–1965) ==
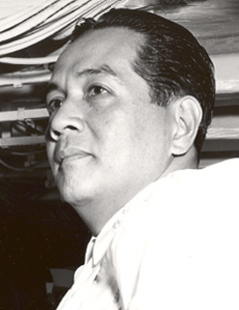
Diosdado Macapagal, president from 1961 to 1965

In the 1961 presidential election, Macapagal ran against Garcia and defeated the incumbent president by a 55% to 45% margin. Seeking to stimulate economic development, Macapagal took the advice of supporters and allowed the Philippine peso to float on the free currency exchange market. His reform efforts were blocked by the Nacionalistas, who dominated the House of Representatives and the Senate at that time. Nonetheless, his presidency achieved growth and prosperity for the nation.

Among the most significant achievements of Macapagal as president were the abolition of tenancy and accompanying land reform program in the Agricultural Land Reform Code of 1963. He also changed the date of celebration of Philippine independence from July 4 to June 12, the latter date having been the day when in 1898, Emilio Aguinaldo declared independence from Spain. Later, Macapagal told author Stanley Karnow that the reason for the change was that American embassy celebrations were visited more than the Filipino reception on the July 4 American independence day.

Macapagal was defeated for re-election in 1965 by Senate President Ferdinand Marcos, a former Liberal Party ally who defected to the Nacionalista Party to challenge the incumbent president.
