= Lahug Airport =

Former airport in Central Visayas, Philippines (1938–1966)

Coordinates: 10°17′35″N 123°54′07″E

Lahug Airport Tugpahanan sa Lahug Paliparan ng Lahug
- IATA: none; ICAO: ~~RPMC~~; WMO: 98645

Summary
- Airport type: Defunct
- Owner: USAFFE (1938–1947); PAAC (1947–1966)
- Operator: Bureau of Aeronautics (currently known as the Civil Aviation Authority of the Philippines (CAAP))
- Serves: Metro Cebu
- Location: Barangays Lahug and Apas, Cebu City, Cebu, Philippines
- Opened: June 25, 1938
- Closed: April 27, 1966
- Time zone: PHT (UTC+08:00)
- Elevation AMSL: 125 ft (38 m)
- Interactive map of Lahug Airport

Runways
Direction	Length		Surface
Direction	ft	m	Surface
	2,297- 2,624	700–800	Asphalt/Concrete (closed)

Lahug Airport ~~(ICAO: RPMC)~~, historically known as Lahug Airfield, was a military airport used by the United States Army Forces in the Far East (USAFFE) and the Philippine Army Air Corps (PAAC). Located before in Cebu City, it was among the two functioning airfields in the Cebu City area, along with the former Opon Airfield.

== History ==
In World War II, Lahug Airport was the site of a battle between the Japanese Army and the American Army, eventually leading to 50 deaths. After the battle, the airport was quickly repaired by the Americans.

On August 12, 1947, the airfield was reclassified as a national airport under the Executive Order No. 75, issued by the former President Manuel Roxas. The purpose of the executive order was to accelerate the development of the civil aviation in the Philippines; it also resulted into the Bureau of Aeronautics taking control of the airport. The Philippine Air Force was allowed to use the airport in times of war and for required daily missions. The airport would later suspend operations by April 27, 1966, after a new airport opened on the island of Mactan.

On February 19, 1981, the first papal mass in Cebu was held at the airport by Pope John Paul II. The mass consisted of one million people. During the event, a statue of the Santo Nino was brought onto the altar. The mass talked about the community Sugbu (now Cebu) was under the patronage of Jesus, he also mentioned the image of the Santo Nino, which was first found in Cebu. The mass also beatified the first Filipino martyr Lorenzo Ruiz. The chair where the pope sat on is currently one of the relics in the Cebu Catholic Museum. The former Lahug Airport is now the site of Cebu IT Park.

== Accidents ==
There were three accidents involving the airport. One of these is when President Ramon Magsaysay was killed in a crash after his aircraft took off from the airport; journalist Nestor Mata was the only person onboard who survived.
