= Jose V. Cruz =

J.V. Cruz
- Born: May 18, 1926; Manila, Philippine Islands
- Died: July 9, 1998 (aged 72)
- Other names: Jose V. Cruz
- Occupation(s): Diplomat, Journalist
- Spouse: Luisa Antonio Cruz
- Children: 7
- Parent: Judge Roman Cruz Amanda Corpuz Cruz

Jose V. Cruz (May 18, 1926 – July 9, 1998), also known as J. V. Cruz was a diplomat and writer from the Philippines. He was the resident Philippine Ambassador to Germany, Egypt, The Netherlands, Iraq, and the United Kingdom (Court of Saint James) from 1970 to 1986.

== Early life and education ==
J.V. Cruz was born to judge (Court of First Instance) Roman Cruz and Amanda Corpuz Cruz, and the eldest of six siblings. In addition, he had two older brothers from the first marriage of his father. He attended Paco High School and went to university at the Ateneo de Manila and was a consistent top of the class student but eventually dropped out from college. He, however, became the youngest ever Press Secretary Cabinet Member in the history of the Philippines at the age of 28 years old.

== Career ==
J.V. Cruz started off in media as a news reporter and had a short-lived role as Press Attache at the Philippine Consulate in San Francisco. He resigned that post to help in the campaign of President Ramon Magsaysay who after winning, appointed him as his Press Secretary. He later on became a regular columnist at the Manila Times in the early 60's until his appointment as Ambassador to the Federal Republic of Germany in 1970 by President Ferdinand Marcos. After resigning from his last diplomatic post, which was to the Court of Saint James in 1986, he returned to column writing for various newspapers until his death in 1998 when he succumbed to colon cancer.

Cruz was a ghost writer for many high government officials, including three presidents of the Philippines. He also hosted a television show called J.V. Cruz Interviews, a public affairs special that won several awards as did his column writing that won him Best Columnist of the Year. He was also top adviser and strategist to several Presidential campaigns.

Cruz was often described as a bon vivant and was praised for his handsome looks as much as he was for his intellect, skillful writing, and political analyses. He was read by leaders and pillars of commerce and industry as well as by national and local politicians.

== Personal life ==
Ambassador J.V. Cruz was married to Luisa Antonio for more than fifty years. She died three years before him of cancer. They had seven children and eight grandchildren.
