= 1957 Cebu Douglas C-47 crash =

Aircraft accident in the Philippines

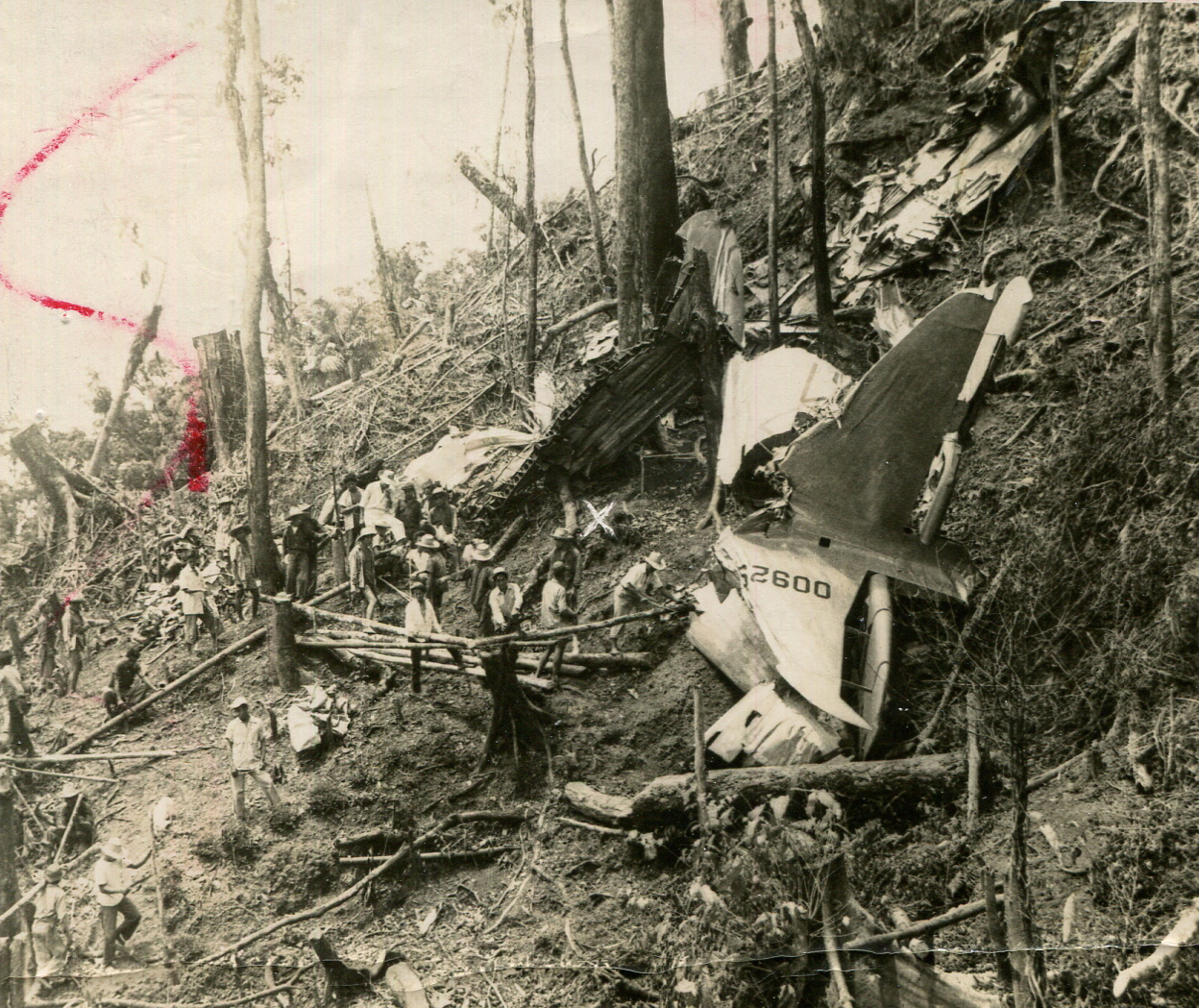
- Wreckage at the crash site on Mount Manunggal, Cebu

Accident
- Date: 17 March 1957
- Summary: Controlled flight into terrain due to pilot error, metal fatigue, and power failure
- Site: Mount Manunggal near Balamban, Cebu, Philippines; 10°27′06″N 123°48′53″E

Aircraft
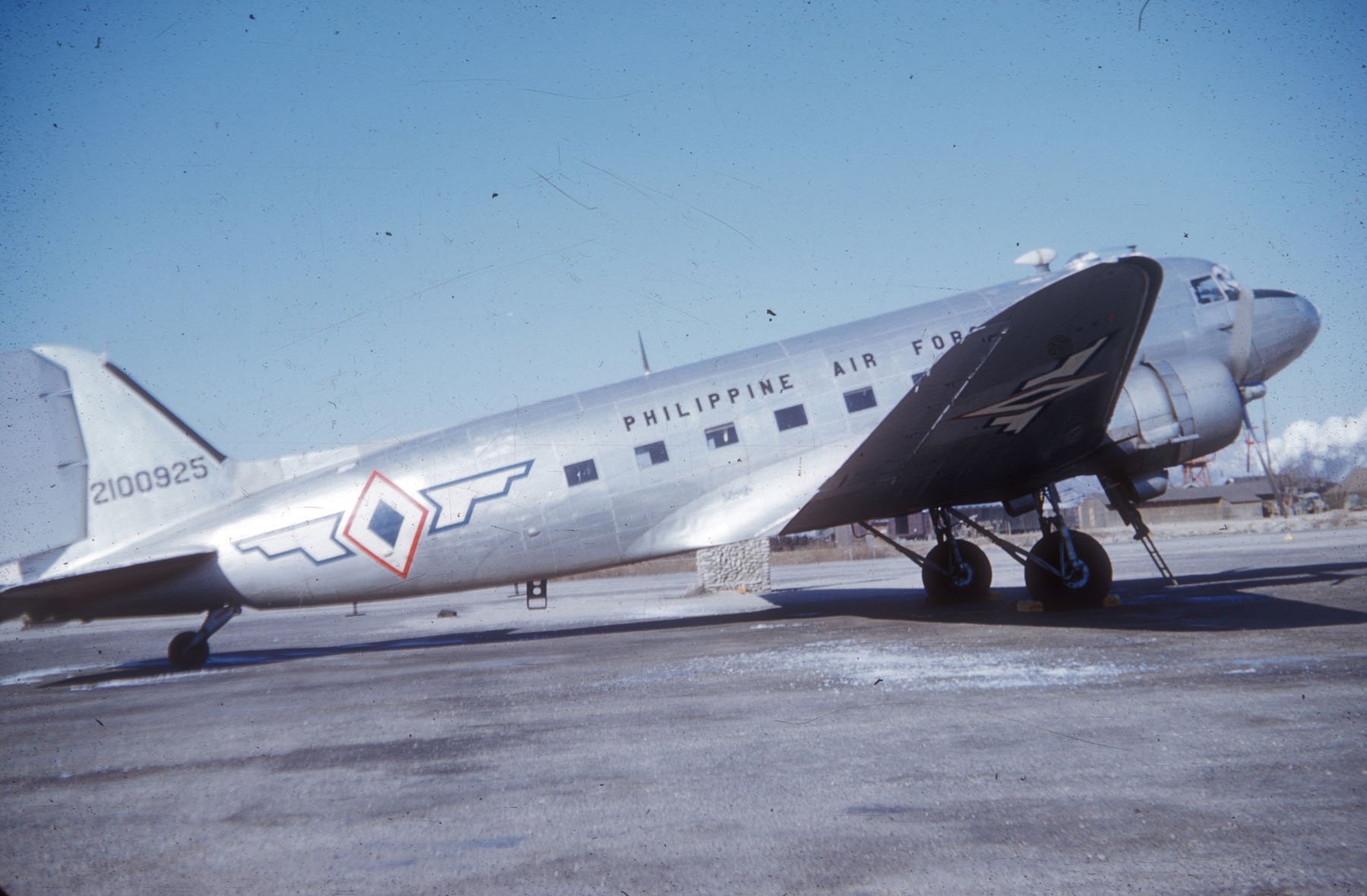
- 2100925, the aircraft involved in the accident
- Aircraft type: Douglas C-47 Skytrain
- Aircraft name: Mt. Pinatubo
- Operator: Philippine Air Force
- Registration: 2100925
- Flight origin: Lahug Airport, Cebu City, Philippines
- Destination: Nichols Field, Pasay, Rizal, Philippines
- Occupants: 26
- Passengers: 21
- Crew: 5
- Fatalities: 25
- Injuries: 1
- Survivors: 1

On March 17, 1957, a Douglas C-47 Skytrain transport aircraft crashed on the slopes of Mount Manunggal on the island of Cebu, Philippines, killing 25 of the aircraft's 26 occupants, including the incumbent president of the Philippines, Ramon Magsaysay. Several high-ranking Philippine government officials, military officials, and journalists were also among the dead. The sole survivor was a reporter for the Philippine Herald, Nestor Mata.

At the time of his death, President Magsaysay, a Nacionalista, was widely popular and was expected to easily win re-election in the presidential elections to be held in November 1957.

== Aircraft and crew ==
The aircraft involved in the crash was a newly reconditioned twin engine C-47A-75-DL Skytrain, which was operated by the Philippine Air Force and served as the official presidential plane of Magsaysay. The plane had been newly purchased with less than 100 hours of logged flight. It had a crew of five, all officers of the Philippine Air Force led by the pilot, Major Florencio Pobre, 37.

The plane was named Mt. Pinatubo, after a long-inactive volcano then best known as the tallest mountain in Magsaysay's home province of Zambales. Mount Pinatubo, which had been dormant since the 14th century, later became active in 1991 and produced the second-largest terrestrial eruption of the 20th century, leaving over 800 people dead.

== Background ==
On March 16, 1957, President Ramon Magsaysay was at Cebu City, where he arrived at 3:45 p.m. PHT aboard his C-47 Mount Pinatubo plane for a series of speaking engagements in the city later that day. He visited former President Sergio Osmeña at his home and later spoke at a convention of USAFFE veterans and the commencement exercises at the University of the Visayas, the Southwestern College and at the University of San Carlos, respectively. At the University of the Visayas, he was conferred an honorary Doctorate of Laws. In the evening, he attended a party at the home of Cebu City mayor Sergio Osmeña Jr. He left for Lahug Airport and boarded his plane shortly before midnight, sent off at the airport by a group led by the mayor's father, former President Sergio Osmeña.

== Accident ==
The aircraft took off from Lahug Airport in Cebu City for Nichols Field near Manila, around 640 kilometers (400 mi) away, at 1:00 a.m. PHT, Sunday, March 17. The weather was fine and the ceiling unlimited with low broken clouds and a bright moon. Eyewitnesses on the ground observed that the airplane had not gained enough altitude as it approached the mountain ranges in Balamban. At 1:17 a.m. PHT, the plane radioed Malacañang, to have the President met at Nichols Field at around 3:15 a.m. This was the last communication from the plane.

Concerns arose after Magsaysay's plane failed to arrive at Nichols Field on schedule. By breakfast time, First Lady Luz Magsaysay and the Magsaysay family were informed that the plane had gone missing. An all-out air and sea search was instituted by the Armed Forces of the Philippines, with the assistance of the United States Air Force and Navy. The search had initially focused on the sea, as much of the flight route was over the ocean. The news had also spread throughout Manila and the rest of the Philippines, people weeping openly upon hearing of the missing flight.

In the mid-afternoon of March 17, a local town official in Cebu announced that the plane had crashed on the slopes of Mount Manunggal, in Balamban, Cebu, approximately 35 kilometres (22 mi) northwest of Cebu City. Several local residents had heard the crash and discovered the flaming wreckage of the plane earlier that morning. They discovered one survivor, Nestor Mata, a reporter with the Philippine Herald newspaper, whom they transported down the mountain. Mata, who suffered second- and third-degree burns, estimated that the plane had crashed around 1:40 a.m. There were no other survivors. Military rescuers arrived at the crash site the following day, March 18. The body of President Magsaysay was identified by his brother Jesus through his wristwatch and later confirmed by dental records. His body was charred and "beyond recognition", according to a report by National Defense Undersecretary Jose Crisol to Press Secretary Jose V. Cruz at 12:35 p.m. It was determined that at the time of the crash, Magsaysay had been inside his special cabin, located just behind the cockpit.

Within hours after the official identification of President Magsaysay's body, Vice President Carlos P. Garcia was sworn in as the 8th President of the Philippines. At the time of the crash, Garcia had been in Australia, attending a conference of the SEATO.

== Passengers ==
In addition to President Magsaysay and Mata, the plane carried 24 others, including former Senator Tomas Cabili, a hero of the guerrilla resistance movement during World War II; Gregorio Hernandez Jr., Secretary of Education; Representative Pedro Lopez of Cebu's 2nd district; and General Benito Ebuen (1912–1957), commanding general of the Philippine Air Force. Also on board was former Olympian Felipe Nunag, then serving as an aide-de-camp to Magsaysay. The other passengers included various civilian and military aides to the President and three journalists.

== Investigation ==
There were initial speculations that sabotage had caused the plane crash. Magsaysay had first come into prominence when as Secretary of Defense during the Quirino administration, he had led the fight against the communist-inspired insurgency of the Hukbalahap movement. However, no evidence emerged to support the theory of sabotage. On April 27, 1957, the chief of the Philippine Constabulary, General Manuel F. Cabal, testified before a Senate committee that the crash had been caused by metal fatigue, which had broken a drive shaft that caused a power failure on board the plane shortly after takeoff. He added that while the plane was gaining altitude, the spindle drive shaft of the right engine carburetor had snapped.

== See also ==
- 2012 Philippines Piper Seneca crash
- List of accidents and incidents involving Philippine Air Force aircraft
- Smolensk air disaster, similar plane crash in Russia
