= Mount Manunggal =

Mountain in the Philippines

- Location within Visayas Location within Philippines

Highest point
- Elevation: 982 m (3,222 ft)
- Coordinates: 10°27′11″N 123°48′54″E

Geography
- Country: Philippines
- Region: Central Visayas
- Province: Cebu
- City/municipality: Balamban

Mount Manunggal is the third-highest peak in the island of Cebu after Osmena Peak and Lugsangan Peak. It is located in Barangay Magsaysay in Balamban, Cebu province, rising 982 m (3,222 ft) above sea level. It is the site of the crash of the presidential plane Mt. Pinatubo that killed President Ramon Magsaysay and 24 others on March 17, 1957.

== History ==
Mount Manunggal is within the Central Cebu Protected Landscape and is protected by Republic Act 9486, otherwise known as the “Central Cebu Protected Landscape Act”; which also covers the Mananga-Kotkot-Lusaran river system, the Sudlon National Park and the watersheds of Buhisan, Mananga and Lusaran.

It is the site of the crash of the presidential plane Mt. Pinatubo which killed President Ramon Magsaysay and 24 others on March 17, 1957. An annual trek is held here to commemorate his death. The site is accessible through many trails but the trail from Tagba-o and at Cantipla in Tabunan, Cebu City is the main route from which the yearly Pres. Ramon Magsaysay Death Anniversary Climb is held.

== Accessibility ==
The trail to Mount Manunggal from the jump-off point at the river that separates Cebu City from Balamban is quite steep and takes between 2 and 7 hours to traverse. The trail to Mount Manunggal from Tagba-o is absent of forest canopies and wildlife, and traverses through many upland farms planted with onions, tomatoes, ginger, garlic, eggplants, cabbage, carrots, etc. It is wide enough to let two persons pass by each other at its narrowest part, and there are no prominent barriers which impede movement.

Water resources abound within the foot of the mountain like rivers, springs and waterfalls.

== Monument ==
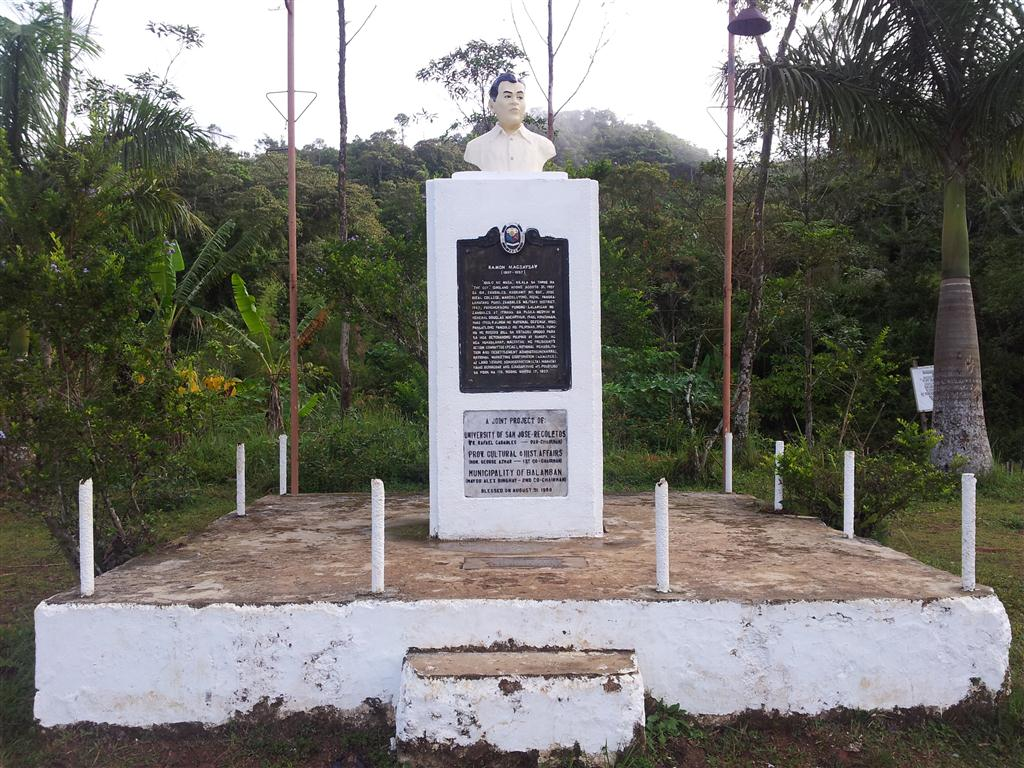
Pres. Ramon Magsaysay monument on Mt. Manunggal

At the campsite, the monument to President Magsaysay and the cylinder block of one of the Pinatubo's engines remind visitors of the historical value of Manunggal in Philippine history. A chapel, erected nearby during the height of a communist insurgency in the 1980s, guides the local inhabitants' spiritual yearning.

On April 24, 2012, the crash site was declared a National Historical Landmark by the National Historical Commission of the Philippines.
