= Nestor Mata =

Filipino journalist (1926 – 2018)

- Nestor Mata
- Born: January 16, 1926; Insular Government of the Philippine Islands, U.S.
- Died: April 12, 2018 (aged 92); San Juan, Metro Manila, Philippines
- Education: University of Santo Tomas
- Occupations: journalist; professor
- Children: 6

Nestor Mata (January 16, 1926 – April 12, 2018) was a Filipino journalist whose writing career spanned six decades. He was also known as the only survivor of the 1957 plane crash that killed President Ramon Magsaysay, and 25 others.

== Education ==
Nestor Mata graduated from the University of Santo Tomas where he obtained a degree in philosophy and letter. He has also had masteral studies on foreign affairs.

== Journalist career ==
=== Early years ===
Mata worked with a government radio station before becoming a reporter with the Philippine Herald newspaper and covered the Korean War as a war correspondent. He covered topics which involved politics and foreign affairs. In 1953, he was assigned by his newspaper to cover the then-newly elected President Magsaysay.

=== Surviving the 1957 Cebu Douglas C-47 crash ===
On March 16, 1957, President Magsaysay, accompanied by several government officials and journalists, flew to Cebu for a speaking engagement. Later that evening, the presidential party took off for the return flight to Manila. Their plane crashed in Mount Manung-gal in Cebu at around 1:16 a.m, March 17, 1957.

Mata had been seated near the presidential compartment and was half-asleep at the time of the crash. He was initially rendered unconscious after the crash, and came to a few hours later. Mata later recounted:

I found myself on the side of a steep cliff among dried bushes…. Agonizing with pain, I was completely at a loss what to do. About three meters away from me were parts of the plane. They were still burning. Meanwhile, I heard the distant howling of a dog. It was only then that I felt hopeful of being rescued. Thinking that there were probably people living not far away from where I lay moaning with pain, I made an effort to shout. I noticed that my voice echoed in the nearby mountains.

After that, I began shouting, "Mr. President! Mr. President! Mr. President!" When no answer came, I shouted for Pablo Bautista, the reporter of the Liwayway magazine. "Pabling! Pabling!" Still no answer. It began to dawn on me that there was no other survivor except me.

Mata was rescued by Marcelino Nuya and several other farmers residing near the crash site. He suffered second and third degree burns all over his body and would be hospitalized for the next six months. It took eighteen hours to transport the injured Mata down the mountain. Upon his arrival at a Cebu City hospital, Mata was able to dictate through a nurse a press dispatch to his newspaper. It began with the sentence "President Magsaysay is dead."

Together with Vicente Villafranca, Mata penned One Came Back (1957), a memoir detailing the last moments of President Magsaysay and his own ordeal after surviving the plane crash.

=== Post-crash career ===
After surviving the crash, Mata continued writing for the Philippine Herald until it was closed down in 1972 following the declaration of Martial Law by then-President Ferdinand Marcos. He then served with The Daily Express until Marcos' ouster during the People Power Revolution of 1986.

From 1986 to 1999, Mata penned as a regular newspaper column for the Manila Standard and from 1999 until his death wrote for the Malaya. He also acted as a co-executive editor for the magazine Lifestyle Asia from 1986 to 1999.

== Career outside journalism ==
Mata worked as an associate professor who taught subjects on politics such as the creation of the Association of Southeast Asian Nations and talks on resolving the North Borneo dispute. He taught until 1972.

He was also involved in chess having won executive chess events in the 1970s. He also became a board member of the now-defunct Philippine Chess Federation and led the Philippine delegation to the Chess Olympiad in 1994 in Moscow, Russia.

== Death ==
Mata died on April 12, 2018, at the Cardinal Santos Memorial Hospital in San Juan, Metro Manila.

== Personal life ==
Mata had six children.

== See also ==
- List of aviation accidents and incidents with a sole survivor
