= List of people from Negros Occidental =

Below is a list of notable people who were either born in, lived in, are current residents of, or have a parent who was born or raised in the province of Negros Occidental, Philippines (including from the highly urbanized city of Bacolod)

== Arts, Culture, and Media Personalities ==
=== Broadway and West End Theater ===
- Lydia Gaston - Broadway theatre and Hollywood actress, known for starring as Susan Valencia in the 2022 film Easter Sunday
- Cocoy Laurel - Singer, Theater and film actor, part of the London and Australia cast of Miss Saigon

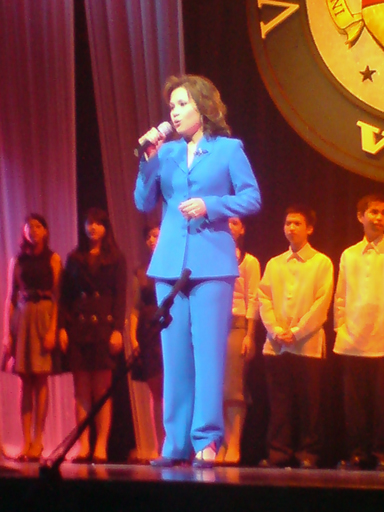
Lea Salonga

- Lea Salonga -Theater and Film Actress, Singer, 1st Asian Actress to win a Tony Award, Laurence Olivier Award winner, two time Grammy Award nominee, Disney legend
- Eduardo Varela Sicangco — scenic designer costume designer and illustrator for Broadway theater, New York City Opera, Houston Grand Opera, Virginia Opera, television and film, he was part of the art department for The Forbidden Kingdom which starred Jackie Chan, Jet Li and Michael Angarano

=== Dance ===
- Maniya Barredo - Ballet Dancer, Prima Ballerina of the Philippines
- Georgette Sanchez - Ballet Dancer for Abcdance company in St. Potten, Austria

=== Fashion ===
- Sandra Seifert - International fashion model, Philippine representative to Elite Model Look, 1st runner up Miss Earth 2009
- Rafe Totengco - New York based bags and accessories designer, guest judge at Project Runway All Stars season 2 and Project Runway Philippines season 1, The Outstanding Young Men of the Philippines 2002 awardee

=== Film and Television ===
- Carla Abellana - Film and television actress
- Rey "PJ" Abellana — film and TV actor
- Migo Adecer - Television Actor ,StarStruck season 6 Ultimate male survivor
- Jai Agpangan - Film and television actress, comedian, Youtuber, 4th big placer Pinoy Big Brother: Teen Edition 4
- Joj Agpangan - Film and television actress, comedian, Youtuber, 4th big placer Pinoy Big Brother: Teen Edition 4
- Saicy Aguila - dancer, Television and film actress, Pinoy Big Brother: Season 2 housemate
- Christian Bables - film and television actor
- Analyn Barro - Television actress, StarStruck season 6 Hopeful
- Ethan Benares - Pinoy Big Brother: Collab 3.0 Housemate
- Bernard Bonnin — film and TV actor
- J.C. Bonnin - film and tv actor
- Elijah Canlas - Award Winning Actor on Film and Television
- Sheryl Cruz — Actress on film and television
- Tisha Custodio - Television actress in the United States, best known for playing Carolyn Smith in the Disney+ series Big Shot starring John Stamos
- Assunta De Rossi - Film and television actress, wife of Negros Occidental’s 1st congressional district representative Jules Ledesma
- Monsour del Rosario - TV and film actor, Taekwondo champion, Member of the House of Representatives of the Philippines
- Rio Diaz — former beauty queen, TV host and actress
- Chuckie Dreyfus — Actor on film and television
- Kyle Echarri - Film and television actor, singer
- Rollo Espinos - Model, television actor, StarStruck season 5 Hopeful, Pinoy Boyband Superstar contestant
- Peque Gallaga — multi-awarded filmmaker, screenwriter and actor
- Dwight Gaston - Actor,Writer, Costume designer, member of the Art department for the 1986 Hollywood fim Platoon, by Oliver Stone, notable for playing Kuya Dwight in the long running children’s television show Batibot
- Charles Gemora — Hollywood makeup-artist, special effects pioneer and actor
- Joya Genzola - Pinoy Big Brother: Unlimited housemate
- Charlene Gonzales — Television and film personality and former beauty queen
- Anthony Jennings — Film and TV star
- Odette Khan - Film and television actress , Gawad Urian award winner for best actress
- Vangie Labalan - Film and television actress
- Ronnie Lazaro — a Gawad Urian Award-winning Filipino film and television actor, producer and casting and art director
- Roger Lucero - Pinoy Big Brother: 737 - Part 2 3rd big placer
- Pancho Magalona — award-winning film actor
- Elvira Manahan - television host, actress and socialite
- Johnny Manahan - Film and television director, actor, talent manager, Vice President and managing director of Star Magic, Senior Vice President of ABS-CBN Corporation, Consultant for Sparkle GMA Artist Center
- Erik Matti — director, screenwriter, producer
- Chanel Morales - Film and television actress, Artista Academy Final 6 student
- Angel Locsin — Actress in film and television
- Romy Pastrana — comedian and Goin' Bulilit member under the name Dagul.
- AJ Perez — Film and television actor
- Allan K. — singer, comedian, actor and TV host
- Sue Ramirez - Film and TV actress
- Elizabeth Ramsey — comedian, singer and actress
- Ana Roces - Film and television actress
- Susan Roces — award-winning actress, nicknamed Queen of Philippine Movies, widow of Fernando Poe Jr., adoptive mother of Grace Poe
- Brx Ruiz - Pinoy Big Brother: Gen 11 Housemate
- Vickie Rushton - Film and Television actress, beauty queen, Mutya ng Pilipinas International 2011, Pinoy Big Brother: All In 4th big placer
- Rosemarie Sonora — actress
- Joel Torre — actor, director and film producer

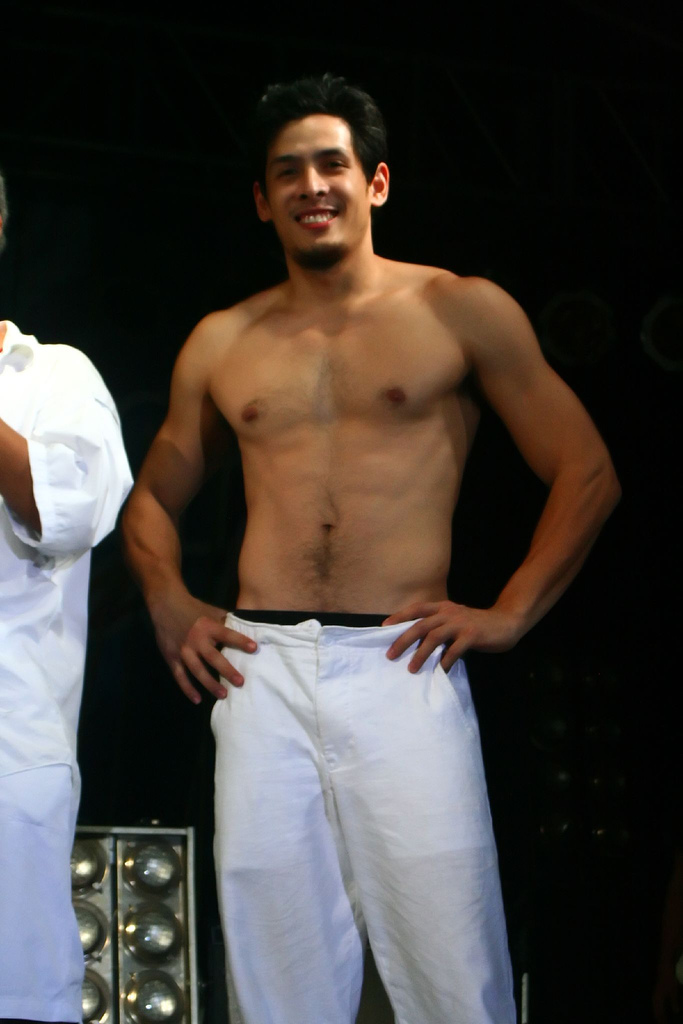
Christian Vasquez

- Christian Vasquez — Film and television actor, model, housemate of ABS-CBN's Pinoy Big Brother: Pinoy Big Brother: Celebrity Edition
- Maggie Wilson - Film and Television actress, winner of the fifth season of The Amazing Race Asia, TV host, Binibining Pilipinas World 2007

=== Journalism ===
- Alvin Elchico — Broadcast Journalist, TV/radio host
- Jose Jaime Espina - Journalist, co-founder of the National Union of Journalists of the Philippines
- Arsenio Lacson - Broadcast journalist, radio show host, newspaper columnist, 1st elected Mayor of Manila, Member of the House of Representatives of the Philippines, member of the Philippine national football team
- Raul Locsin — editor, publisher and founder of BusinessWorld Ramon Magsaysay Award recipient
- Teodoro Locsin Jr. - TV host, radio news anchor, Editor and Publisher of Today Newspaper, Executive director of the Philippines Free Press, Press Secretary, Member of the Philippine House of Representatives, 20th Permanent Representative of the Philippines to the United Nations 27th Secretary of Foreign Affairs
- Teodoro Locsín Sr. — Editor of the Philippines Free Press, Co-founder of the Free Philippines newspaper
- TJ Manotoc - Sports television personality, Sports commentator, Sports journalist, ABS-CBN North America bureau chief, 1st cousin, once removed of Eugenio Lopez III, the former CEO and Chairman of ABS-CBN Corporation
- Johnny Midnight - radio and television broadcast journalist
- Pablo Torre - Pulitzer Prize winning journalist, sportswriter, podcaster, and television host in the United States of America

=== Literature ===
- Adelina Gurrea — journalist, poet and playwright in Spanish
- Doreen Fernandez - writer, food columnist, cultural historian
- Elsa Martinez Coscolluela — award-winning poet, short-story writer, and playwright
- Gilbert Luis R. Centina III — prize-winning poet and author
- Luis T. Centina Jr. - author, guerrilla leader in the United States Army Forces in the Far East
- Alex Lacson — writer, lawyer and philanthropist

=== Music ===
- Valfer Javellana Alo - singer, rapper, former member of boyband Alamat
- Carlos Balcells - Bass guitarist for rock band The Dawn
- Noven Belleza — It's Showtime Tawag ng Tanghalan grand winner
- Jose Mari Chan - Singer and songwriter, has the no.1 and no. 2 best-selling albums in the Philippines
- Bobby Enriquez — jazz pianist in the United States
- Conchita Gaston - International Mezzo Soprano and Opera singer
- Jaya — Soul Diva and Asia's Queen of Soul

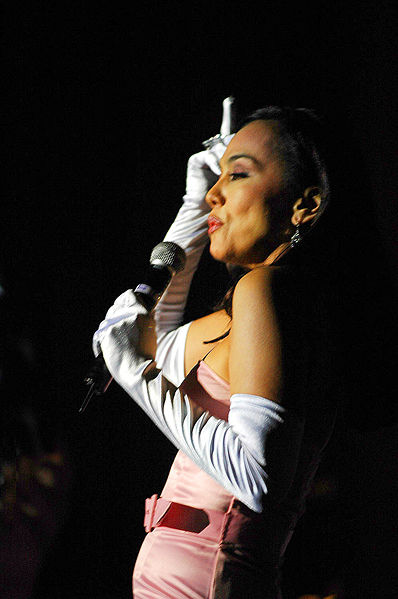
Kuh Ledesma

- Kuh Ledesma — Singer, Actress, one of the first filipino pop artists to perform a concert at Carnegie Hall, Her U.S. debut album, Precious reached the Top 20 of the U.S. Billboard Jazz Charts, Appeared in the 1982 film The Year of Living Dangerously with Mel Gibson and Sigourney Weaver, she was married to Luis Quirino Gonzales, grandson of Elpidio Quirino, the sixth President of the Philippines
- Francis Magalona — Former actor, TV host, master rapper and also VJ on Channel V Philippines and MTV Philippines
- Diomedes Maturan - Singer, Tawag ng Tanghalan Grand Champion
- Kim Ng - member of South Korea based boy band Hori7on
- Ella May Saison - Singer, songwriter , dubbed the original Philippine Queen of Soul
- Gerard Salonga - conductor, composer, and arranger for classical music, film, television and popular music, Assistant conductor Hong Kong Philharmonic Orchestra, Resident conductor for the Malaysian Philharmonic Orchestra

=== National Artists of the Philippines ===
- Larry Alcala - National Artist of the Philippines for Visual Arts, Cartoonist and Illustrator known for his cartoons; Slice of Life, Mang Ambo, and Kalabog en Bosyo
- Nunelucio Alvarado - National Artist of the Philippines for Visual Arts, Painter
- Teodoro Hilado - National Artist of the Philippines for theater, Father of Lighting design in Philippine theater, lighting technician, theater director
- Agnes Locsin - National Artist of the Philippines for dance, choreographer
- Leandro Locsin - National Artist of the Philippines for Architecture, Architect of the Cultural Center of the Philippines, the Philippine International Convention Center and Istana Nurul Iman the official residence of the Sultan of Brunei and the seat of power of the government of Brunei

=== Visual arts ===
- Alfredo Alcala — comic book artist for DC Comics and Marvel Comics, Inkpot Award winner, an honor bestowed annually by Comic-con International, Inkwell Awards winner
- John Becaro - illustrator and visual artist
- Alfonso A. Ossorio — abstract expressionist artist, many of his art is held in the permanent collections of major institutions like the Museum of Modern Art, and the Whitney Museum of American Art, both of which are in New York City, and the Smithsonian American Art Museum in Washington DC. His most famous work, the Angry Christ Mural is a midcentury modern and cultural landmark in the Philippines and has been featured in international publications Life Magazine and National Geographic

== Athletes ==
=== Basketball ===
- Harold Alarcon - College basketball player
- Manuel Araneta Jr. - member of the Philippine men’s national basketball team that competed in the 1948 Summer Olympics, father of the First Lady of the Philippines Liza Araneta Marcos wife of Bongbong Marcos the 17th President of the Philippines
- Francis Arnaiz — Former basketball player in the Philippine Basketball Association for Toyota Super Corollas and Barangay Ginebra Kings
- Nonoy Baclao — Professional basketball player who plays for the Talk 'N Text Tropang Texters in the Philippine Basketball Association. He also played for the Philippine Patriots in the ASEAN Basketball League and as a collegiate player for the Ateneo Blue Eagles in the UAAP
- SJ Belangel - Professional Basketball player
- Jeffrei Chan — Professional basketball player who plays for the Rain or Shine Elasto Painters in the Philippine Basketball Association and member of Gilas Pilipinas in the 2014 FIBA World Cup
- Miguel Corteza - Professional basketball player
- Rudy Distrito — Retired Professional Basketball player in the Philippine Basketball Association
- Boyet Fernandez — Current head coach of the NLEX Road Warriors in the PBA D-League and San Beda Red Lions in the NCAA. Former head coach of the now defunct Sta. Lucia Realtors in the PBA and UP Fighting Maroons in the UAAP
- Reynel Hugnatan — Professional basketball player who plays for the Meralco Bolts in the Philippine Basketball Association
- Noli Locsin — Retired basketball player who spent most of his career for the Ginebra San Miguel franchise in the Philippine Basketball Association
- Jeff Manday - Professional basketball player
- Kib Montalbo - Professional basketball player, SEA Games silver medalist
- LA Revilla — Professional basketball player for Mahindra Enforcer in the Philippine Basketball Association
- Raul Soyud - Professional basketball player
- Martin Urra - Asian Games Gold Medalist for Men's Basketball, Member of the Philippine Men's National Basketball team that competed in the 1956 Summer Olympics
- Byron Villarias - Professional basketball player
- James Yap — Professional basketball player who plays for the San Mig Super Coffee Mixers in the Philippine Basketball Association and a former member of the Philippines national basketball team
- Mark Yee — Professional basketball player who plays for the GlobalPort Batang Pier in the Philippine Basketball Association

=== Bowls ===
- Sonia Bruce — International lawn bowler, bronze medalist at the 2016 World Bowls Championship
- Ainie Knight — International lawn and indoor bowler, bronze medalist at the 2012 World Bowls Championship

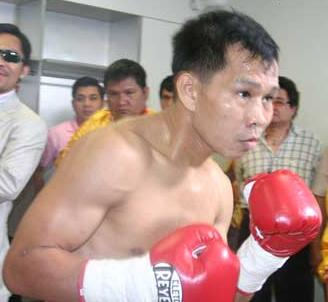
Gerry Peñalosa

=== Boxing ===
==== Olympic Medalist ====
- Mansueto Velasco, Jr. — 1996 Summer Olympic Games Silver Medalist, with this feat he and his brother Roel are the 1st and only set of siblings to win Olympic medals for the Philippines
- Roel Velasco — 1992 Summer Olympics Bronze Medalist, 1st Olympic medalist from the Visayas

==== World Champion ====
- Rolando Bohol — Former IBF world flyweight champion
- Francisco Guilledo — More commonly known as Pancho Villa, First Filipino World Champion boxer, World flyweight champion and IBHOF International Boxing Hall of Fame and WBHOF World Boxing Hall of Fame Inductee
- Small Montana (Benjamin Gan) — Won the Flyweight Championship of the World (as recognized by New York state)
- Eleuterio Zapanta — World bantamweight champion in 1940 and World flyweight champion in 1941
- Dodie Boy Peñalosa — Two Division World Champion and former IBF champion in the light flyweight and flyweight classes
- Gerry Peñalosa — Two Division World Champion and former holder of the WBC super flyweight and the WBO bantamweight titles
- Sonny Boy Jaro — The Ring and WBC Flyweight World Champion
- Eric Jamili — Retired professional boxer and WBO minimumweight Champion.

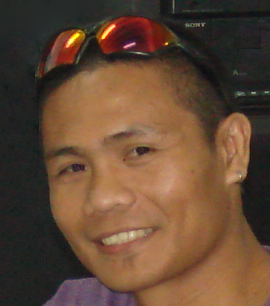
Donnie Nietes

- Donnie Nietes — Four Division World Champion and former WBO Minimumweight World Champion, former WBO & The Ring Light Flyweight Champion and former IBF Flyweight Champion
- Merlito Sabillo — WBO Minimumweight world title champion
- Ryan Sermona - World Boxing Council Super featherweight champion
- Ben Villaflor — WBA world junior lightweight (now called super featherweight) champion during the 1970s
- Arthur Villanueva - World Boxing Council Super Flyweight champion, International Boxing Federation Super Flyweight champion, World Boxing Organization Super Flyweight champion

==== Other Notable Boxers ====
- Ian Clark Bautista - three times SEA Games Gold medalist
- Leopoldo Cantancio — Retired boxer who competed at two Summer Olympic Games. He also won a bronze medal in the 1990 Asian Games
- Godfrey Castro — 2007 SEA Games silver medalist and 2006 Asian Games bronze medalist (flyweight)
- Toto Landero - Professional boxer
- Mark Jason Melligen — Professional boxer
- Aston Palicte - Professional boxer
- Elias Recaido — Competed in the 1996 Summer Olympics. He won a bronze medal at the 1990 Asian Games
- Genesis Servania — Professional Boxer
- Joan Tipon — 2006 Doha Asian Games gold medalist (bantamweight)
- Young Tommy — professional boxer
- Rogen Ladon — Competed at the 2016 Summer Olympics in the Men's light flyweight division
- Oscar de Larrazabal - Competed at the 1936 Summer Olympics for the men’s boxing bantamweight division
- Isidro Vicera - Competed at the 1992 Summer Olympics for the men’s boxing flyweight event

=== Chess ===
- Rogelio Barcenilla - Chess Grandmaster, aside from World Champion is the highest title a chess player can attain
- Alekhine Nouri — Chess Champion, became the youngest FIDE Master in the world at age 7

=== Football ===
- Manuel Amechazurra — The first Filipino footballer to play in the European football circuit, he was called El Capitán and played as a defender, from 1905 to 1915 for FC Barcelona
- Florentino Broce — Former member and coach for the Philippines national football team
- Robert Cañedo — Professional footballer for JPV Marikina in the Philippines Football League and former member of the Philippines national football team
- Alesa Dolino - Defender for the Philippines women's national football team. She also plays for OutKast F.C. in the PFF Women's League
- Dave Fegidero — Former member of the Philippines national football team
- Norman Fegidero — Former member and coach for the Philippines national football team
- Troy Fegidero - Former member of the Philippines national football team
- Ali Go — Former member of the Philippines national football team and the Philippines national futsal team
- Arsenio Lacson - Former member of the Philippines national football team and participated in tournaments such as the 1934 Far Eastern Championship Games
- Tating Pasilan — Former member of the Philippines national football team and the Philippines national futsal team. He also played for the Green Archers United in the defunct United Football League
- Eduard Sacapaño — Professional footballer who plays as a goalkeeper for Ceres-Negros F.C. in the Philippines Football League and a former member of the Philippines national football team
- Camelo Tacusalme - Professional footballer who plays as a defender for JPV Marikina in the Philippines Football League
- Joshua Beloya — Professional football player who plays as a striker for Ilocos United in the Philippines Football League. Former member of the Philippines national U-23 football team and the Philippines national beach soccer team
- Joel Villarino - member of the Philippines national football team, football coach

=== Gymnastics ===
- Christopher Remkes - Commonwealth Games gold medalist, Artistic Gymnastics World Cup two times gold medalist

=== Golf ===
- Juvic Pagunsan —professional golfer, Asian Tour Order of Merit champion

=== Martial arts ===
- Carlos Baylon Jr. - wushu athlete, Sanda World Cup gold medalist, World Wushu Championships silver medalist, 2023 SEA Games bronze medalist
- Monsour del Rosario — taekwondo champion who has also starred in several Filipino and international action films. He won bronze in the 1985 World Taekwondo Championships
- Ernesto Presas — martial artist, founder of Filipino martial arts system Kombatan
- Remy Presas — Father of Modern Arnis
- Remy P. Presas — arnisador, martial artist

=== Pool ===
- Ramil Gallego — professional pool player

=== Softball ===
- Queeny Sabobo — softball player, gold medalist at the 2015 Southeast Asian Games

=== Swimming ===
- Carlo Piccio — Olympic swimmer

=== Tennis ===
- Alexandra Eala - Ranked World no. 15 in the Women’s Tennis Association, making her the highest ranking female tennis player from southeast asia through history, 2022 US Open (tennis) Junior Women’s Singles Champion

=== Volleyball ===
- Fille Cayetano — Volleyball player for both the Meralco Power Spikers of the Shakey's V-League (SVL) and the Petron Blaze Spikers of the Philippine Super Liga
- Geneveve Casugod - Professional volleyball player at the Premier Volleyball League
- Melissa Gohing - Team captain and libero of the Pocari Sweat Lady Warriors in the Premier Volleyball League
- Leo Ordiales - Volleyball player, member of the Philippines men’s national volleyball team
- Bernadeth Pons - Professional volleyball player at the Premier Volleyball League
- Jonah Sabete - Professional volleyball player at the Premier Volleyball League

== Beauty Pageant Titleholders ==
=== Big Three International Beauty Pageant Title Holders ===
- Aurora Pijuan — Miss International 1970

=== Minor International Beauty Pageant Titile Holders ===
- Mimilannie Lisondra - Miss University International 2001, Mutya ng Pilipinas Tourism Queen of the Year International 2001

=== Major International Beauty Pageant Top placers and Candidates ===
==== Miss Universe ====
- Charlene Gonzales - Top 6 Miss Universe 1994, Actress
- Jewel Mae Lobaton - Miss Universe Philippines 1998

==== Miss World ====
- Gwendolyne Fourniol — Miss World Philippines 2022
- Margaret Nales Wilson — Miss World Philippines 2007, TV personality and actress

==== Miss International ====
- Margaret Rose Montinola - Top 15 Miss International 1969

==== Miss Earth ====
- Sandra Seifert — 1st Runner up Miss Earth 2009, Miss Philippines Earth 2009, International Fashion Model

=== Minor Beauty Pageants Top placers and Candidates ===
==== Miss Asia ====
- Rio Diaz - Mutya ng Pilipinas 1977, 4th runner up Miss Asia Pageant, TV host, film actress, former Vice Mayor of Pontevedra, Negros Occidental

=== National Beauty Pageant Titleholders ===
==== Mutya ng Pilipinas ====
- Vickie Rushton — Lin-ay sang Negros 2009, Mutya ng Pilipinas 2011, Pinoy Big Brother: All In Housemate

==== Miss Philippines Centennial ====
- Carmela Arcolas - Miss Philippines Centennial 1998

==== Miss Earth ====
- Grezilda Adelantar - Miss Philippines Eco Tourism 2009
- Joy Marin - Miss Philippines Water 2015

==== Manila Carnival ====
- Adelaide Coscoluella - Miss Mindanao 1937 at the Manila Carnival
- Sonia Ortaliz Gamboa - Miss Visayas 1937 at the Manila Carnival
- Mercedes Montilla - Miss Philippines 1936 at the Manila Carnival, former Mayor of Sipalay

=== Male Beauty Pageants ===
- Jhon Miles Piodena- Great Man of the Universe Philippines 2024
- Josua Salibio- 1st titleholder of Mister Philippine Islands Cosmo

== Business Tycoons ==
- J. Amado Araneta - Businessman, Owner and builder of the Araneta Coliseum and Araneta City
- Jorge L. Araneta - Chairman and CEO of The Araneta Group, ranked as the 47th richest person in the Philippines by Forbes Magazine on 2021 with a net worth of $215 million
- Roberto Benedicto - Chairman of the Philippine National Bank, Sugar Czar, Media Tycoon, he owned the largest media companies in the Philippines at one point which includes the Philippines Daily Express Newspaper, TV and Radio Networks, Radio Philippines Network (RPN), Banahaw Broadcasting Corporation (BBC) and Intercontinental Broadcasting Corporation (IBC). In 1983 it was estimated that he had a net worth of $800 million or $2.5 billion equivalent amount in 2025
- Albee Benitez - Chairman and CEO of Brightlight Productions a television film and production company, Member of the House of Representatives of the Philippines, 43rd Mayor of Bacolod
- Danding Cojuangco - Chairman and CEO of San Miguel Corporation, In 2016 his personal wealth was estimated at $1.16 billion USD, he left most of this to his widow, Soledad Montilla-Oppen Cojuangco who was born and raised in Negros Occidental, she and their family were ranked as the 17th richest person in the Philippines by Forbes Magazine on 2025 with a net worth of $1.15 billion USD
- Esteban de la Rama - founder of the Panay Electric Company, owner of De La Rama Steamship Company, Inc., Senator of the Philippines
- Oscar Hilado - Chairman of Phinma, ranked as the 33rd richest person in the Philippines by Forbes Magazine on 2007
- Alfredo Montelibano Sr - Chairman of ABS-CBN Corporation, Chairman of Meralco, Military Governor of Negros and Siquijor, Secretary of National Defense and the Interior
- Tan Yu - Business Tycoon, In 1997 Forbes listed him as the 7th wealthiest person in the world, and the wealthiest person in the Philippines with a net worth of $7 billion USD or $14 billion equivalent in 2025
- Ricardo Y. Yanson - Founder of Vallacar Transit the largest bus company in the Philippines and Southeast asia, bus liners under Vallacar include, Ceres Liner, Ceres Tours, Ceres Transport, Mindanao Star, Bachelor Express, Rural Transit, Bachelor Tours and Rural Tours
- Jose Yulo - Owner of the Canlubang Sugar Estate, at one point one of the largest haciendas in the Philippines at 7,100 hectares (18,000 acres), today it has been developed into Nuvali, a planned community and Canlubang Golf & Country Club, 2nd Speaker of the National Assembly of the Philippines, 6th Chief Justice of the Philippines, 13th and 34th Secretary of Justice of the Philippines, Senator of the Philippines

== Chefs and Food Entrepreneurs ==
- JP Anglo - Celebrity Chef, Youtuber, Judge for Masterchef Pinoy Edition and Junior MasterChef Pinoy Edition, His restaurant Sarsa which specializes in Negrense cuisine including Bacolod Chicken Inasal was selected for the Bib Gourmand category of the Philippines’ inaugural edition of the Michelin Guide
- Paolo and Josephine Bernabe - Married couple who are the founders and owners of Bacolod Chicken BBQ, a Bacolod chicken inasal restaurant chain, founded in 1976 with branches in the Philippines and international branches in, the United Arab Emirates, Qatar, Kuwait and Oman
- Joe Cajili - Founder of Chicken House, a Bacolod chicken inasal restaurant chain founded in 1976, with branches across Negros Occidental and Metro Manila
- Lourdes Ciocon - Founder and Owner of L’Fisher hotel in Bacolod, and Chicken Deli a Bacolod chicken inasal restaurant chain founded in 1983 with 17 branches in the Visayas and Luzon
- Tony Boy Escalante - Chef, owner of Antonio’s restaurant which was selected in the Philippines’ inaugural edition of the Michelin Guide
- Amado Fores - Owner and founder of Steak and Frice which was selected in the Philippines’ inaugural edition of the Michelin Guide
- Margarita Fores - Celebrity Chef, restaurant chain owner, Asia's Best Female Chef 2016, her restaurant Lusso was selected in the Philippines’ inaugural edition of the Michelin Guide
- Ricky Montelibano - Co-founder of Potato Corner, a food franchise known for its french fries with more than 2,300 branches in 15 countries and territories as of 2025
- Rose, Bing, and JM Tanalgo - siblings who founded Bacolod Chicken Inasal in 1993, a Bacolod chicken inasal restaurant with 20 branches across Metro Manila and surrounding provinces
- Toto Tarrosa - Owner of Aida’s Manokan, a Bacolod Chicken Inasal restaurant founded in the 1970s in Bacolod and opened a branch in Makati, which was selected in the Philippines’ inaugural edition of the Michelin Guide
- Joel Torre - Actor, Owner and founder of JT’s Manukan Grille a Bacolod chicken inasal restaurant chain with more than 40 branches across the Philippines, and international branches in Singapore, and Dubai
- George Wieneke - Co-founder of Potato Corner, a food franchise known for its french fries with more than 2,300 branches in 15 countries and territories as of 2025, Founder of Tokyo Tempura, a food franchise that specializes in Tempura with over 100 stores nationwide

== Educators and Scientists ==
=== International Scientists and Educators ===
- Oscar H. Ibarra - Professor of the Department of Computer Science at the University of California, Santa Barbara, Distinguished Professor Emeritus at University of California, Santa Barbara, known for his work on Automata theory, Formal language and Computational complexity theory
- Katherine Luzuriaga — Vice Provost at the UMass Chan Medical School at Worcester, Massachusetts a part of the University of Massachusetts system, Immunologist, developed a functioning cure for HIV infected infants. Included in the Time 100 list of the most influential people in the world for 2013

=== National Scientists of the Philippines ===
- Angel Alcala - 9th President of Silliman University, 2nd Chairperson of the Commission on Higher Education, National Scientist of the Philippines, 23rd Secretary of Environment and Natural Resources
- Raul Fabella - Dean of the University of the Philippines School of Economics, National Scientist of the Philippines
- Gavino Trono - Professor at the University of the Philippines Marine Science Institute, National Scientist of the Philippines for Marine Biology

=== Other Notable Educators ===
- Larry Alcala - Chairman Department of Visual Communications University of the Philippines, introduced the first college degree course on Commercial design in the Philippines, National Artist of the Philippines for Visual Arts, Cartoonist and Illustrator known for his cartoons; Slice of Life, Mang Ambo, and Kalabog en Bosyo
- Jose Vasquez Aguilar - Father of the Community School Movement in the Philippines, first Filipino to receive the Ramon Magsaysay Award
- Elsa Martinez Coscolluela - Vice President for Academic Affairs at the University of St. La Salle in Bacolod, Multi award winning poet, writer and playwright
- Rolando Ramos Dizon - President of De La Salle University, President of Taguig City University, 4th Chairperson of the Commission on Higher Education
- Peque Gallaga — Artist-In-Residence and taught film and theater at the University of St. La Salle, multi-awarded filmmaker, screenwriter and actor
- Juan B. Lacson - Founder of John B. Lacson Foundation Maritime University
- William Valentine - Founder and 1st President of Central Philippine University

== Government and Political Personalities ==
=== Head of Government ===
- Aniceto Lacson - President of the Republic of Negros, Patriarch of Lacson family
- Jorge B. Vargas - de facto Head of the Philippine Government (Unofficial President of the Philippines) as the Chairman of the Philippine Executive Commission, 1st Executive Secretary of the Philippines, 1st Mayor of the City of Greater Manila, Member of the World Scout Committee of the World Organization of the Scout Movement, 1st filipino member of the International Olympic Committee

=== President of the Senate of the Philippines ===
- Migz Zubiri — 30th President of the Senate of the Philippines

=== Speaker of the National Assembly and Chief Justice of the Supreme Court ===
The Philippine senate was abolished from 1935-1941 and the Commonwealth of the Philippines had a unicameral legislature called the National Assembly of the Philippines. Its elected leader, the Speaker of the National Assembly was the third highest ranking official in the government after the President and Vice President. It is equivalent in rank to the President of the Senate of the Philippines today, but has more authority as the sole head of the legislature. Negros Occidental is notable for producing all the Speakers of the National Assembly of the Commonwealth era.

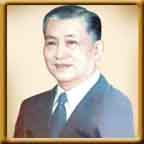
Jose Yulo

- Gil Montilla - 1st Speaker of the National Assembly of the Philippines, 9th Governor of Negros Occidental, Senator of the Philippines
- José Yulo -2nd Speaker of the National Assembly of the Philippines, 6th Chief Justice of the Philippines, 13th and 34th Secretary of Justice of the Philippines, Senator of the Philippines

=== Spouse or Partner of the President and Vice-President of the Philippines ===
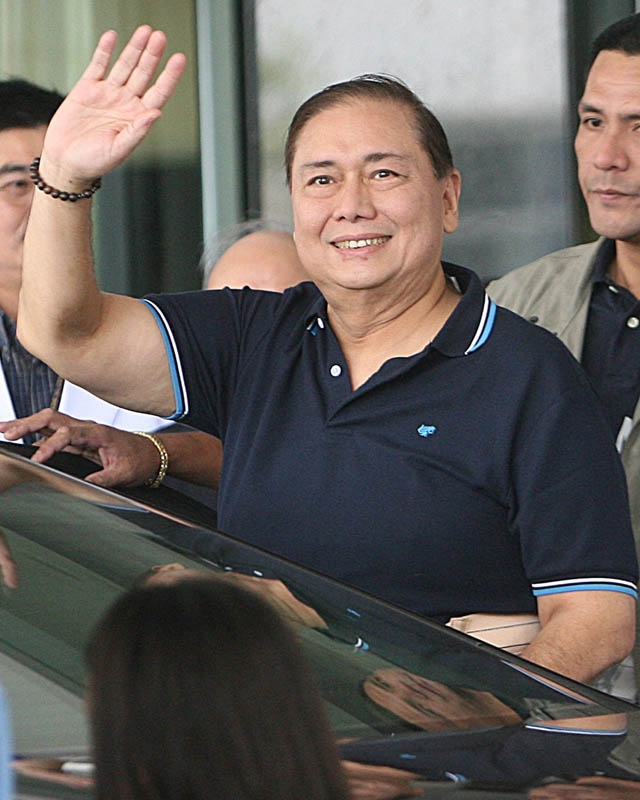
Jose Miguel Arroyo

- Jose Miguel Arroyo - First Gentleman of the Philippines as the husband of Gloria Macapagal Arroyo the 14th President of the Philippines, the first and only Male Spouse of the president of the Philippines during their term in office, he is also the second longest serving Presidential spouse after Imelda Marcos. 1st Second Gentleman of the Philippines when Gloria Arroyo was Vice President
- Guia Gomez - domestic partner to Joseph Estrada the 13th President of the Philippines, 18th Mayor of San Juan, Metro Manila, Actress
- Liza Araneta Marcos - First Lady of the Philippines as the wife of Bongbong Marcos the 17th President of the Philippines
- Celia Díaz Laurel - Second Lady of the Philippines as the wife of Salvador Laurel the 8th Vice President of the Philippines, theater actress, singer, painter

=== Member of the Cabinet of the Philippines ===
- Emilio Abello - Executive Secretary to three Philippine Presidents namely, Jose P. Laurel, Manuel Roxas, and Elpidio Quirino
- Angel Alcala - 23rd Secretary of Environment and Natural Resources, Chairperson of the Commission on Higher Education, National Scientist of the Philippines
- Rafael Alunan Sr. - Secretary of Finance, Secretary of Agriculture and Commerce, Secretary of the Interior
- Rafael Alunan III — Secretary of the Interior and Local Government, and Secretary of Tourism
- Jose Francisco Benitez - Director General of the Technical Education and Skills Development Authority (TESDA), Member of the House of Representatives of the Philippines
- Francisco Chavez - 25th Solicitor General of the Philippines
- Rolando Ramos Dizon — Chairperson of the Commission on Higher Education. La Sallian Brother
- Richie Garcia - 9th Chairman of the Philippine Sports Commission
- Raul M. Gonzalez - 55th Secretary of Justice (Philippines)
- Pedro Hernaez - Secretary of Commerce and Industry, Ambassador of the Philippines to Spain, Senator of the Philippines
- Anthony Golez - Presidential Spokesperson at the Office of the President of the Philippines
- Daniel Lacson Jr. — Chairman of the Philippine National Bank, Presidential Adviser for Rural Development, Chairman of the Presidential Council for Countryside Development, Chairman GSIS, 35th Governor of Negros Occidental
- Oscar Ledesma - Secretary of Commerce and Industry, Senator of the Philippines, Ambassador of the Philippines to the United States, 16th Governor of Iloilo
- Jose Locsin — Secretary of Health, Senator of the Philippines
- Teodoro Locsin Jr. -Press Secretary to the President of the Philippines, 20th Permanent Representative of the Philippines to the United Nations, 27th Secretary of Foreign Affairs (Philippines)
- Jose Apolinario Lozada - Appointments Secretary and Chief of Protocol, Member of the Philippine House of Representatives from Negros Occidental’s 5th congressional district
- Alfredo Montelibano, Sr. — Secretary of National Defense and Interior, 19th Governor of Negros Occidental, 1st City Mayor of Bacolod
- Enrique Ona - 29th Secretary of Health (Philippines)
- Mar Roxas - 30th Secretary of Trade and Industry (Philippines), Senator of the Philippines, 38th Secretary of Transportation and Communication, 37th Secretary of the Interior and Local Government
- Rafael M. Salas - 16th Executive Secretary (Philippines), United Nations Under-Secretary General, 1st and longest serving Executive Director of the United Nations Population Fund
- Judy Taguiwalo — Secretary of the Department of Social Welfare and Development
- Ramon Torres - 1st Secretary of Labor of the Philippines, 16th Governor of Negros Occidental, Senator of the Philippines
- Toni Yulo-Loyzaga - 33rd Secretary of Environment and Natural Resources
- Francisco Zulueta - Secretary of the Interior, Senator of the Philippines

=== Member of the Senate of the Philippines ===
- Esteban Abada - 9th President pro tempore of the Senate of the Philippines
- Esteban de la Rama - Senator of the Philippines
- JV Ejercito - Senator of the Philippines, 17th Mayor of San Juan, Metro Manila
- Espiridion Guanco - 2nd President pro tempore of the Senate of the Philippines
- Manuel Lopez - Senator of the Philippines, 5th Governor of Negros Occidental
- Isaac Lacson - Senator of the Philippines, 12th Governor of Negros Occidental
- Enrique B. Magalona — Senator of the Philippines
- Ruperto Montinola — Senator of the Philippines
- Serge Osmeña - Senator of the Philippines
- Grace Poe - Senator of the Philippines
- Mariano Yulo - Senator of the Philippines, 6th Governor of Negros Occidental

=== Associate Justice of the Supreme Court of the Philippines ===
- Emilio Hilado — Associate Justice of the Supreme Court of the Philippines
- Amy Lazaro-Javier - Associate Justice of the Supreme Court of the Philippines

=== Commissioner, Undersecretary and other national level officials ===
- David John Thaddeus P. Alba - 13th Administrator of the Sugar Regulatory Administration
- Nicolas A. Alonso - 6th Administrator of the Sugar Regulatory Administration
- Pablo Luis S. Azcona - 14th Administrator of the Sugar Regulatory Administration
- Jocelle Batapa-Sigue - Undersecretary of the Department of Information and Communications Technology
- Rafael L. Coscolluela - 8th Administrator of the Sugar Regulatory Administration, 38th Governor of Negros Occidental
- Raul Fabella- Member of the Executive Council of the National Academy of Science and Technology, National Scientist of the Philippines
- Rodolfo A. Gamboa - 2nd Administrator of the Sugar Regulatory Administration
- Wilson P. Gamboa - 4th Administrator of the Sugar Regulatory Administration
- Fritz Gaston -Commissioner of the Games and Amusements Board, Commissioner of the Philippine Sports Commission
- Rowena Guanzon — Commissioner of the Commission on Elections (Philippines)
- Jayvee Hinlo - Commissioner of the Presidential Anti-Corruption Commission
- José de Luzuriaga - Member of the Philippine Commission, 2nd Governor of Negros Occidental
- James C. Ledesma - 7th Administrator of the Sugar Regulatory Administration
- Dennis Mapa – Undersecretary of the Philippine Statistics Authority
- Monico Puentevella — Commissioner of the Philippine Sports Commission, Mayor of Bacolod, Member of the House of Representatives of the Philippines
- Ricardo Tan - Assistant secretary of the Department of Transportation and Communication, Member of the Bacolod City Council
- Bernardo C. Trebol - 9th Administrator of the Sugar Regulatory Administration
- Haydee Yorac — Chairman of the Commission on Elections (Philippines)
- Arsenio B. Yulo - 1st Administrator of the Sugar Regulatory Administration

=== Member of the House of Representatives of the Philippines ===
- Augurio Abeto - Member of the Philippine House of Representatives from Negros Occidental’s 3rd congressional district
- Gary Alejano - Member of the Philippine House of Representatives for Magdalo Party-List, Captain in the Philippine Marine Corps
- Mercedes Alvarez-Lansang - Deputy Speaker of the House of Representatives of the Philippines, Member of the House of Representatives of the Philippines for Negros Occidental’s 6th congressional district
- Diosdado Macapagal Arroyo — also known as Dato Arroyo — son of former President Gloria Macapagal Arroyo, member Philippine House of Representatives
- Iggy Arroyo - Member of the Philippine House of Representatives from Negros Occidental’s 5th congressional district, brother in law of former Philippine President Gloria Arroyo
- Mikey Arroyo — son of former Philippine President Gloria Arroyo, member Philippine House of Representatives
- Amado Bagatsing - Member of the House of Representatives of the Philippines from Manila’s 5th congressional district
- Ramon Bagatsing — 19th and longest serving Mayor of Manila, Member of the House of Representatives of the Philippines for Manila’s 3rd congressional district, Plaza Miranda bombing survivor
- Albee Benitez - Deputy Speaker of the House of Representatives of the Philippines, Member of the House of Representatives of the Philippines for Bacolod’s at large congressional district and Negros Occidental’s 3rd congressional district, 43rd Mayor of Bacolod, CEO and Chairman Brightlight Productions
- Javi Benitez - Mayor of Victorias, Member of the House of Representatives of the Philippines for Negros Occidental’s 3rd congressional district
- Charlie Cojuangco - Member of the Philippine House of Representatives for Negros Occidental’s 4th congressional district and Tarlac’s 1st congressional district
- Jaime Cojuangco - Member of the Philippine House of Representatives for Tarlac’s 1st congressional district
- Mark Cojuangco - Member of the House of Representatives of the Philippines for Pangasinan’s 5th congressional district
- Neri Colmenares — Member of the House of Representatives of the Philippines for Bayan Muna party-list
- Monsour del Rosario - Member of the House of Representatives of the Philippines for Makati’s 1st congressional district, Taekwondo champion, actor in film and television
- Jeffrey Ferrer - Member of the House of Representatives of the Philippines for Negros Occidental’s 4th congressional district, Vice Governor of Negros Occidental
- Arsenio Lacson - 1st elected Mayor of Manila, Member of the House of Representatives of the Philippines for Manila’s 2nd congressional district, broadcast journalist, member of the Philippine national football team
- Jules Ledesma - Member of the House of Representatives of the Philippines for Negros Occidental’s 1st congressional district
- Evelio Leonardia — Mayor of Bacolod, Member of the Philippine House of Representatives for Bacolod’s at large congressional district
- Alfredo G. Marañon, Jr. — Governor of Negros Occidental and Member of the House of Representatives of the Philippines for Negros Occidental’s 2nd congressional district
- Alfredo Marañon III - Member of the Philippine House of Representatives for Negros Occidental’s 2nd congressional district
- Tomas Osmeña — Member of the Philippine House of Representatives, Mayor of Cebu City
- Stephen Paduano - Member of the Philippine House of Representatives for Abang Lingkod Party-list
- Jose Maria Zubiri Jr. — 9th Governor of Bukidnon, Former Representative of Third District of Bukidnon

=== Local Government ===
- Rio Diaz - Vice Mayor of Pontevedra, Negros Occidental, Model, beauty queen, Tv host, film actress
- Bong Lacson - Mayor of San Carlos, 42nd Governor of Negros Occidental
- James Yap - Member of the city council of San Juan, Metro Manila, professional basketball player

=== Government officials outside of the Philippines ===
- Myla Arceno - first filipino Mayor and councilor of Stevenage, United Kingdom
- Dandy de Paula - Mayor of Hawaiian Gardens, California, a city in the United States of America
- Joey Manahan - Member of the Honolulu City Council in the State of Hawaii in the United States

== Heroes and Historical Figures ==
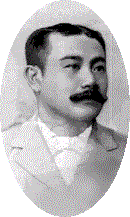
Aniceto Lacson

- Juan Araneta — Revolutionary, Secretary of War of the Republic of Negros
- Yves Leopold Germain Gaston — Pioneer of the sugar industry in Negros Island, Patriarch of the Gaston clan
- Antonio Ledesma Jayme — Revolutionary, Secretary of Justice Republic of Negros, 4th Governor of Negros Occidental
- Aniceto Lacson — Revolutionary, President of the Republic of Negros
- Papa Isio — Revolutionary
- Agustín Montilla y Orendáin - Pioneer of the sugar industry in Negros Island, Patriarch of the Montilla clan

== International Organization Figures ==
=== United Nations Figures ===
- Esteban Abada - Member of the Philippine delegation to the United Nations General Assembly, 8th President pro tempore of the Senate of the Philippines
- Pedro Hernaez - Vice-Chairman of the United Nations General Assembly’s Economic and Financial Committee, Secretary of Commerce and Industry, Ambassador of the Philippines to Spain, Senator of the Philippines
- Teodoro Locsin Jr. - 20th Permanent Representative of the Philippines to the United Nations 27th Secretary of Foreign Affairs, Press Secretary
- Katherine Luzuriaga — Consultant for the World Health Organization, Immunologist, developed a functioning cure for HIV infected infants. Included in the Time 100 list of the most influential people in the world for 2013
- Rafael M. Salas - United Nations Under-Secretary General, 1st and longest serving Executive Director of the United Nations Population Fund, 16th Executive Secretary of the Philippines

=== International Sports Organization Officials ===
- Rene Adad - Member of the Executive committee and Executive council of the Asian Football Confederation, Deputy chairman of the Asian Football Federation legal committee, 11th President of the Philippine Football Federation
- Remy Presas - Founder of the International Modern Arnis Federation which has splintered into several organizations worldwide after the death of its founder, however each group still honors the teachings and legacy of Remy Presas
- Monico Puentevella - Member of the Marketing and Television committee of FIFA, Vice President of the Asian Weightlifting Federation, Member of the House of Representatives of the Philippines, 40th Mayor of Bacolod, Commissioner of the Philippine Sports Commission
- Jorge B. Vargas - Member World Scout Committee of the World Organization of the Scout Movement, 1st filipino member of the International Olympic Committee, de facto Head of the Philippine Government (Unofficial President of the Philippines) as the Chairman of the Philippine Executive Commission, 1st Executive Secretary of the Philippines, 1st Mayor of the City of Greater Manila

=== Other International Organization Figures ===
- Joel Sarsiban Garcia - Chairperson of the Regional Cooperation Agreement on Combating Piracy and Armed Robbery against Ships in Asia (ReCAAP), Admiral, 28th Commandant of the Philippine Coast Guard
- Oscar H. Ibarra - Fellow of the American Association for the Advancement of Science, Fellow of the Institute of Electrical and Electronics Engineers, Fellow of the Association for Computing Machinery, Foreign Member of the Academia Europaea
- Franz Ontal - Head of inspector training at the Organisation for the Prohibition of Chemical Weapons (OPCW), he was serving in this capacity when the organization won the 2013 Nobel Peace Prize

== Military Officers ==
- Mary Grace Baloyo — Philippine Medal of Valor Recipient, the nation's highest military honor, First Lieutenant Philippine Air Force
- Joel Sarsiban Garcia - Admiral, 28th Commandant of the Philippine Coast Guard
- Victor Ibrado - General, 36th Chief of Staff of the Armed Forces of the Philippines the highest officer in the Philippine Military
- Rafael Jalandoni - General, 3rd Chief of Staff of the Armed Forces of the Philippines the highest officer in the Philippine Military
- Pascual Ledesma - the first Officer-in-Command of the Philippine Navy

== Religious Figures ==
- Jose Advincula - Cardinal (Catholic) ,2nd Bishop of the Diocese of San Carlos (Negros Occidental), 3rd Metropolitan Archbishop of the Archdiocese of Capiz, 33rd Metropolitan Archbishop of the Archdiocese of Manila
- Gerardo Alminaza - Catholic Prelate, 3rd Bishop of the Diocese of San Carlos (Negros Occidental)
- Patricio Buzon - Catholic prelate, 6th Bishop of the Diocese of Bacolod, 2nd Bishop of the Diocese of Kabankalan
- Niall O'Brien — Irish Columban Catholic missionary priest, writer of the Hiligaynon language bible
- Antonio Fortich —Catholic prelate, 3rd Bishop of the Diocese of Bacolod, political activist and Ramon Magsaysay Award recipient
- Louie Galbines - Catholic prelate, 3rd Bishop of the Diocese of Kabankalan , 7th Roman Catholic Bishop of the Diocese of Bacolod
- Camilo Diaz Gregorio - 4th Roman Catholic Bishop of the Diocese of Bacolod
- Romeo Intengan - Catholic Jesuit Priest, Provincial Superior of the Philippine province of the Society of Jesus, Social activist
- Vicente Salgado y Garrucho — Catholic prelate, 2nd Bishop of the Roman Catholic Diocese of Romblon
- Salvador Trane Modesto - Catholic prelate, Auxiliary Bishop of the Diocese of San Carlos (Negros Occidental)
- Nicolas M. Mondejar - Catholic prelate, 1st Bishop of the Diocese of Romblon, 1st Bishop of the Diocese of San Carlos (Negros Occidental)
- Vicente Navarra - Catholic prelate, 5th Bishop of the Diocese of Bacolod, 1st Bishop of the Diocese of Kabankalan
- Jesus Varela - Catholic Prelate, 1st Bishop of the Diocese of Ozamis, longest serving Bishop of the Diocese of Sorsogon, Chairman of the Catholic Bishops’ Conference of the Philippines Commission on Family and Life

== Other Notable Personalities ==
- Carl and Clarence Aguirre — Former conjoined twins
- Captain Felix Corteza Gaston, Philippine Airlines pilot at the center of historical early hijacking
- Rose Lacson-Porteous — Australian-Filipino socialite
- Tony Meloto — Philanthropist, founder of Gawad Kalinga

== Notable people with roots from Negros Occidental ==
List of people with a grandparent or direct ancestor who was born or raised in the province of Negros Occidental (Including the highly urbanized city of Bacolod)

- Cristal Bagatsing - Member of the House of Representatives of the Philippines from Manila’s 5th congressional district
- Don Juan Bagatsing - Member of the Manila City Council
- Hyram Bagatsing - professional basketball player
- Raymond Bagatsing - film and television actor
- RK Bagatsing - film and television actor
- Ginger Conejero — Former Miss Philippines Earth runner-up and a TV entertainment reporter and host for ABS-CBN
- Joe Devance — Basketball player who currently plays for the San Mig Coffee Mixers in the Philippine Basketball Association
- Mark Hartmann — Professional footballer who plays as a striker for Malaysian club Sarawak FA and member of the Philippines national football team
- Matthew Hartmann — Professional footballer who plays as a midfielder for Global Cebu F.C. in the Philippines Football League and former member of the Philippines national football team
- Ryan Hall - Professional footballer who plays as a midfielder for Meralco Manila in the Philippines Football League
- Denise Laurel - Film and TV actress, singer
- Brian Poe Llamanzares - Member of the House of Representatives of the Philippines
- Elmo Magalona — Actor and singer
- Frank Magalona — Actor and rapper
- Maxene Magalona — Actress in film and television
- Saab Magalona — Actress, singer, photographer and blogger
- Raimund Marasigan — Pinoy rock musician and icon
- Bamboo Mañalac - Musician, singer, songwriter
- Sandro Marcos - Member of the Philippine House of Representatives
- Andres Muhlach – Film and television actor, model
- Atasha Muhlach – Television actress and host, singer, model, debutante at the Bal des débutantes 2022
- Hiro Peralta — Actor
- Martin Steuble — Member of the Philippines national football team, professional football player for Ceres-Negros F.C. in the Philippines Football League.

== Notable Families ==
Partial list of notable families that have lived in Negros Occidental for more than a century and are closely associated with it.

- Araneta family
- Alunan family
- Benitez family
- Gaston family
- Lacson family
- Locsin family
- Magalona family
- Montelibano family
- Montilla family
- Lizares family
- Luzuriaga family

== See also ==
- List of people from Bacolod
- List of people from Dumaguete
