= List of people from Bacolod =

The following is a list of notable people who were either born in, lived in, are current residents of, or are otherwise closely associated with or around the city of Bacolod, in Negros Occidental of the Negros Island, Philippines.

== Entertainment ==
- Analyn Barro (born 1996), actress
- Migo Adecer (born 1999), Filipino-Australian actor and singer
- Ethan Benares (born 2006), Pinoy Big Brother: Collab 3.0 Housemate
- Alvin Elchico (born 1974), field reporter, journalist and television host
- Bobby Enriquez (1943–1996), jazz musician
- Peque Gallaga (1943–2020), Film director
- Allan K. (born 1958), TV host, actor, entertainer
- Ronnie Lazaro (born 1957), Film actor
- Kuh Ledesma (born 1955), singer and actress
- Pancho Magalona (1922–1998), actor
- Francis Magalona (1964–2009), Actor, singer, rapper, tv host
- Romy Pastrana (born 1958), actor and comedian
- Aurora Pijuan (born 1949), Miss International 1970
- Susan Roces (1941–2022), Film and television actress
- Vickie Rushton (born 1992), Mutya ng Pilipinas International 2011
- Sandra Seifert (born 1984), Miss Philippines Earth 2009
- Rosemarie Sonora (born 1948), Film actress
- Eduardo Sicangco, Filipino designer and illustrator
- Christian Vasquez (born 1977), Film and television actor and model
- Maggie Wilson (born 1989), Binibining Pilipinas World 2007
- Joel Torre (born 1961), Film and television actor and producer
- Angel Locsin (born 1985), Film and television actress, humanitarian
- Maxene Magalona (born 1986), Film and television actress, model
- Ella May Saison, singer and composer

== Literature ==
- Elsa Martinez Coscolluela, poet, short-story writer, and playwright
- Nonoy Espina (1962–2021), journalist

== Science and Medicine ==
- Raul Fabella (born 1949), National Scientist of the Philippines
- Katherine Luzuriaga — Vice Provost at the UMass Chan Medical School at Worcester, Massachusetts a part of the University of Massachusetts system, Immunologist, developed a functioning cure for HIV infected infants. Included in the Time 100 list of the most influential people in the world for 2013

== Politics ==
- Rafael Alunan III (born 1948), former Secretary of the Interior and local government and Secretary of Tourism
- Albee Benitez (born 1966) - Deputy Speaker of the House of Representatives of the Philippines, Member of the House of Representatives of the Philippines for Bacolod's at large congressional district and Negros Occidental's 3rd congressional district, 43rd Mayor of Bacolod, CEO and Chairman Brightlight Productions
- Neri Colmenares (born 1959), Member of the House of Representatives of the Philippines, human rights lawyer and activist
- JV Ejercito (born 1969) - Senator of the Philippines, 17th Mayor of San Juan, Metro Manila
- Richie Garcia - 9th Chairman of the Philippine Sports Commission
- Anthony Golez (born 1972) - Presidential Spokesperson at the Office of the President of the Philippines
- Guia Gomez (born 1942) - domestic partner to Joseph Estrada the 13th President of the Philippines, 18th Mayor of San Juan, Metro Manila, Actress
- Jayvee Hinlo (born 1971)- Commissioner of the Presidential Anti-Corruption Commission
- Mercedes Alvarez-Lansang (born 1942) - Deputy Speaker of the House of Representatives of the Philippines, Member of the House of Representatives of the Philippines for Negros Occidental's 6th congressional district
- Jose Apolinario Lozada (1950-2018) - Appointments Secretary and Chief of Protocol, Member of the Philippine House of Representatives from Negros Occidental's 5th congressional district
- José de Luzuriaga (1843-1921) - Member of the Philippine Commission, 2nd Governor of Negros Occidental
- Enrique Magalona (1891–1960), Senator of the Philippines
- Dennis Mapa (born 1969) - – Undersecretary of the Philippine Statistics Authority
- Alfredo Montelibano Sr. (1905–1989), Former Secretary of National Defense and Interior, 19th Governor of Negros Occidental, former Chairman of ABS-CBN Corporation
- Gil Montilla (1876-1946) - 1st Speaker of the National Assembly of the Philippines, 9th Governor of Negros Occidental, Senator of the Philippines
- Jocelle Batapa-Sigue - Undersecretary of the Department of Information and Communications Technology
- Ricardo Tan - Assistant secretary of the Department of Transportation and Communication, Member of the Bacolod City Council
- Judy Taguiwalo (born 1942) — Secretary of the Department of Social Welfare and Development
- Grace Poe (born 1968) - Senator of the Philippines
- Mariano Yulo (1873-1929)- Senator of the Philippines, 6th Governor of Negros Occidental
- Jose Maria Zubiri Jr. (born 1940) — 9th Governor of Bukidnon, Former Representative of Third District of Bukidnon
- Migz Zubiri (born 1969)— 30th President of the Senate of the Philippines

== Religion ==
- Rolando Ramos Dizon (1944-2012) - 4th Chairperson of the Commission on Higher Education La Sallian Brother
- Antonio Fortich (1913–2003), Catholic Prelate 3rd Bishop of Bacolod, political activist
- Jesus Varela (1927–2018), Catholic Prelate, 1st Bishop of the Diocese of Ozamis, longest serving Bishop of the Diocese of Sorsogon, Member of the permanent council of the Catholic Bishops' Conference of the Philippines

== Sports ==
- Nonoy Baclao (born 1987), professional basketball player
- Jeffrei Chan (born 1983), professional basketball player
- Monsour del Rosario (born 1965), martial artist and actor
- Boyet Fernandez (born 1971), former professional basketball player
- Ramil Gallego (born 1966), professional pool player
- Reynel Hugnatan (born 1978), professional basketball coach
- Noli Locsin (born 1971), retired professional basketball player
- Donnie Nietes (born 1982), professional boxer
- Christopher Remkes (born 1996), Filipino Australian gymnast
- Joan Tipon (born 1982), amateur boxer
- Ben Villaflor (born 1952), former professional boxer
- Genesis Servania (born 1991), professional boxer
- LA Revilla (born 1989), professional basketball player
- Jeff Manday (born 1995), professional basketball player
- Johann Chua (born 1992), professional pool player
- Melissa Gohing-Nacino (born 1991), professional volleyball player

== See also ==
- List of people from Negros Occidental
- List of people from Dumaguete
