= Montilla (disambiguation) =

Montilla is a municipality in Spain.

Montilla may also refer to:

== Surnames ==
- Agustin Montilla y Orendain, Spanish-Filipino entrepreneur
- Antonio Montilla (1935–2021), Venezuelan cyclist
- Carlos Montilla (born 1962), Venezuelan actor
- Gabriel Montilla (born 1979), Puerto Rican tennis player
- Gil Montilla (1876 – after 1938), Filipino politician
- Helen Montilla (born 1969), Spanish sailor
- José Montilla (born 1955), Spanish politician
- Mariano Montilla (1782–1851), Venezuelan general
- Pili Montilla (born 1978), Puerto Rican TV host and producer
- Silvetty Montilla (born 1967), Brazilian drag queen and actor
- Víctor J. Montilla (born 1970), Puerto Rican businessman and publishing executive

== Other uses ==
- Montilla-Moriles, a Spanish wine region and the wines it produces
