= USS LST-666 =

1944 LST-542-class tank landing ship

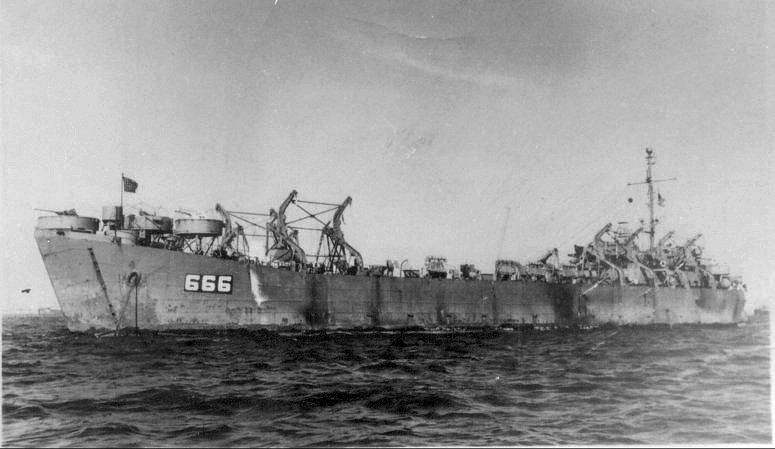
- USS LST-666 anchored off San Pedro, California, 10 February 1946

History

United States
- Name: USS LST-666
- Builder: American Bridge Company; Ambridge, Pennsylvania
- Laid down: 16 February 1944
- Launched: 24 April 1944
- Sponsored by: Mrs. A. I. Hay
- Commissioned: 16 May 1944
- Decommissioned: 20 June 1946
- Stricken: 31 July 1946
- Honors and awards: 6 battle stars, World War II
- Fate: Sold for scrap, 26 September 1946

General characteristics
- Class & type: LST-542-class tank landing ship
- Displacement: 1,625 tons (light); 4,080 tons (full)
- Length: 328 ft (100.0 m)
- Beam: 50 ft (15.2 m)
- Draft: 2 ft 4 in (0.71 m) fwd; 7 ft 6 in (2.29 m) aft (unloaded); 8 feet 3 inches (2.51 m) fwd; 14 feet 1 inch (4.29 m) aft (full load); 3 feet 11 inches (1.19 m) fwd; 9 feet 10 inches (3.00 m) aft (landing)
- Propulsion: Two General Motors 12-567, 900 hp diesel engines, two shafts, two rudders
- Speed: 12.0 knots (22.2 km/h) (max); 9 knots (17 km/h) (econ)
- Troops: 16 officers, 147 enlisted
- Complement: 7 officers, 104 enlisted
- Armament: 7 × 40 mm AA guns; 12 × 20 mm AA guns; 2 × .50 cal (12.7 mm) machine guns; 6 × .30 cal (7.62 mm) machine guns (one on each LCVP)

USS LST-666 was an LST-542-class tank landing ship built for the United States Navy in World War II. Like most ships of her class, she was not named and properly known only by her designation. Because of the biblical reference to the number, "666" in the Bible's Book of Revelation, USS LST-666 earned the unofficial nicknames, "The Devil's Ship" and "The Devil Ship".

== Construction and commissioning ==
LST-666 was laid down on 16 February 1944 at Ambridge, Pennsylvania, by the American Bridge Company. She was launched on 24 April 1944, sponsored by Mrs. A. I. Hay, and commissioned on 16 May 1944.

== Service history ==
During World War II, LST-666 was assigned to the Asiatic-Pacific theater and participated in the following operations:

- Western New Guinea operation: (Morotai landings), Halmahera Island, North Maluku, 15 September 1944
- Leyte operation: (Leyte landings) - Tacloban, 16 to 30 October and 9 to 29 November 1944
- Luzon operation: (Lingayen Gulf landings), 4 to 18 January 1945
- Manila Bay-Bicol operation: (Zambales-Subic Bay landings), La Paz, Bataan, 29 to 30 January 1945
- Consolidation and capture of the Southern Philippines: (Palawan Island landings), Puerto Princesa, 1 to 2 March 1945; (Visayas Island landings) - Iloilo, Panay Island and Pulupandan, Negros Island, 18 March and 29 March to 1 April 1945
- Borneo operation: (Balikpapan operation), East Kalimantan, 26 June to 9 July 1945

== Decommissioning and disposal ==
Following the war, LST-666 was decommissioned on 20 June 1946 and struck from the Navy List on 31 July 1946. On 26 September 1946, the ship was sold for scrap to Sun Shipbuilding & Dry Dock Co., of Chester, Pennsylvania.

== Honors and awards ==
LST-666 earned six battle stars for World War II service.
