= Serapion C. Torre =

Hiligaynon poet and writer

Serapion Torre
- Born: Serapion Cuartel Torre; November 14, 1892; Mandurriao, Iloilo, Captaincy General of the Philippines, Spanish East Indies
- Died: December 17, 1942 (aged 50); Mariveles, Bataan, Commonwealth of the Philippines
- Education: Liceo de Manila; University of Santo Tomas
- Occupation: Poet
- Writing career
- Pen name: Pio R. Sean
- Language: Hiligaynon

Serapion Cuartel Torre (November 14, 1892 – December 17, 1941) was a Filipino litterateur, poet, novelist, zarzuela writer, and playwright of the Hiligaynon language. He is widely known as the "Father of Modern Hiligaynon Literature". Some of his popular works are Sayup nga Ikamatay (1915) and Dagta nga Makatinlo (1919) for zarzuelas, and Bus-og nga Bulawan (1928) and Mater Dolorosa (1931) for novels.

He also served as Municipal President of Iloilo from 1923 to 1925. The plaza of Mandurriao was named in his honor by virtue of Republic Act No. 1023, approved on June 12, 1954.

== Early life and career ==
Torre was born on November 14, 1892, in Mandurriao, Iloilo City, to Victorino Morada Torre and Isabel Anima Cuartel. He attended Escuela Parroquial in Mandurriao, Iloilo Intermediate School, and Instituto de Molo. Torre completed his bachelor's degree at Liceo de Manila. Subsequently, he pursued dentistry at the University of Santo Tomas but did not complete the course. Torre was initially married to Maria Melliza in 1915 and later to Ester Sison. Torre has four children together named Romeo Alberto Melliza-Torre, Ester Melliza-Torre, George Gregorio Sison-Torre, and Oscar Jose Torre.

He served as Municipal President of Iloilo from 1923 to 1925. Prior to this, he held the position of Municipal Secretary from 1917 to 1921, served three terms as Iloilo Councilor, acted as secretary of the Provincial Board, and was a member of the 1st Constitutional Convention of the Philippines.

== Death ==
Serapion Torre died on December 17, 1942, when the ship he was traveling on sank in Mariveles, Bataan.

== Legacy ==
In recognition of his contributions to the Hiligaynon language and public service, he was honored on June 12, 1954, through the enactment of Republic Act 1023. This Act designated the public plaza in the Iloilo City district of Mandurriao as Serapion C. Torre Park.

== Works ==
He wrote about social issues such as labor problems, corruption, and land seizures. Known for his flowery language and in-depth exploration of his subjects, he, along with Flavio Zaragoza Cano and Delfin Gumban, are referred to as the “Trinidad Poetica Ilonga.” They are recognized as masters of poetic jousting in Hiligaynon or Balagtasan.

=== Zarzuelas ===
- Sayup nga Ikamatay (A Deadly Mistake) in 1915
- Dagta nga Makatinlo (The Cleansing Dye) in 1919

=== Novels ===
- Bus-og nga Bulawan (Pure Gold) in 1928
- Mater Dolorosa in 1931
- Pagbalik sang Gugma (When Love Came Back)
- Panaghuy sang Dughan (Scream of the Heart)
- Katipan nga Nadula (The Lost Lover)
- Gugma, Dungog kag Manggad (Love, Dignity, and Wealth)
- Ganhaan sang Impierno (Gate of Hell)
- Kalbaryo sang Isa ka Asawa (Calvary of a Husband)
- Gab-ing Walang Kaagahon (Night Without Morning)
- Dalitan nga Panublion (Cursed Inheritance)
- Larawan nga Nadula (Missing Picture)
- Duha ka Katipan (Two Lovers)
- Sa Kaalabaab sang Daigon (In the Fire of a Song)
- Marina, Gugma nga Ginlimot (Forgotten Love)
- Dugos kag Apdo (Pulút and Gall)
