= Jose Locsin =

Filipino medical doctor and senator

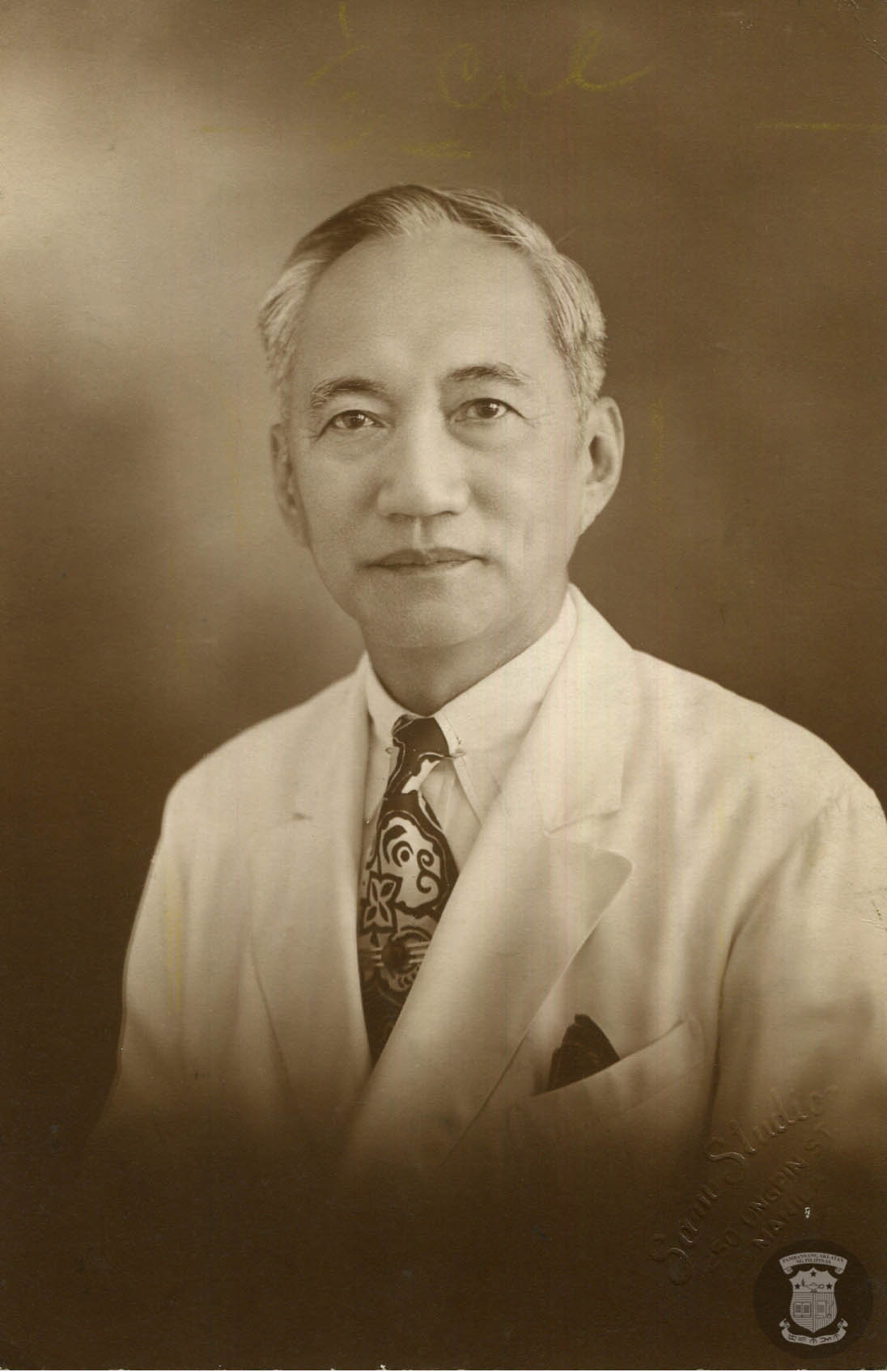

Secretary of Agriculture and Natural Resources
- In office September 15, 1961 – December 30, 1961
- President: Carlos P. Garcia; Diosdado Macapagal
- Preceded by: Cesar Fortich
- Succeeded by: Benjamin Gozon

Senator of the Philippines
- In office December 30, 1951 – December 30, 1957

Secretary of Health and Public Welfare
- In office June 29, 1945 – May 28, 1946
- President: Sergio Osmeña
- Preceded by: Basilio Valdes (Note: as Secretary of Health and Public Welfare)
- Succeeded by: Antonio Villarama; Asuncion Perez (Note: as Secretary of Public Welfare)

Member of the Philippine Legislature from Negros Occidental's 1st District
- In office June 5, 1928 – June 2, 1931
- Preceded by: Serafin P. Hilado
- Succeeded by: Enrique Magalona

10th Governor of Negros Occidental
- In office October 16, 1925 – October 15, 1928
- Preceded by: Gil Montilla
- Succeeded by: Agustin Ramos

Personal details
- Born: José Locsín y Corteza; August 27, 1891 Silay, Negros Occidental, Captaincy General of the Philippines
- Died: May 1, 1977 (aged 85) Manila, Philippines
- Citizenship: Filipino
- Party: Nacionalista
- Profession: Doctor, politician

Jose Corteza Locsin (August 27, 1891 – May 1, 1977) was a Filipino medical doctor and senator.

== Early life and education ==
Locsin was born on August 27, 1891, in Silay, Negros Occidental. He was the third child of Domingo Locsin and Enriqueta Corteza. His family, who was originally from Molo, Iloilo, was among the most prominent when they settled in Silay. They acquired lands and engaged in sugarcane farming. They were devout Roman Catholics.

Locsin finished his primary education in Silay. Thereafter, his parents sent him to Manila to study, first at Liceo de Manila and afterwards at the Universidad de Santo Tomas, where he graduated with the degree of Doctor of Medicine, receiving the honor “Meritissimus.”

== Medical practice ==
He started his medical profession in Silay, where he established the Maternity and Children’s Hospital which later became the Silay General Hospital. He was also responsible for the establishment of a Rest and Resettlement Center for Tuberculosis in Patag, Silay’s mountain barangay. He also organized several women's clubs to run puericulture centers. Apart from his initiatives in Silay, he was also responsible for the establishment of the Negros Occidental Provincial Hospital and later its School of Nursing.

== Political career ==
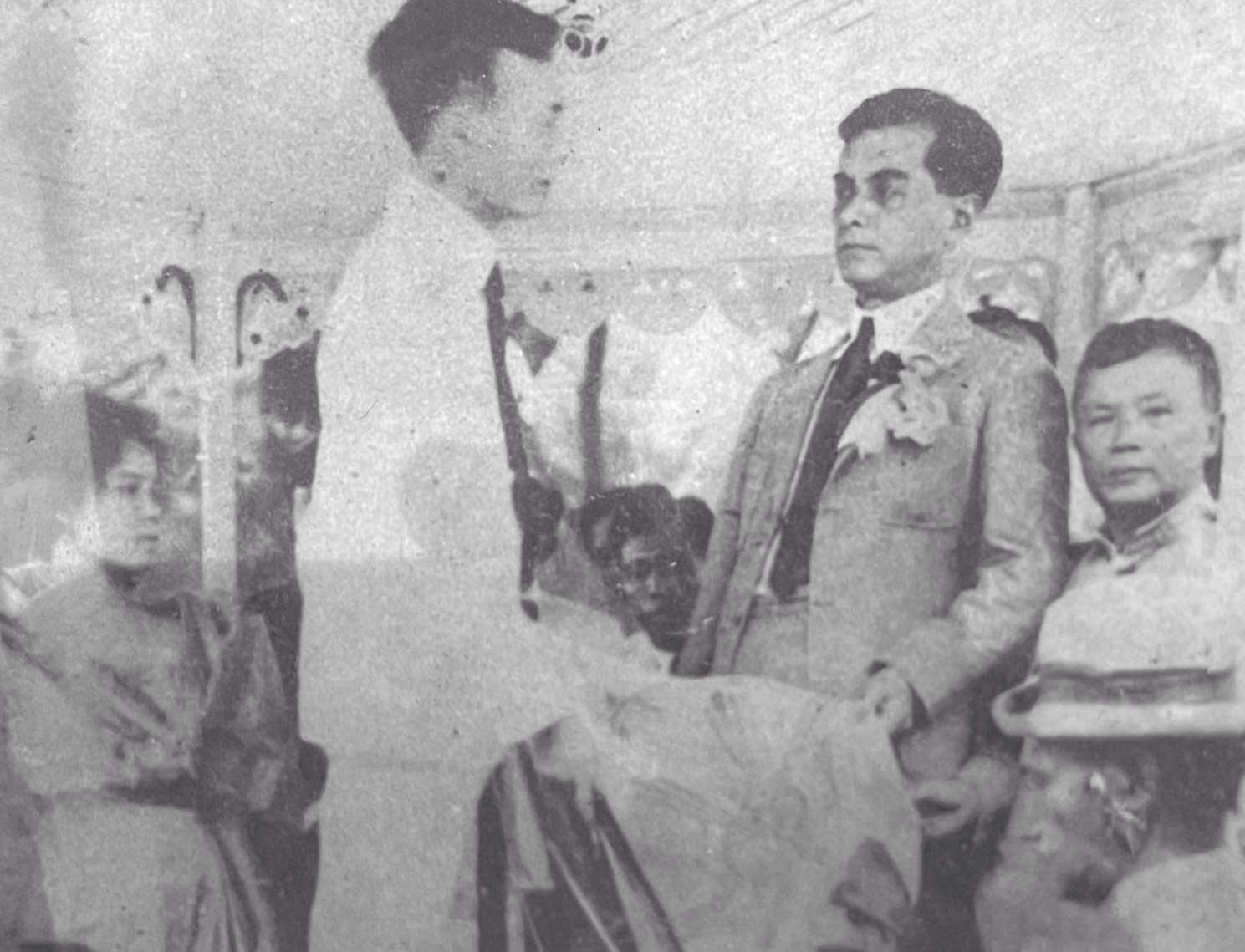
Locsin (left) with Senate President Manuel Quezon (right) during the 1925 campaign for Philippine independence.

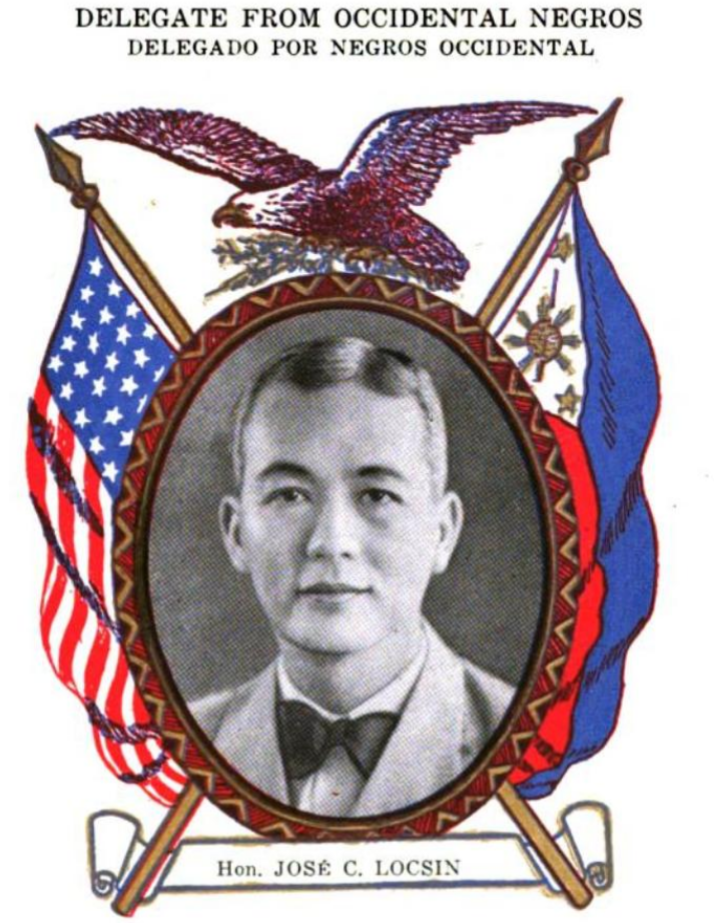
Locsin as a delegate to the Philippine Constitutional Convention, published by Benipayo Press (c. 1935)

He was elected as Municipal Councilor when he first decided to run for public office. After that, he was elected as provincial member of Negros Occidental. In 1925, he became Governor of Negros Occidental. In his three years as governor, he focused on building roads and bridges throughout the province further establishing a waterworks system. Along with the Provincial Board, he initiated the development of the provincial government building.

After his term as governor, he ran for Congress and was elected representative of the first district of Negros Occidental in 1928. As a representative of a district whose primary means of livelihood depend upon the sugar industry, he worked for the modernization of sugar centrals, increasing the share of sugarcane planters within the sugar produced, and raising the wages of farm laborers. As Chairman of the Committee on Public Instruction, he worked on the establishment of faculties in remote barrios and well plazas in towns to market cultural events.

In 1935, he became a delegate to the Constitutional Convention. One of his contributions as a delegate to the convention was the inclusion of social justice within the Constitution’s declaration of principles. Dr. Locsin was a member of the Nacionalista Party. When Ferdinand Marcos switched allegiance and ran for president in 1965 under Nationalista, Locsin supported Marcos’ candidacy. But when Marcos declared martial law in 1972, Locsin was disheartened and regretted having given his support to Marcos’ presidency. Although he was no longer active in politics during the time of Martial Law, Dr. Locsin wore a black ribbon as a sign of protest against Marcos.

== At the Senate ==
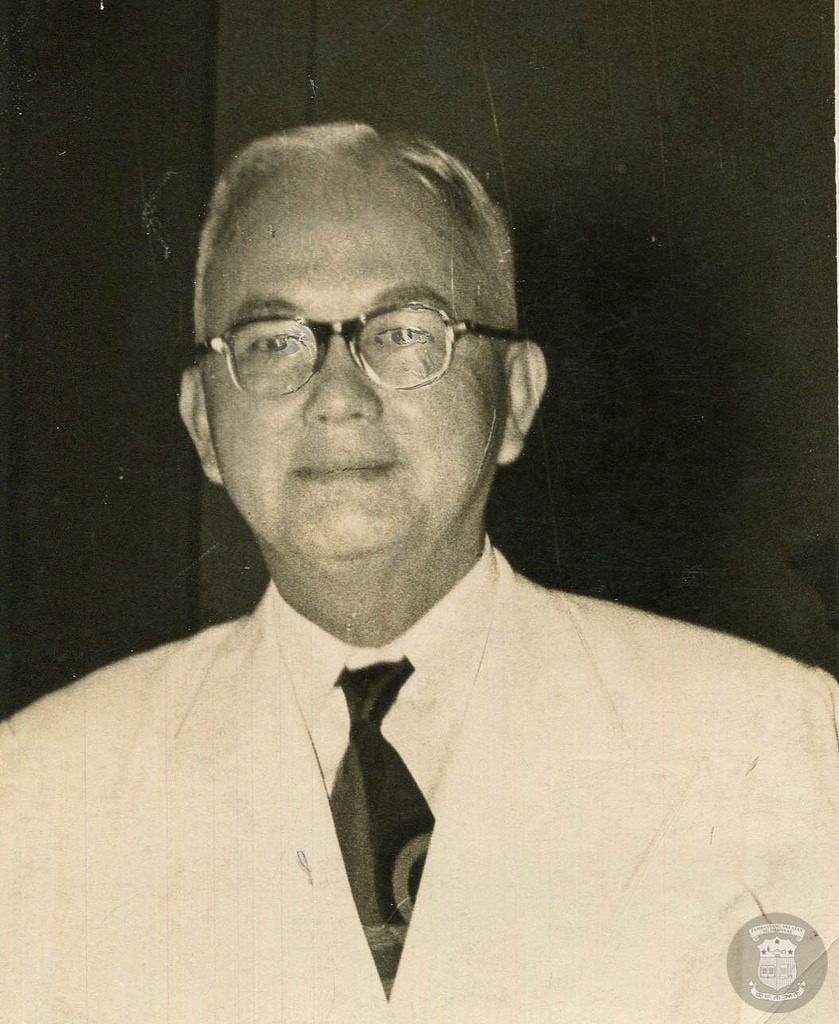
Locsin during his term as senator

Locsin was the first post-war cabinet member under President Sergio Osmena in 1945 to 1946, serving as Secretary of the Department of Health and Public Welfare to help people recuperate from the ravages of World War II. From 1951 to 1957, he served as a senator. As Chairman of the Health Committee, he worked for the establishment of Rural Health Units, the standardization of hospital services, and the National Campaign Against Tuberculosis. In addition, he also secured appropriations for the construction of new hospitals, health centers, clinics and other health care facilities. At the same time, he also worked for the improvement of salary levels of public health care personnel, especially doctors. He was also Chairman of the Committee on Accounts. His other achievements as a Senator include sponsorship of the Rural Banks Act; authorship of the Flag Ceremony Law which gave importance to recognizing and respecting the Philippine flag; increase of the salary of public school teachers; and passage of a measure to celebrate the centennial of the birth of Dr. Jose Rizal. Senator Locsin was a member of the Philippine economic mission headed by Senator Laurel which worked for the Laurel-Langley Trade Agreement of 1945.

== The Filipino First Policy ==
Locsin authored the bill popularly known as the “Filipino First Policy” during his term as Chairman of the National Economic Council (NEC, now the National Economic and Development Authority, or NEDA) from 1958 to 1961. As an effect of the Filipino First Policy, agro-industrial development was given impetus and encouragement. This resulted in the establishment of more cement factories, flour mills, and FILOIL–the first of the Filipino-owned gasoline companies. It also led to the banning of importation of plywood, the financing of irrigation and fertilizer programs, and the construction of artesian wells and hydro-electric power plants in different parts of the Philippines. Another major result was the development of new industries through the Industrial Dispersal Program, and the program for social and economic development of the Mindanao Region.

At the same time that he was Chairman of NEC, he headed the National Productivity Board of the Philippines. As such, he contributed to the establishment of the Asian Productivity Organization (APO) of which he was unanimously elected its first Chairman in May 1961 during its inaugural meeting in Tokyo, Japan. When his term as NEC Chairman ended in 1961, he was appointed as Acting Secretary of the Department of Agriculture and Natural Resources. During this short assignment, he had the licensing of forest concessions investigated which led to a marked reduction in the granting of such licenses and the filing of legal cases against illegal logging in the country.

== Legacy ==
Because of complications brought about by old age and his illnesses, Locsin became bedridden in 1976. On May 1, 1977, he died at the age of 88. Before his death, it was proposed that the city of Silay be renamed after him, but he refused.

After his death, the hospital in Silay was renamed after him. The Rizal Cultural and Civic Center in his hometown, Silay was also built in his honor and named after him. Recently, the Dr. Jose C. Locsin Memorial Provincial Hospital, which he had established, was closed down and all its services were transferred to the new Teresita L. Jalandoni Provincial Hospital. The Dr. Jose Corteza Locsin Ancestral House has been preserved in his honor.

== Personal life ==
He married Salvacion Montelibano and had eighteen children. One of his sons died of typhoid at the age of four. His wife died in 1959 of cardiac arrest. In 1962, at the age of 70, he remarried. His second wife, Delia Ediltrudes Santiago, a social worker from Bacolod, bore him a son and a daughter.
