= Manila Central University College of Nursing =

College of Nursing
- MCU College of Nursing and Midwifery Official logo
- Established: 1947
- Dean: Mr. Melvin Miranda
- Location: Filemon D. Tanchoco Bldg.
- Colors: Green and yellow
- Website: http://www.mcu.edu.ph

The Manila Central University College of Nursing, popularly known as "MCU Nursing", is the nursing school of the Manila Central University which is a private, non-sectarian educational institution.

== History ==
In June 1947, the permit to open the first year of the four-year course of the College of Nursing, was granted by the Bureau of Private Schools. Classes were held in the school building at Zurbaran St., Manila and the students’ clinical experiences were undertaken at the Manila General Hospital. The college offered a pioneer program in nursing, the 4-year baccalaureate program which conferred upon its graduates the degree of Bachelor of Science in Nursing (BSN). The existing nursing program in the country then, was the hospital-based School of Nursing, which conferred upon the graduates the title of Graduate in Nursing (G.N).

== Degree Program ==
- Bachelor of Science in Nursing - The BSN Program is a four-year program designed to prepare a professional nurse to render nursing care to individuals, families, and groups in any setting at any stage of the health-illness continuum. The curriculum is competency-and problem-based where the basic concepts in Nursing and the roles and responsibilities the students are expected to assume after graduation is considered.
