= Mandurriao Plaza =

Public plaza in Mandurriao, Iloilo City

Serapion C. Torre Park
- Mandurriao Plaza
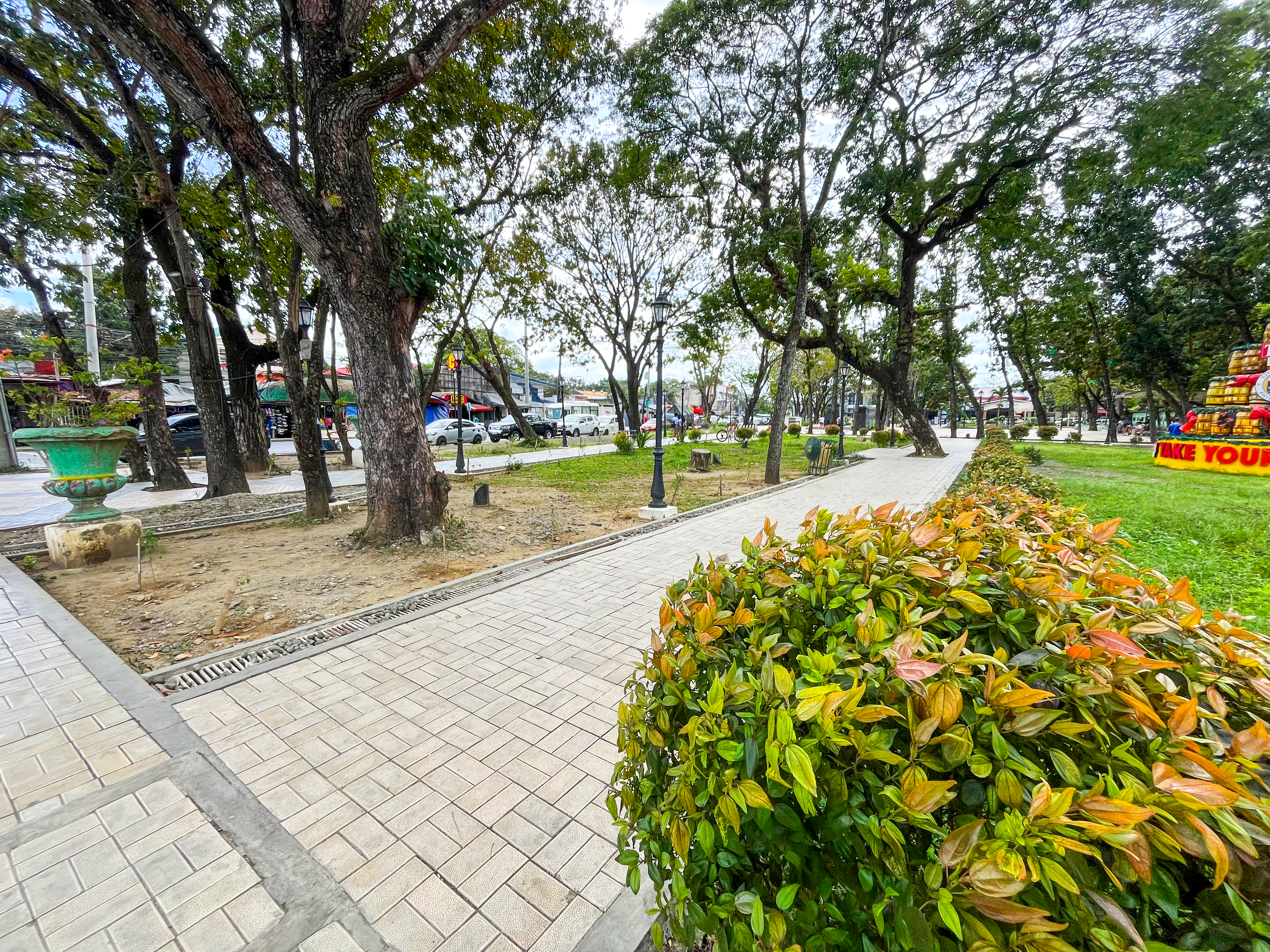
- The plaza in January 2025
- Interactive map of Serapion C. Torre Park
- Type: Urban park, town square
- Location: Mandurriao, Iloilo City, Philippines
- Coordinates: 10°43′2.4672″N 122°32′13.4304″E
- Area: 0.85 hectares (2.1 acres)
- Created: 1920s
- Etymology: Serapion Cuartel Torre

Mandurriao Plaza, formally known as Serapion C. Torre Park, is a public plaza and urban park in Mandurriao district in Iloilo City, Philippines. It is one of the six district plazas in Iloilo City.

The plaza was named after Serapion C. Torre, known as the 'Father of Modern Ilonggo Literature', through Republic Act 1023 enacted on June 12, 1954.

It is also currently under redevelopment, the same as six other district plazas in the city.
