= List of people from Dumaguete =

The following is a list of notable people who were either born in, lived in, are current residents of, or are closely associated with the city of Dumaguete, in Negros Oriental, a province in Negros Island, Philippines.

== Business, economics, and finance ==
- Juanita Amatong, Philippine Secretary of Finance and first woman executive director in the World Bank Group

== Cinema and broadcast arts ==
- Elizabeth Cooper [Isabel Rosario Cooper], actress and mistress of Gen. Douglas MacArthur
- Glydel Mercado, actress
- Gino Antonio, actor
- Theodore Boborol, director
- Beauty Gonzalez, actress and Pinoy Big Brother: Teen Edition Plus 4th Teen Placer
- Bret Jackson, actor and Pinoy Big Brother housemate
- Eddie Romero, director, screenwriter, and National Artist for Cinema and Broadcast Arts
- Dennis Trillo, actor, model, singer, and TV host

== Education and library science ==
- Leonor Briones, Secretary of the Department of Education and former Treasurer of the Philippines

== Historical figures ==
- Dios Buhawi, revolutionary
- León Kilat, revolutionary
- Papa Isio, revolutionary

== Law ==
- Edgardo Delos Santos, Associate Justice of the Supreme Court
- Felix Makasiar, Chief Justice of the Supreme Court

== Literature and historiography ==
- Merlie M. Alunan, poet and Carlos Palanca Memorial Award winner
- César Ruiz Aquino, poet, fictionist, SEAWrite awardee, and four-time Carlos Palanca Memorial Award winner
- Elsa Martinez Coscolluela, poet, fictionist, playwright, co-founder of the IYAS National Writers Workshop, and Carlos Palanca Memorial Award Hall-of-Famer
- Leoncio P. Deriada, poet, fictionist, playwright and Carlos Palanca Memorial Award Hall-of-Famer
- Lakambini Sitoy, fictionist and Carlos Palanca Memorial Award winner
- Edilberto Tiempo, novelist, critic, co-founder of the Silliman University National Writers Workshop, and SEAWrite awardee
- Edith Tiempo, poet, novelist, critic, co-founder of the Silliman University National Writers Workshop, and National Artist for Literature
- Rowena Tiempo Torrevillas, poet, fictionist, essayist, and Carlos Palanca Memorial Award winner

== Media and journalism ==
- Crispin Maslog, journalist and educator

== Military and law enforcement ==
- Dionardo Carlos, 27th Chief of the Philippine National Police
- Cirilito Sobejana, general, incumbent Chairman of the Joint Chiefs of Armed Forces of the Philippines, and recipient of the Medal of Valor

== Music ==
- Boboy Garovillo, singer and member of APO Hiking Society
- Budoy Marabiles, reggae musician

== Politics, diplomacy, and civic work ==
- Juanita Amatong, former Secretary of the Department of Finance
- Kira Danganan-Azucena, diplomat
- Emilio Macias, provincial governor
- José E. Romero, congressman, senator, first Philippine Ambassador to the Court of St. James's and former Secretary of the Department of Education
- Jose V. Romero Jr., Philippine Ambassador to Italy
- Lorenzo Teves, senator
- Margarito Teves, congressman and former Secretary of the Department of Finance
- Hermenegildo Villanueva, senator

== Religion and theology ==
- Mariano Bernad, last Spanish colonial parish priest of Dumaguete and historian
- Bishop Julito Buhisan Cortes, incumbent bishop of the Roman Catholic Diocese of Dumaguete
- Bishop Glenn M. Corsiga, bishop-elect of the Roman Catholic Diocese of Ipil
- Bishop John F. Du, third bishop of the Roman Catholic Diocese of Dumaguete
- Antonio Fortich, Catholic bishop and social activist
- Angel Lagdameo, second bishop of the Roman Catholic Diocese of Dumaguete, 5th Archbishop of the Archdiocese of Jaro, 16th President of the Catholic Bishops' Conference of the Philippines
- Ryan Jimenez, Bishop of the Roman Catholic Diocese of Chalan Kanoa in the Northern Mariana Islands

== Sciences ==
- Angel C. Alcala, biologist and National Scientist
- Rozzano Locsin, nursing academic

== Sports and athletics ==
- Jennifer Dy Chan, archer and Olympian
- Mark Javier, archer and Philippine delegate to the Beijing Olympics
- Marlon Maro, football coach and former international football player
- Paula Lynn Obanana, international badminton player
- Jerom Lastimosa, Adamson Soaring Falcons college basketball player and SEA Games gold medalist

== Theatre arts ==
- Junix Inocian, actor
- Frances Makil-Ignacio, actor

== Visual arts ==
- Paul Pfeiffer, multimedia artist

== See also ==
- List of people from Bacolod
- Negros Oriental#Notable personalities
