= Agustín Montilla y Orendáin =

Don Agustín Montilla y Orendáin was a Philippine-born Spaniard entrepreneur. He was “the first of a wave of new settlers to western Negros, beginning around 1840” and one of the first to produce sugar from sugarcane in commercial quantities on the island.

== Early life ==
Agustín Montilla was born to Capitán Don José Montilla, who was interim Governor of the Mariana Islands from 15 August 1822 to 15 May 1823, and Josefa Orendáin. Agustin had four younger sisters: Maria Dolores, Manuela, Ignacia, and Carmen.. He would settle permanently in the coastal town of Pulupandan in Negros Occidental province where he bought large tracts of land and established the sugarcane plantation named Hacienda Constancia.

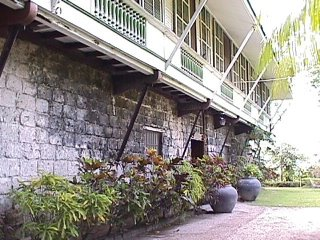
Montilla Ancestral House

== Notable Descendants ==
=== Botany ===
- Rene Alfred Anton Bustamante: Filipino botanist IPNI standard form: R.Bustam. relates to the same person. Research Associate at the Philippine Taxonomic Initiative.Vanilla raabii was named in his honor.
- Martha Rivilla - Grammatophyllum martae was named in her honor.

=== Business ===
- Eduardo Gutierrez Abello: Former Chief Financial Officer of First Philippine Holdings, former Chief Credit Officer of International Finance Corporation.
- Eduardo Jose P. Abello: Advisor, Unit Head of Asian Development Bank, former Vice President of HSBC Securities USA, former Vice President of Bank of Tokyo-Mitsubishi Trust Company, CFA charterholder.
- Jose Ma. Gutierrez Abello: Former President of Philippine American Investments Corporation (PAIC).
- Manuel Gutierrez Abello: 1958 Bar Topnotcher, Founding Partner of Angara Abello Concepcion Regala & Cruz Law Offices (ACCRALAW), former Chairman of the Philippine Securities and Exchange Commission.
- Jorge L. Araneta - President and CEO of the Araneta Group; son of J. Amado Araneta, ranked as the 47th richest person in the Philippines by Forbes Magazine on 2021 with a networth of $215 million USD
- Judy Araneta-Roxas - Papal Awardee, vice chair of the Araneta Group, political activist, social development practitioner, widow of former Senator Gerry Roxas the son of former Philippine President Manuel Roxas.
- Margarita Forés - daughter of Maria Lourdes "Baby" Araneta-Fores, granddaughter of J Amado Araneta. Celebrity chef and businesswoman in Manila. Owner of 10 Italian inspired restaurants including Cibo, Pepato, Café Bola and Pepato restaurants. Other businesses include Fiori di M and Casa di M, high-end floral and housewares design, respectively. Designated as a UNWTO Ambassador for Gastronomy Tourism at the 23rd United Nations World Tourism Organisation (UNWTO) Congress.
- Soledad "Gretchen" Oppen-Cojuangco - widow of tycoon Eduardo Cojuangco Jr., ranked as the 17th richest person in the Philippines by Forbes Magazine on 2025 with a networth of $1.15 billion USD

=== Government ===
- Emilio Montilla Abello: Executive Secretary to Philippine Presidents Jose Laurel, Manuel Roxas and Elpidio Quirino, Philippine Ambassador to the United States, Assemblyman in the Interim Batasan Pambansa, Minister of State for Energy under Philippine President Ferdinand Marcos, Chairman and President of Meralco and First Philippine Holdings, Chairman of PCI Bank, Co-founder and Founding Chairman of Metropolitan Bank and Trust Company, Namesake of Philippine Department of Energy’s Don Emilio Abello Energy Efficiency Awards.
- Genaro Montilla Alvarez jr. - former vice-governor of Negros Occidental
- Mercedes Alvarez-Lansang - former Deputy Speaker of the House of Representatives of the Philippines
- Petronila "Girly" Peña Garcia - current Ambassador to Canada, the first career diplomat and first woman ambassador to be appointed to the post. Previously, she was Ambassador to Israel. Before that, she was Ambassador to Egypt with concurrent jurisdiction over the Sudan. The appointment made her the Philippines' first woman ambassador to be posted in an Arab country.
- Agustin Montilla IV - named one of the Philippines' top 100 lawyers by Asia Business Law Journal; listed as a leading lawyer in Chambers Asia Pacific, AsiaLaw Profiles, and The Legal 500 Asia Pacific.
- Maria Gina Montilla Lizares - Mayor of Sipalay
- Enrique Montilla III - former Mayor of Isabela, Negros Occidental
- Gil Montilla - 1st Speaker of the National Assembly of the Philippines, the 3rd highest ranking official in the Commonwealth of the Philippines
- José Montilla : part of the rebel delegation in the Negros Revolution
- Mercedes M. Montilla - 1936 Miss Philippines of the Manila Carnival and mayor of Sipalay, Negros Occidental for three terms.
- Oscar C. Montilla - former Mayor of Sipalay
- Manuel "Mar" Araneta Roxas II: Former senator of the Philippines.
