= Manila Central University =

Private university in Caloocan, Philippines

- Pamantasang Manila Sentral (Filipino)
- Former names: Escuela de Farmacia del Liceo de Manila (1904–1915); Manila College of Pharmacy (1915–1929); Manila College of Pharmacy and Dentistry (1929–1945); Manila College of Pharmacy and Liberal Arts (1945–1946); Manila Central Colleges (1946–1948)
- Motto: In Scientia Solidaritas (Latin)
- Motto in English: Solidarity in Science
- Type: Private Non-sectarian stock Coeducational Basic and Higher education institution
- Established: December 6, 1904; 121 years ago
- Founder: Alejandro Albert
- Academic affiliations: PAASCU PACUCOA
- Chairman: Luningning Tanchoco Estanislao
- President: Renato Tanchoco Jr.
- Location: Caloocan, Metro Manila, Philippines; 14°39′33″N 120°59′10″E
- Campus: Urban 10 hectares (100,000 m^{2})
- Alma Mater song: "Dalit ng MCU"
- Colors: Purple and Gold
- Nickname: Supremos
- Sporting affiliations: UCAL
- Website: mcu.edu.ph

- Location in Metro Manila Location in Luzon Location in the Philippines

Manila Central University (MCU), formerly known as the Escuela de Farmacia del Liceo de Manila, is a private, non-sectarian, stock basic and higher education institution located on EDSA, Caloocan, Philippines. It was founded in 1904 by Alejandro M. Albert, who also was its first director.

MCU is the first pharmacy school run by Filipinos, and the first nursing school that offered the four-year Bachelor of Science in Nursing program in the Philippines. The patron of the university is Minerva. MCU was a member university of the University Athletic Association of the Philippines from 1952 to 1962.

== History ==
National historical marker

In 1903, at the request of several students from the University of Santo Tomas and other nearby schools, Alejandro Albert organized a private review class.

The review class developed into the Escuela de Farmacia del Liceo de Manila in 1904, with Albert as the founder and director. Later on, due to the steady increase in enrollment, it was transformed into the Manila College of Pharmacy, with Leon Maria Guerrero, Antonio Llamas, Feliciano Paterno and Filemon Tanchoco Sr. as the incorporators. It was the first educational institution of its kind established and managed by Filipinos. Its initial organization was barely four years after the establishment of the Philippine education system.

In 1929 its board of trustees, answering a long-felt need for the training of the youth for dental services, opened the college of Dentistry. Manila College of Pharmacy became then the Manila College of Pharmacy and Dentistry in the pre-war era. Second World War closed its portals in 1941.

During the Japanese occupation, the enemy looted its facilities, laboratory, equipment, and museums. During the liberation period, it was further looted of everything but the shell of its two buildings.

After the liberation of the Philippines, the board of trustees reorganized the college into Manila Central Colleges.

In addition to Pharmacy and Dentistry, the reorganized institution offered courses in liberal arts, education, commerce, business administration and postgraduate courses in pharmacy. In 1947, the College of Medicine was added. In 1948, it became the Manila Central University after opening the College of Nursing and Graduate School.

In 1949, the MCU inaugurated its 10-hectare campus in Caloocan. The colleges of Optometry and Midwifery, and the High School and Kindergarten departments were opened.

The university's varsity team, the Tigers, competed in the University Athletic Association of the Philippines from 1952 to 1962. MCU's best finish in the centerpiece seniors basketball tournament was runner-up to University of the East in 1958.

== Colleges ==
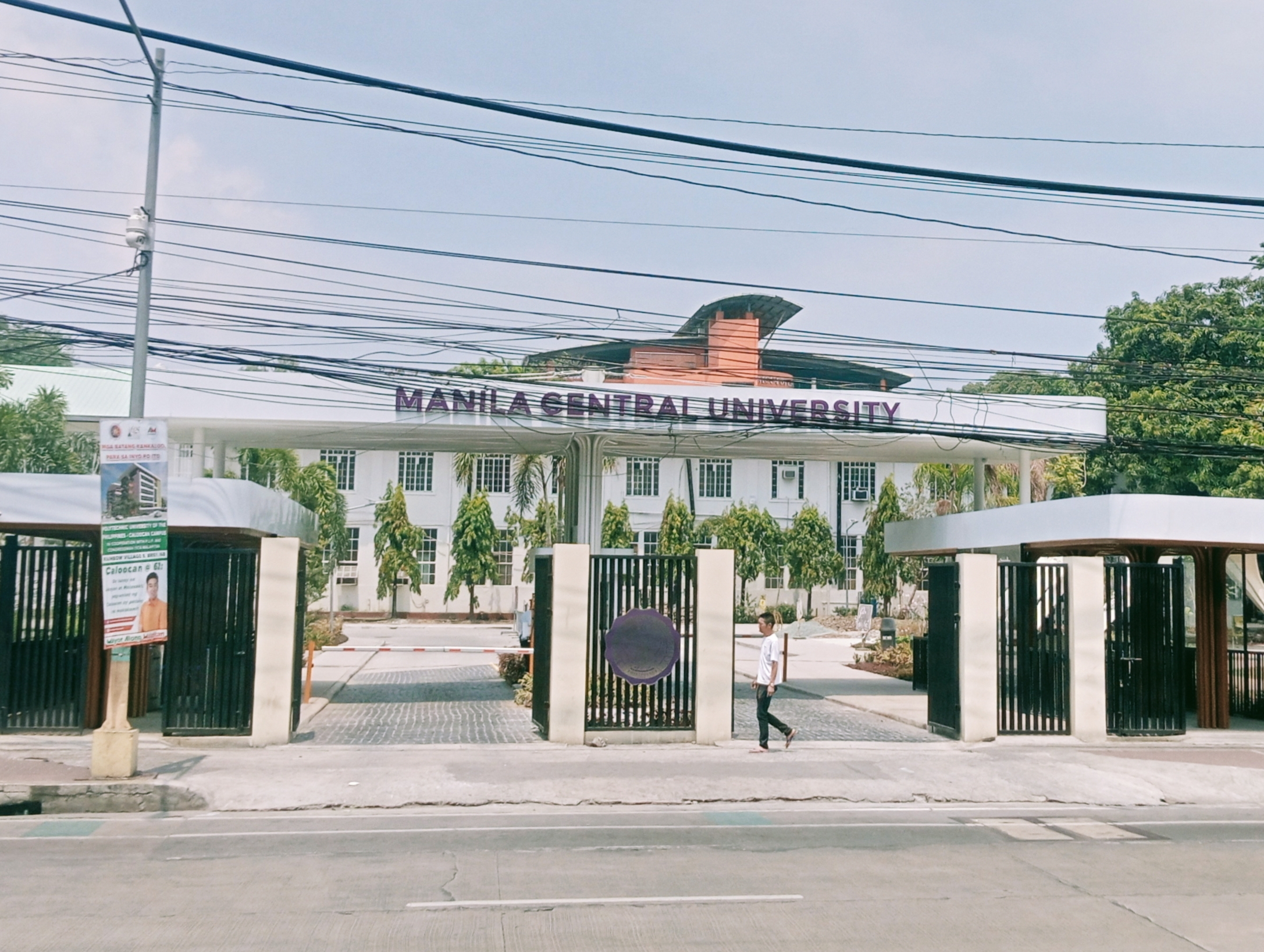
Manila Central University campus

- College of Medicine
- College of Nursing
- College of Pharmacy
- College of Dentistry
- College of Optometry
- College of Medical Technology
- College of Physical Therapy
- College of Arts and Sciences
- School of Business and Management
- Institute of Education
- Graduate School
- Basic Education Department

== Sports program ==
The Manila Central University was a member of the University Athletic Association of the Philippines (UAAP) from 1952 until their withdrawal in 1962. They have won the women's volleyball championships in Seasons 20 and 24.

== Notable alumni ==
- Salvador Flores, brigadier general
- Rizalino Garcia, brigadier general
- Uchenna Ikonne, optometry professor
- José Corazón de Jesús, poet
- Teodoro Kalaw, legislator and scholar
- Serapion Torre, poet
- Arsenio Luz, businessman and journalist
- Iñigo Ed. Regalado, writer
- Rico Robles, disc jockey
- Zaldy Zshornack, actor (MCU high school)
- Elijah Alejo, actress (MCU senior high school)

== See also ==
- List of universities and colleges in the Philippines
