= Pulupandan =

Municipality in Negros Occidental, Philippines

- Municipality
- Municipality of Pulupandan
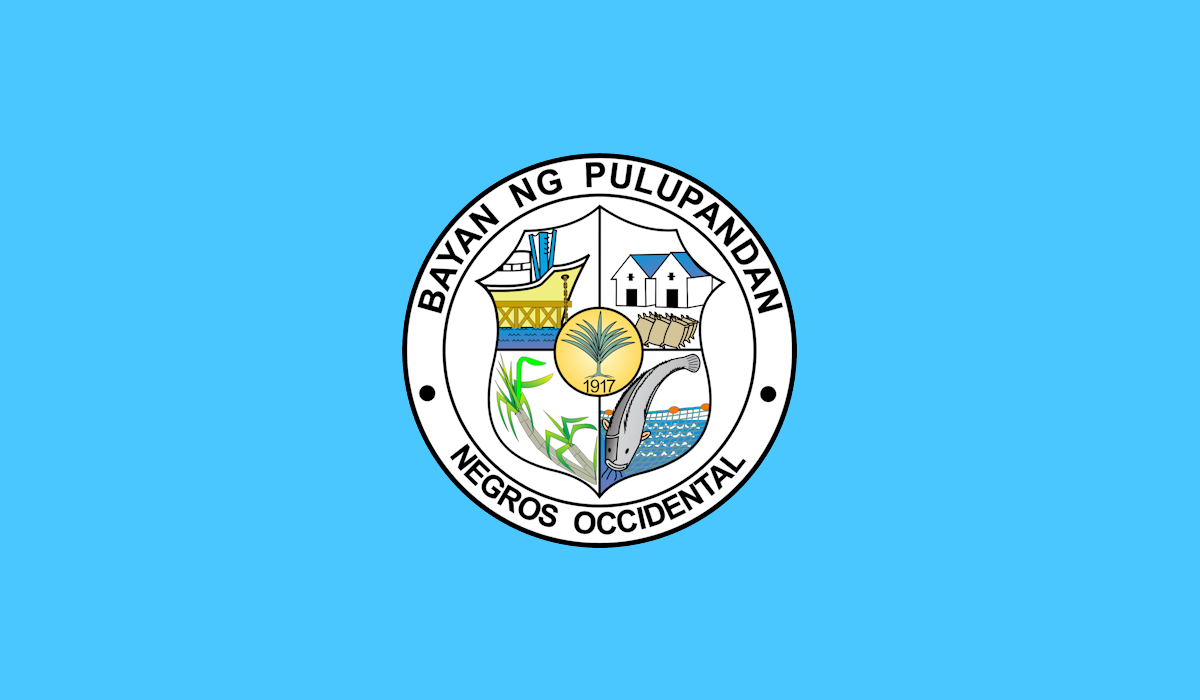
- Flag Seal

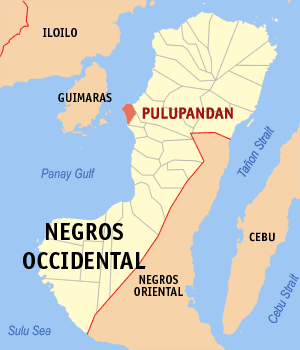
- Map of Negros Occidental with Pulupandan highlighted
- Interactive map of Pulupandan
- Location within the Philippines
- Coordinates: 10°31′N 122°48′E
- Country: Philippines
- Region: Negros Island Region
- Province: Negros Occidental
- District: 4th district
- Founded: January 1917
- Named for: Puntod Island, formerly called Pulo sang Pandan
- Barangays: 20 (see Barangays)

Government
  - Type: Sangguniang Bayan
  - Mayor: Miguel Antonio C. Peña (NPC)
  - Vice Mayor: Anthony Gerard A. Suatengco (PFP)
  - Representative: Jeffrey P. Ferrer (NUP)
  - Municipal Council: Members: Marie Grace P. Cepida; Rona Mae T. Galimba; Jose Gabriel C. Suatengco; Lorenzo Eduardo Mario Antonio P. Suatengco; Federico O. Montilla; Federico F. Infante, Jr.; Ryan Stephen M. Paloa; Yves Rodin A. Valenzuela
  - Electorate: 18,028 voters (2025)

Area
  - Total: 23.00 km^{2} (8.88 sq mi)
- Elevation: 2.0 m (6.6 ft)
- Highest elevation: 22 m (72 ft)
- Lowest elevation: 0 m (0 ft)

Population (2024 census)
  - Total: 31,942
  - Density: 1,389/km^{2} (3,597/sq mi)
  - Households: 7,701

Economy
  - Income class: 3rd municipal income class
  - Poverty incidence: 14.4% (2023)
  - Revenue: ₱ 139.3 million (2024)
  - Assets: ₱ 344.8 million (2024)
  - Expenditure: ₱ 136.2 million (2024)
  - Liabilities: ₱ 252.5 million (2024)

Service provider
  - Electricity: Negros Occidental Electric Cooperative (NOCECO)
- Time zone: UTC+8 (PST)
- ZIP code: 6102
- PSGC: 064522000
- IDD : area code: +63 (0)34
- Native languages: Hiligaynon; Tagalog

Pulupandan, officially the Municipality of Pulupandan (Hiligaynon: Banwa sang Pulupandan; Tagalog: Bayan ng Pulupandan), is a municipality in the province of Negros Occidental, Philippines. According to the 2024 census, it has a population of 31,942 people. The town is known for their annual "Salapan Festival".

== Etymology ==
The town's name is derived from the vernacular phrase Pulo sang Pandan, meaning the "Isle of Pandan". Pandan itself is a Malayo-Polynesian vocabulary for a plant with the scientific name Pandanus amaryllifolius.

Saint Philomena is the town’s patron saint, with her feast day celebrated on February 15. The town’s main street is named in her honor as St. Philomena, the Wonderworker.

== History ==
Formerly a barrio of Valladolid, Pulupandan was organized into an independent pueblo, along with Sum-ag, Ma-ao, Dancalan, and other neighboring areas, in 1899 under the Republic of Negros, following the successful revolution of the Negrenses against Spain.

In 1903, after the short-lived existence of the Negros Cantonal Government, a Re-organization Committee was established in line with the restructuring of the government during the American occupation. Ironically, however, Pulupandan was once again incorporated as a barrio of Valladolid under this re-organization. It remained a barrio until 1916, when it was segregated from Valladolid and re-established as an independent municipality. Pulupandan was officially recognized as a town under the mandate of Governor General Francis Burton Harrison through Executive Order No. 95, dated December 23, 1916. This took effect on January 1, 1917, and was implemented by Resolution No. 36 of the Provincial Board of Negros Occidental, dated January 12, 1917, during the tenure of Governor Matias Hilado.

It was in the beaches of Pulupandan in the early dawn of March 29, 1945 that the historical event of the landing of American liberation forces without any opposition, who together with the Filipino guerillas, drive the Japanese forces away from the island of Negros during the Battle of the Visayas.

== Geography ==
With an area of 23 square kilometers, Pulupandan is the smallest town in terms of area in Negros Occidental. It is 29 kilometres (18 mi) from Bacolod.

=== Barangays ===
Pulupandan is politically subdivided into 20 barangays. Each barangay consists of puroks and some have sitios.

- Barangay Zone 1 (Pob. / Green beach)
- Barangay Zone 1-A (Pob. / Paco beach)
- Barangay Zone 2 (Poblacion)
- Barangay Zone 3 (Poblacion)
- Barangay Zone 4 (Poblacion)
- Barangay Zone 4-A (Poblacion)
- Barangay Zone 5 (Poblacion)
- Barangay Zone 6 (Poblacion)
- Barangay Zone 7 (Poblacion)
- Canjusa
- Crossing Pulupandan
- Culo
- Mabini
- Pag-ayon
- Palaka Norte
- Palaka Sur
- Patic (Sitio Calubihan)
- Tapong
- Ubay
- Utod

=== Climate ===
Climate data for Pulupandan, Negros Occidental
Month	Jan	Feb	Mar	Apr	May	Jun	Jul	Aug	Sep	Oct	Nov	Dec	Year
Mean daily maximum °C (°F)	28 (82)	29 (84)	30 (86)	32 (90)	32 (90)	31 (88)	30 (86)	29 (84)	29 (84)	29 (84)	29 (84)	28 (82)	30 (85)
Mean daily minimum °C (°F)	23 (73)	23 (73)	23 (73)	24 (75)	25 (77)	25 (77)	25 (77)	24 (75)	24 (75)	24 (75)	24 (75)	23 (73)	24 (75)
Average precipitation mm (inches)	57 (2.2)	37 (1.5)	41 (1.6)	42 (1.7)	98 (3.9)	155 (6.1)	187 (7.4)	162 (6.4)	179 (7.0)	188 (7.4)	114 (4.5)	78 (3.1)	1,338 (52.8)
Average rainy days	12.0	7.7	9.2	10.2	19.5	24.6	26.9	25.1	25.5	25.2	18.0	13.0	216.9
Source: Meteoblue

== Demographics ==
Population census of Pulupandan
Year	Pop.	±% p.a.
1903	6,167	—
1918	5,268	−1.04%
1939	10,751	+3.46%
1948	11,726	+0.97%
1960	14,844	+1.98%
1970	19,476	+2.75%
1975	23,665	+3.98%
1980	24,824	+0.96%
1990	22,983	−0.77%
1995	24,932	+1.54%
2000	25,849	+0.78%
2007	27,072	+0.64%
2010	25,350	−2.36%
2015	27,735	+1.73%
2020	30,117	+1.75%
2024	31,942	+1.42%
Source: Philippine Statistics Authority

=== Languages ===
The people in the municipality speak Hiligaynon. Tagalog and English are generally understood.

=== Religion ===
Majority of the town are adherents of the Roman Catholic Church, followed secondly by the Philippine Independent Church.

== Economy ==
Poverty incidence of Pulupandan (%)

Source: Philippine Statistics Authority

== Culture ==
=== Salapan Festival ===
The Salapan Festival is an annual cultural celebration usually held in February. Its name is derived from the words “salap” and “pandan.” “Salap” is a local term for a fishnet, reflecting the town’s traditional guinamos production, while “pandan” refers both to the town’s name, Pulo sang Pandan (“Isle of Pandan”), and to the port (pantalan), which played a key role in the town’s economic development.

== Politics ==
The current mayor of Pulupandan is Miguel C. Peña, the son of former mayor Magdaleno "Magsie" Peña, who also served as mayor in the town of Moises Padilla.

Known for being a bailiwick of the Liberal Party, the town is notable for being the only municipality in Negros Occidental where Rodrigo Duterte won during the 2016 presidential election.

President Bongbong Marcos won by a landslide with a delivery vote of 89% (12,544 votes) in the 2022 Presidential election.

== Transportation ==
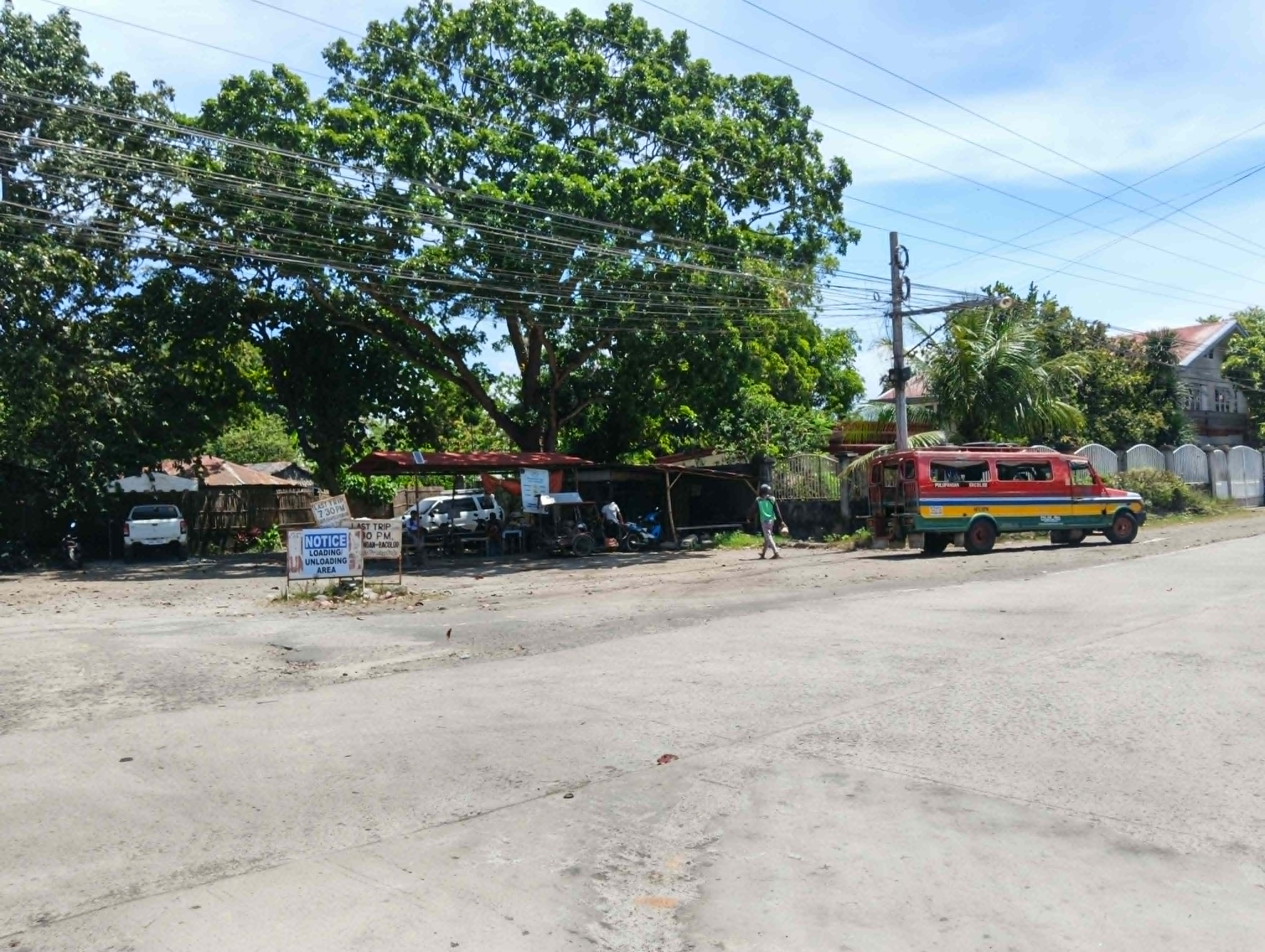
Pulupandan Jeepney Terminal

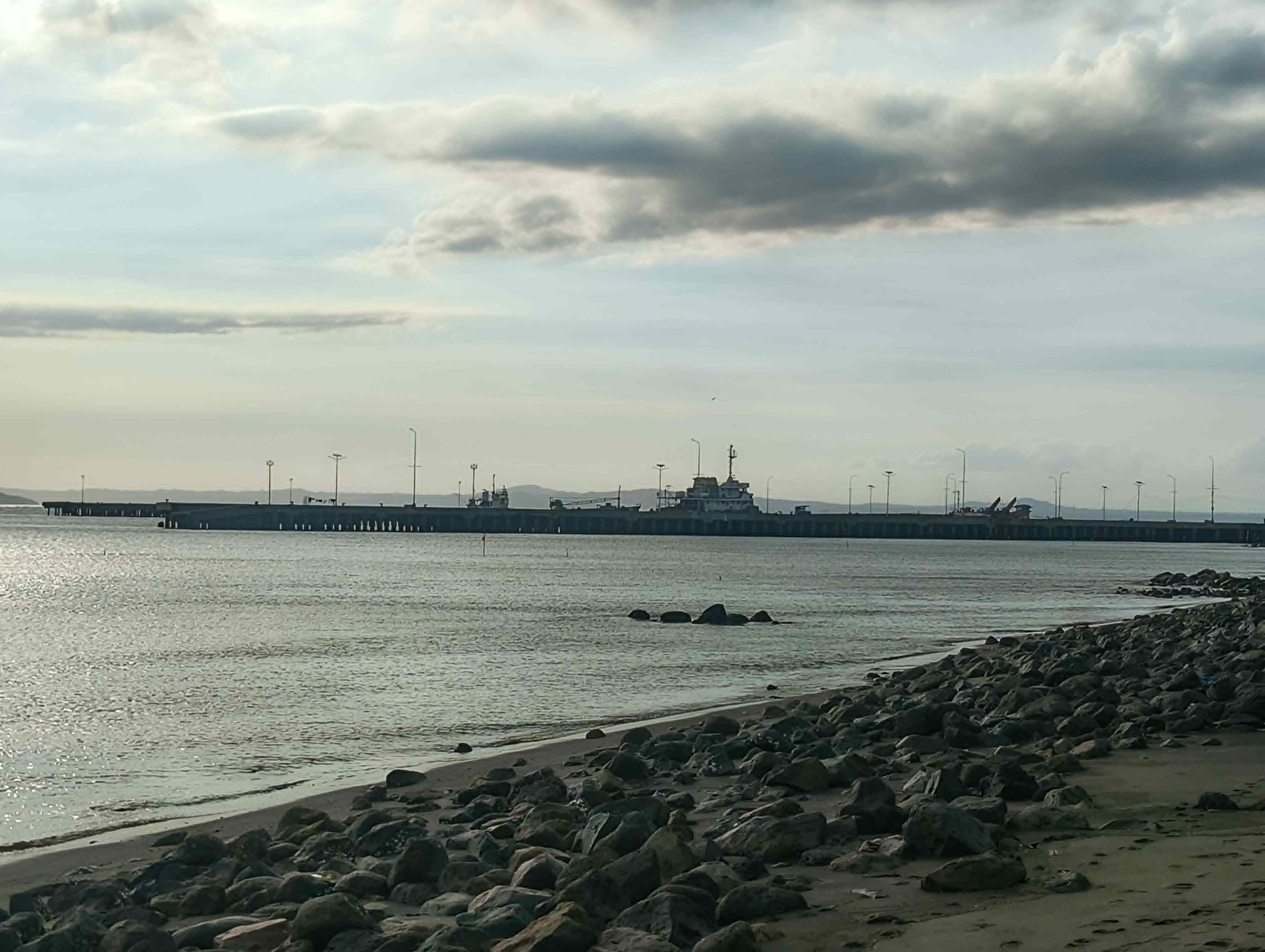
The Port of Pulupandan

Pulupandan can be accessed by jeepneys operated by the Pulupandan Transport Service Cooperative (PTSC), which regularly travel to and from Bacolod City. Transportation within Pulupandan is mainly done by tricycles. The town also has a seaport, with vessels traveling to the town of Sibunag in the island province of Guimaras.

== Notable personalities ==
- Maniya Barredo - Ballet Dancer, Prima Ballerina of the Philippines
- Agustín Montilla y Orendáin - Patriarch of Montilla clan, his descendants include Gil Montilla 4th Speaker of the House of Representatives of the Philippines and Soledad “Gretchen” Oppen-Cojuangco who has an estimated net worth of $1.15 billion and was ranked the 17th richest person in the Philippines by Forbes Magazine for 2025
- Lea Salonga - Actress, Singer, 1st Asian Actress to win a Tony Award , two time Grammy Award nominee
- Gerard Salonga - Classical Music Conductor, Composer
