= Potato Corner =

Philippine fast food franchise

- Current logo since 2023
- Product type: French fries outlet chain
- Current owner: Shakey's Pizza Asia Ventures Inc. (SPAVI)
- Country: Philippines
- Introduced: 1992; 34 years ago
- Markets: Southeast Asia, East Asia, Oceania, Saudi Arabia, North America, UAE, United Kingdom

Potato Corner is a Filipino fast food franchise which is known for its flavored french fries. It is owned by the same company behind Shakey's Pizza.

Potato Corner's first stall opened up in SM Megamall at Mandaluyong, on October 16, 1992 under Cinco Corporation. It expanded to 70 stores in the two years after it began franchising in 1993.

== History ==
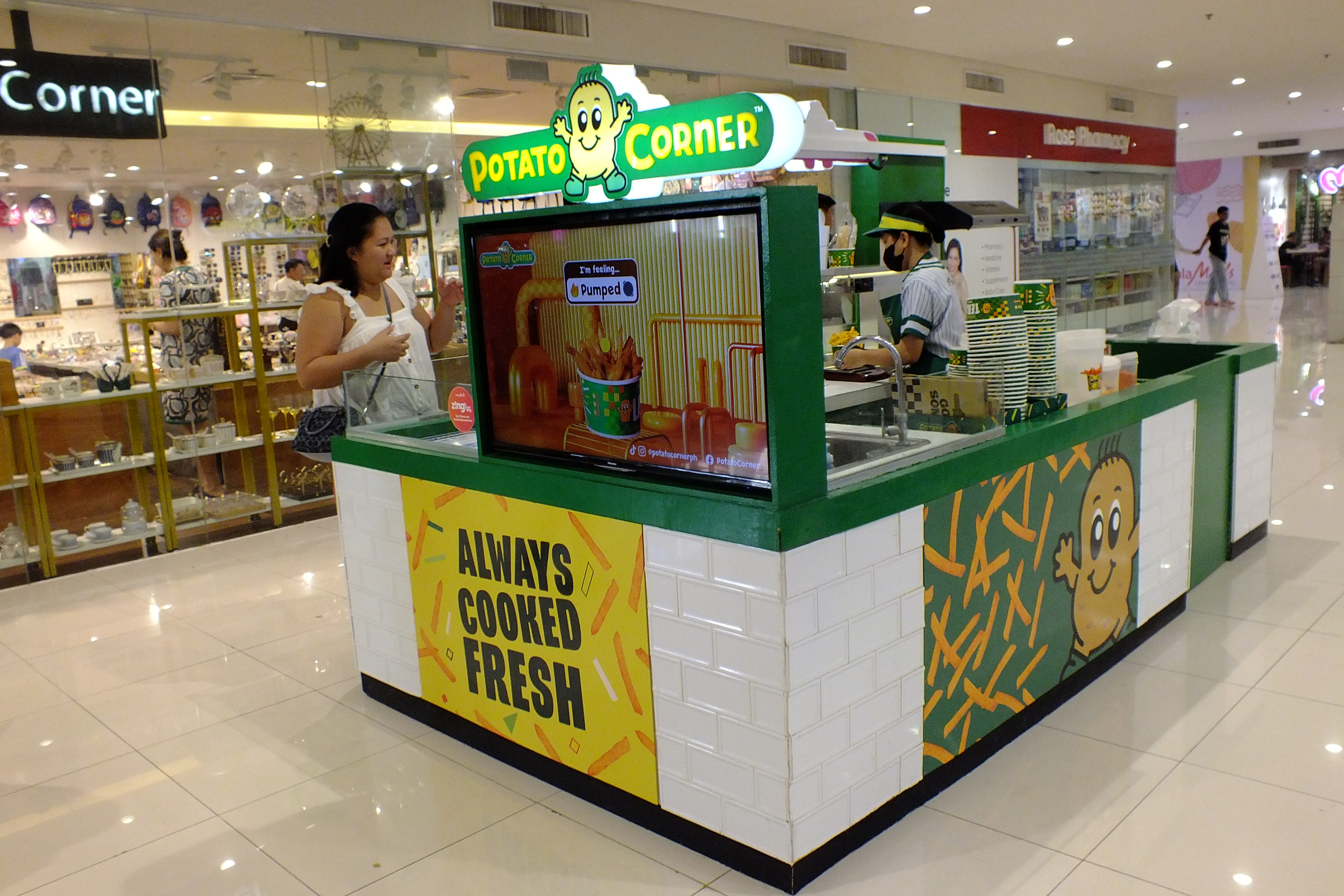
A Potato Corner outlet at Ayala Malls Central Bloc, Cebu City

Potato Corner was founded in 1992 by the partners Jose Magsaysay Jr., Ricardo Montelibano, Danilo Bermejo and Jorge Noel Wieneke III. Ricky Montelibano was the first person to sell flavored popcorn in the Philippines. Despite only selling two, powder-based flavors—barbecue and cheese—his business proved immensely popular. After meeting Montelibano in 1992, Wieneke, an advertising executive, came up with the idea of selling flavored french fries and won over his best friend, Danny Bermejo. Wieneke pitched the idea to Montelibano, who was enthusiastic. Finally, the group got Jose "Jomag" Magsaysay, Montelibano's brother-in-law and a nine-year Wendy's employee and manager, involved. Magsaysay's wages were not enough to support his family and the group needed someone with expertise in running a restaurant.

The four had to borrow the ₱150,000 that they needed in starting capital. On October 16, 1992, the first Potato Corner opened as a cart in Mandaluyong's SM Megamall. The first flavors available were cheese, barbecue, and sour cream. Wieneke was pleased when the cart received 300 orders its first day, far more than the expected 50. Within thirty days, all of them were able to pay back their loans.

Former logo used until 2023, but still used in their packaging.

After their initial success, they began to consider expanding through franchises. Magsaysay knew only the basics of franchising from his job at Wendy's and at the time it was a novel idea in the Philippines. As such, their first franchisee agreements were largely informal and their first franchisee signed a document they copied from online. The group raised funds for their expansion and quickly became large in the local market.

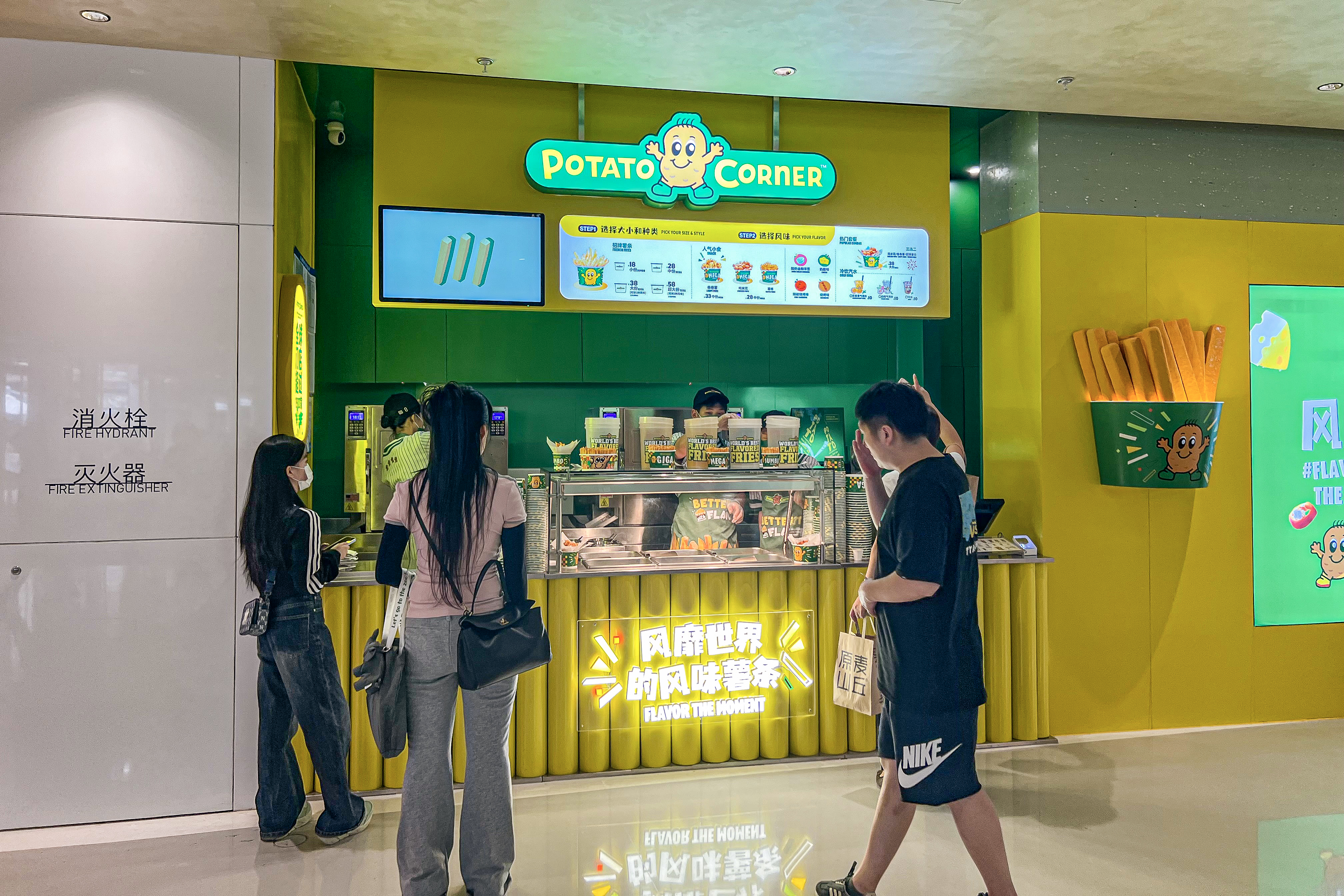
A Potato Corner outlet at Xibeiwang MIXC, Beijing, China

In 2006, Potato Corner opened its first international store in Indonesia. This was followed by Potato Corner's first entry in the United States in February 2010 and first store in the United States in 2012. In April 2017, Potato Corner opened its first Hong Kong franchise in Tsim Sha Tsui.

In 2021, Shakey's Pizza Asia Ventures Inc., the Philippine franchise of Shakey's Pizza, acquired Potato Corner; the acquisition deal was completed in 2022. In 2025, Potato Corner expanded to Taiwan. In December of the same year, the company launched an internal investigation following allegations that it opened company-owned stores in locations proposed by franchise applicants. Potato Corner denied the claims and stated that it does not intentionally disadvantage its franchisees.

== Location ==
Potato Corner is in 15 countries and territories as of 2025. 400 of its stores are overseas.

== Awards and recognition ==
Potato Corner garnered a number of accolades through the years. Potato Corner bagged the Best Franchisee of the Year for three consecutive years from PFA and DTI. Awarded by the same organizations, Potato Corner also received the Franchisee Excellence Hall of Fame Award in 2003 and the Global Filipino Franchise Award in 2017.

== Brand image ==
Potato Corner's official mascot, Poco (formerly Spudster), was introduced by the brand in 2009, and can be seen in all of its stores and buckets. Spudster received a Master License for Los Angeles County in 2009.
