= Katherine Luzuriaga =

American physician and pediatric immunologist

- Born: Bacolod, Philippines
- Education: Massachusetts Institute of Technology (BS); Massachusetts Institute of Technology (MS); Tufts University School of Medicine (MD)
- Occupation: Medical doctor
- Employer: University of Massachusetts Medical School
- Known for: HIV, AIDS research

Katherine Luzuriaga is an American physician and pediatric immunologist who primarily works on HIV/AIDS at the University of Massachusetts Medical School (UMMS). She is currently a vice provost at UMMS and the director of the UMass Center for Clinical and Translational Science.

== Early life and education ==
Luzuriaga was born in Bacolod and grew up in the Philippines; she was the second of six children. She majored in biochemistry and earned both her BSc and her MSc from the Massachusetts Institute of Technology. She earned her MD from Tufts before completing a pediatrics residency at Tufts Floating Children’s Hospital and fellowship training in adult and pediatric infectious diseases at the University of Massachusetts Medical School. She cites both her parents in her decision to become a medical doctor: her father was an engineer who taught her a love of science and math and her mother was a nurse.

== Career ==
In 1990, Luzuriaga joined the facility of UMMS. She has served as the division chief of pediatric infectious diseases and later became the founding director of the medical school's Office of Global Health. In 2012, she became the director for Center for Clinical and Translational Science, focusing on viral infections in children.

In 2021, Luzuriaga was in consideration to be named commissioner of the US Food and Drug Administration.

Luzuriaga has served as a consultant to the World Health Organization, as well as a member of the Institute of Medicine.

=== HIV/AIDS research ===
In 1991, Luzuriaga worked on the team performing pediatric clinical trials for the drug nevirapine; she and the team were the first to observe the suppression of HIV proliferation within infected cells.

In 2013, Luzuriaga contributed to a trial that "functionally cured" a newborn of AIDS that had been transmitted from the mother during birth. Working alongside Dr. Deborah Persaud, the team demonstrated that a two-year old treated with antiretroviral drugs "no longer has detectable levels of virus using conventional testing despite not taking HIV medication for 10 months".

=== COVID-19 ===
In 2021, Luzuriaga headed up a study at UMMS testing the efficacy and safety of the COVID-19 vaccination in children aged 6 months to 11 years old. Luzuriaga was the principal investigator for the study, called KidCOVE.

In 2022, Luzuriaga led a study testing the efficacy and safety of paxlovid in children aged 6–12. Luzuriaga described having a medication against COVID-19 in kids was "crucial".

== Awards and honors ==
In 1997, Luzuriaga was awarded the Elizabeth Glaser Scientist Award from the Elizabeth Glaser Pediatric AIDS Foundation.

In April 2013, Luzuriaga was included on Time Magazine's list of the 100 Most Influential People in the World for her work on preventing AIDS from being transmitted to newborn babies.

In December 2013, Luzuriaga was named to the list of Foreign Policy's 100 Leading Global Thinkers of 2013 for “bringing the world closer to a cure for HIV.”
