= Eduardo Sicangco =

Filipino-born American stage designer, and illustrator

Eduardo Varela Sicangco (Nicknamed Toto) was a scenic designer, costume designer, and illustrator for Broadway, opera, musical theatre, ballet, film, television, arena spectaculars, cruise ships, and circuses. He is best known for his glitz and glamour on the stages he designed for with sets gilded with gold leaf and color and costumes of showgirls with rhinestones and glitter. His work was widely recognized and has been included in the Lynn Pecktal book Costume Design: Techniques of Modern Masters. He was the subject of “From Inspiration to Illusion, the Scenographic Works of Eduardo Sicangco,” a career retrospective at the Ayala Museum in the Philippines, where he was born.

== Career ==
Eduardo Varela Sicangco was born in Bacolod, Negros Occidental. He was a student of National Artist Salvador Bernal at the Ateneo de Manila University. He later became Bernal’s protégé at the Cultural Center of the Philippines where Sicangco designed Le Carnaval for Ballet Philippines. Upon finishing an MFA in stage design at New York University, Tisch School of the Arts, he was given the J.S. Seidman Award for Excellence in Design. Sicangco was a Master Teacher of Design at NYU until 2004. He went on from teaching at NYU to teach set design and costume design at University of North Carolina School of the Arts from 2004-2023. He has thirty-two years of scenographic work in American theaters and various international design. Sicangco passed while serving as a professor at UNCSA in 2023.

- Design credits include "Cavalleria Rusticana," "Pagliacci" and "Carmen" for New York City Opera; "Babes in Toyland" for Houston Grand Opera; "Manon," "La Traviata" and "Elisir d’ Amore" for Virginia Opera; Donald Byrd’s "The Harlem Nutcracker" and "The Gershwin Celebration" for Brooklyn Academy of Music and PBS; "The Spring Spectacular" for Radio City Music Hall; "Gentlemen Prefer Blondes" on Broadway; "Das Barbecu" Off Broadway; and five editions of Ringling Brothers & Barnum & Bailey Circus
- Sicangco returned to his home of the Philippines during his career to design the scenery for a production of "Swan Lake" for a Ballet Philippines production which features over 5,000 sheets of gold leaf, a glitz that he was known for.
