= Elsa Martinez Coscolluela =

Filipina writer

Elsa Martinez De Coscolluela is a Filipina poet, short-story writer, and playwright from Bacolod. She is married to Jose Orlando H. Coscolluela and has three sons, Jose Orlando Jr, John Paul Rupert, and Jacques Oscar Celerino. She finished her AB and MA for Creative Writing at the Silliman University, a school noted for training writers in the Philippines, and also a doctorate in Language and Literature from the De La Salle University.

Her career as a poet lasted between 1965 and 1973 and these poems are published in a book entitled "Katipunera and Other Poems" published in 1998. In 1973 she focused her writing efforts to writing plays and also to pursue an academic career. Her best known play that earned her great acclaim as a playwright is "In My Father's House" which staged production both in the University of the Philippines and the Cultural Center of the Philippines in the year 1988. This play was also the official Philippine entry to the Association of South East Asian Nations (ASEAN) Drama Festival held in Singapore in 1989. In My Father's House was also staged in New York, San Francisco, Kyoto, and the Philippines.

As an academician she held the position of Vice President for Academic Affairs at the University of St. La Salle in Bacolod and also manages annual Negros Summer Workshops for artists and writers with Peque Gallaga since 1991. She first started teaching in St. Paul University Dumaguete as an English and Literature Professor and school paper adviser "The Paulinian".

She is also a multi-awarded writer. Her achievements include winning the Carlos Palanca Memorial Awards for more than twenty times, the prestigious Cultural Center Award in playwrighting, as well as the Philippine Free Press Award. In 1996 she was named National Fellow for Drama by the University of the Philippines Creative Writing Center.

In 1999 she was instilled as a Hall of Famer in the Palanca Awards. In 2004 Outstanding Paulinian in the field of Literature during the 100 centennial celebration of St. Paul University Dumaguete. In 2015 Outstanding Negrense in the field of Education and in 2016 Outstanding Pinili Heritage Award in the field of Literature & Education.

Elsa Coscolluela is the only Filipina dramatist in Palanca's Hall of Fame. She has started as a poet, she wrote under Edith Tiempo and David Quemada. These poems are printed by her brother in two volumes, "Brown Glass" (1969), and "Becoming and other" (1970).

She says that she's grateful for the training and exposure in poetry which has given her "depth and texture" to the way she writes plays. She considers poems as a preparation for plays, because it is pure and concise. She believes that poetry is strict in a way because it puts great ideas to tiny verses.

At first she thought her poems to be seriously flawed and heavy-handed but soon discovered that poems worked out for themselves out in her mind and then become something else, something that is new again. That is why she submitted her collection to the Palanca Literary Contests, her collection "In Time Being and Other Poems" won second prize in 1993, and "Katipunera" won first prize in 1995. "Katipunera" also won in the Free Press Poetry Contest in 1996.

However, Coscolluela is best known in the field of drama having won sixteen Palancas in that genre. Her best known play "In My Father's House" was first produced onstage in 1988, and submitted as an entry in the ASEAN Drama Festival in Singapore, 1989. The play popularity is not only in the Philippines, it has been restaged in San Francisco, New York City, and Kyoto.

== Sa Tahanan ng Aking Ama, 2010 ==
In My Father's House was also staged at the Ateneo de Manila University in January 2010 as Sa Tahanan ng Aking Ama, produced by ENTABLADO (ENterteynment para sa TAo, Bayan, LAnsangan at DiyOs, Eng. Entertainment for the People, Country, Street, and God), the socio-political theater organization of the university, in line with its 27th* season: Taon ng Pagbanyuhay. It was co-directed by Dr. Jerry Respeto and Jethro Nino Tenorio, both members of the faculty of Filipino Department, the former being the Department Chair. The play was translated into the Filipino language by Dr. Jerry Respeto. Sa Tahanan ng Aking Ama is the first production made by ENTABLADO in years that showcases heavy drama.
