= Gil Montilla =

Speaker of the House of Representatives of the Philippines from 1935 to 1938

The Honorable Gil Montilla
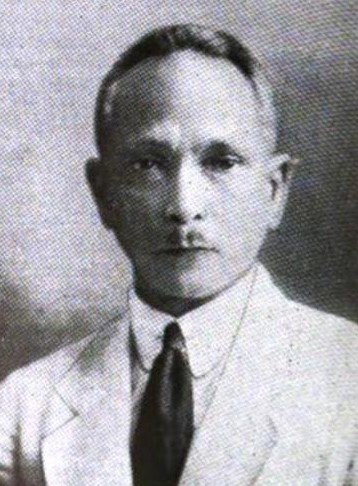
- Senatorial portrait of Montilla, published by Benipayo Press, c. 1935

4th Speaker of the National Assembly of the Philippines
- In office November 25, 1935 – December 30, 1938
- Preceded by: Quintin Paredes
- Succeeded by: Jose Yulo

Member of the Philippine National Assembly from Negros Occidental's 3rd district
- In office November 15, 1935 – 1938
- Preceded by: Ramon Agustin
- Succeeded by: Jose Yulo

Senator of the Philippines from the 8th district
- In office 1931–1935 Serving with Francisco Zulueta (1931-1934); Isaac Lacson (1934-1935)
- Preceded by: Hermenegildo Villanueva
- Succeeded by: Position abolished

9th Governor of Negros Occidental
- In office October 16, 1922 – October 15, 1925
- Preceded by: Matias Hilado
- Succeeded by: José Locsin

Member of the Philippine House of Representatives from Negros Occidental's 3rd district
- In office 1912–1919
- Preceded by: Rafael Ramos
- Succeeded by: Tito Silverio

Member of the Philippine National Assembly from Negros Occidental's at-large district
- In office September 25, 1943 – February 2, 1944 Serving with Vicente F. Gustilo

Personal details
- Born: Gil Montilla y Miranda; September 11, 1876 Hinigaran, Negros, Captaincy General of the Philippines
- Died: July 20, 1946 (aged 69) Bacolod, Negros Occidental, Philippines
- Party: Nacionalista
- Other political affiliations: KALIBAPI (1942–1945)
- Spouse: Mercedes Miranda
- Children: Mercedes

Gil Miranda Montilla (September 11, 1876 – July 20, 1946) was a Filipino politician and businessman who served as speaker of the National Assembly from 1935 to 1938, and a member of the Philippine Senate from 1931 to 1935.

== Early life ==
Montilla was born on September 11, 1876, in Hinigaran, Negros Occidental, to Domingo Montilla and Potenciana Miranda. He received his bachelor's degree from the Ateneo de Manila in 1896 and studied law at the University of Santo Tomas.

During the Philippine Revolution, he joined the revolutionary forces in Negros as a battalion commander in Binalbagan and Pulupandan. During the American occupation, he worked in Binalbagan as a teacher, subsequently becoming the town's secretary and president. He also engaged in business as a sugar planter and president of the Isabela Sugar Company.

== National politics ==
Montilla was elected as representative to the Philippine Assembly, for the 3rd district of Negros Occidental from 1912 to 1919. He then served as governor of Negros Occidental; and Senator from the Eighth Senatorial District comprising Negros Occidental, Negros Oriental, Antique and Palawan from 1931 to 1935. In 1935, he was elected as a member of the Commonwealth National Assembly from the 3rd District of Negros Occidental and was elected as the first Speaker of the Assembly, serving until 1938. He was then appointed by President Manuel Quezon to become head of the Philippine Sugar Administration. He later served as President of Quezon's Nacionalista Party.

== Personal life and death ==
Montilla was married to Mercedes Miranda. He died on 20 June 1946. His daughter, Mercedes Montilla, was a "Miss Philippines" recipient at the Manila Carnival in 1936, and later became mayor of Sipalay, Negros Occidental in December 1963.

== Legacy ==
A barangay and high school in Sipalay is named after him.

== See also ==
- Politics of the Philippines
