= Jocelle Batapa-Sigue =

Filipino politician

The Honorable Jocelle Batapa-Sigue

Undersecretary for Informations and Communications Technology Industry Development
- In office August 4, 2022 – May 25, 2025
- Secretary: Ivan John Uy; Paul Joseph Mercado; Henry Aguda

Member of the Bacolod City Council's at-large district
- In office June 30, 2004 – June 30, 2010
- In office June 30, 2013 – June 30, 2016

Personal details
- Born: Jocelle Batapa; December 14, 1972 (age 53) Bacolod, Negros Occidental, Philippines
- Spouse: Arnel Sigue
- Education: University of Negros Occidental – Recoletos; University of St. La Salle
- Occupation: Politician; lawyer; civil servant
- Website: jocellebatapasigue.com

Jocelle Batapa-Sigue (born December 14, 1972) is a Filipino lawyer, technology advocate, and former politician, who served as Undersecretary for Informations and Communications Technology Industry Development of the Department of Information and Communications Technology from August 4, 2022 until May 25, 2025. She previously served as a member of the Bacolod City Council. She is the founding chairperson of the Bacolod – Negros Occidental Federation for Information and Communications Technology, one of the founding organizations of the National ICT Confederation of the Philippines where she became president from 2010-2012.

== Political career ==
=== Member of the Bacolod City Council ===
Batapa-Sigue first ran for office as a member of the Bacolod City Council in 2001 but lost the race. However, in the 2004 local elections, she was finally elected into the city council where she headed the nascent committee that eventually became the committee on information and communications technology, where she facilitated the start of the ICT-BPO industry in Bacolod. She led the Bacolod City Gender and Development Council, extending her women empowerment and protection advocacy in public service.

She was recognized in 2016 as one of The Outstanding Women in the Nation's Service (TOWNS), alongside then Olympic silver medalist Hidilyn Diaz, for her work in growing the ICT industry not just in Bacolod, but also the other parts of the Philippines.

=== Candidacies for Representative and Mayor ===
In 2010, despite being qualified for another term as member of the city council, Batapa-Sigue filed her candidacy as an independent candidate for representative of the Lone District of Bacolod where she lost to businessman and physician Anthony Golez, Jr. Meanwhile, in 2019, she came out as a surprise candidate for Mayor of Bacolod under the MKK coalition slate, led by former Rep. Monico Puentevella, with former Vice Mayor Thaddy Sayson as runningmate. She lost to then incumbent mayor Bing Leonardia.

== Other involvements ==
Before entering public service, she worked as a local reporter and news writer for the Bacolod stations of GMA Network in 1990 and then ABS-CBN Regional, while she studied law as one of the pioneer law students of the University of St. La Salle, passing the bar in the 1997 bar examination and inducted to the Roll of Attorneys in May 7, 1998.

Batapa-Sigue worked as gender rights advocate, former in-house counsel of the Victorias Milling Company, and professor at the University of St. La Salle College of Law since 1998. She was granted fellowship in two international leadership institutions, the Hawaii-based Haggai Institute for Advanced Leadership and the Einsenhower Fellowships. Upon retirement from elected office in 2016, she became the chief consultant for ICT development programs by the late Gov. Alfredo Marañon, Jr.

During the early months of the COVID-19 pandemic, in May 2020, Batapa-Sigue initiated the barter movement as a way to acquire scarce resource and food products as people found themselves without jobs and salaries.

Prior to her appointment to the Department of Information and Communications Technology, she was Consultant for Digital Transformation in the office of Sen. Sonny Angara.

She has been the lead convener of the Philippine ICT Innovation Network, a national alliance of ICT organizations, since 2016.

== Awards and citations ==
From 2002 to present, Batapa-Sigue has been given awards for services in public service and private advocacies. Prominent local and international awards include the ff.:

- 2020 ITU WSIS Best Practice by Civil Society Organization: Global Barter Communities
- 2018 AVPN-BMW Foundation Policy Leadership Fellow (Asian Venture Philanthropy Network, Singapore)
- 2016 The Outstanding Women in Nation’s Service (TOWNS) Awardee for Information and Communications Technology (ICT) Philippines
- 2013 Philippine Individual ICT Contributor of the Year (Canadian Chamber of Commerce in the Philippines and IT-Business Process Association of the Philippines)
- 2012 Finalist, Individual ICT Contributor Awards Awarded by the Canadian Chamber of Commerce in the Philippines and IT-Business Process Association of the Philippines (IBPAP)
- 2012 Eisenhower Fellow for ICT, ICT Startups, Animation and Game Development and Health Care Information Management
- 2009 Top Ten Outstanding Young Leaders (Asia Society Foundation)
- 2007 Go Negosyo - Best Government Support for Business (Philippine Center for Entrepreneurship) as Proponent & Chair of the Bacolod Information Technology (IT) Focus Team
- 2007 Ten Outstanding Councilors of the Philippines (TOCP) Top 20 Finalist
