= 2025 Philippine local elections in the Negros Island Region =

- May 12, 2025
- Gubernatorial elections
- 3 provincial governors and 1 city mayor
Party	Seats
NPC	2
PFP	2
This lists parties that won seats. See the complete results below.
- Vice gubernatorial elections
- 3 provincial vice governors and 1 city vice mayor
Party	Seats
PFP	2
NPC	1
NUP	1
This lists parties that won seats. See the complete results below.
- Provincial Board elections
- 30 provincial board members and 12 city councilors
Party	Seats
PFP	20
NPC	12
NUP	4
UNegA	2
Nacionalista	1
Independent	3
This lists parties that won seats. See the complete results below.

The 2025 Philippine local elections in the Negros Island Region were held on May 12, 2025.

== Summary ==
=== Governors ===
Province/city	Incumbent	Incumbent's party	Winner	Winner's party	Winning margin
Bacolod (HUC)	Albee Benitez	Independent	Greg Gasataya	NPC	4.60%
Negros Occidental	Eugenio Jose Lacson	NPC	Eugenio Jose Lacson	NPC	81.20%
Negros Oriental	Chaco Sagarbarria	PFP	Chaco Sagarbarria	PFP	15.88%
Siquijor	Jake Vincent Villa	PFP	Jake Vincent Villa	PFP	15.98%

=== Vice governors ===
Province/city	Incumbent	Incumbent's party	Winner	Winner's party	Winning margin
Bacolod (HUC)	El Cid Familiaran	Lakas	Kalaw Puentevilla	NPC	4.62%
Negros Occidental	Jeffrey Ferrer	NUP	Joeben Alonso	NUP	66.04%
Negros Oriental	Jaime Reyes	Independent	Fritz Diaz	PFP	13.98%
Siquijor	Mimi Quezon	Aksyon	Dindo Tumala	PFP	15.20%

=== Provincial boards ===
Province/city	Seats	Party control		Composition
Province/city	Seats	Previous	Result	Composition
Bacolod (HUC)	12 elected 2 ex-officio	No majority	NPC	NPC (9); Independent (3)
Negros Occidental	12 elected 3 ex-officio	No majority	No majority	NUP (4); NPC (3); PFP (2); UNegA (2); Nacionalista (1)
Negros Oriental	10 elected 3 ex-officio	No majority	PFP	PFP (10)
Siquijor	8 elected 3 ex-officio	PDP–Laban	PFP	PFP (8)

== Bacolod ==
=== Mayor ===
Incumbent Mayor Albee Benitez ran for the House of Representatives in Bacolod's lone legislative district as an independent. He was previously affiliated with PDP–Laban.

Benitez endorsed representative Greg Gasataya (Nationalist People's Coalition), who won the election against Bacolod vice mayor El Cid Familiaran (Lakas–CMD).

Candidate	Party	Votes	%
Greg Gasataya	Nationalist People's Coalition	157,150	52.30
El Cid Familiaran	Lakas-CMD	143,307	47.70
Total		300,457	100.00
Valid votes		300,457	97.11
Invalid/blank votes		8,956	2.89
Total votes		309,413	100.00
Registered voters/turnout		355,880	86.94
NPC gain from Independent			
Source: Commission on Elections

=== Vice Mayor ===
Term-limited incumbent Vice Mayor El Cid Familiaran of Lakas–CMD ran for mayor of Bacolod. He was previously affiliated with the Nacionalista Party.

Familiaran endorsed city councilor Enoy Novero, an independent, who was defeated by city councilor Kalaw Puentevella of the Nationalist People's Coalition.

Candidate	Party	Votes	%
Kalaw Puentevella	Nationalist People's Coalition	146,639	52.31
Enoy Novero	Independent	133,706	47.69
Total		280,345	100.00
Valid votes		280,345	90.61
Invalid/blank votes		29,068	9.39
Total votes		309,413	100.00
Registered voters/turnout		355,880	86.94
NPC gain from Lakas			
Source: Commission on Elections

=== City Council ===
The Bacolod City Council consists of 14 councilors, 12 of whom are elected.

28 candidates were included in the ballot.

The Nationalist People's Coalition won nine seats, gaining a majority in the city council.

Party	Votes	%	Seats	+/–
Nationalist People's Coalition	1,364,539	55.50	9	+7
Akbayan	65,536	2.67	0	New
Bayan Muna	35,128	1.43	0	New
Independent	993,617	40.41	3	+2
Total	2,458,820	100.00	12	0
Total votes	309,413	–		
Registered voters/turnout	355,880	86.94		
Source: Commission on Elections

Candidate	Party	Votes	%
Caesar Distrito	Nationalist People's Coalition	153,377	6.24
Israel Salanga (incumbent)	Nationalist People's Coalition	149,906	6.10
Em Ang (incumbent)	Nationalist People's Coalition	146,548	5.96
Thaddy Sayson (incumbent)	Nationalist People's Coalition	144,827	5.89
Jason Villarosa (incumbent)	Nationalist People's Coalition	137,623	5.60
Celia Flor (incumbent)	Independent	122,669	4.99
Dindo Ramos	Independent	121,382	4.94
Bobby Rojas	Nationalist People's Coalition	121,233	4.93
Wilson Gamboa Jr.	Independent	120,784	4.91
Pao Sy (incumbent)	Nationalist People's Coalition	119,610	4.86
Homer Bais	Nationalist People's Coalition	118,957	4.84
Al Victor Espino (incumbent)	Nationalist People's Coalition	113,441	4.61
Vladi Gonzalez (incumbent)	Nationalist People's Coalition	104,676	4.26
Archie Baribar	Independent	101,049	4.11
Ana Marie Palermo	Independent	87,555	3.56
Bebeng Noble	Independent	73,836	3.00
Beboy Yap	Independent	68,439	2.78
Lindy de Leon	Independent	67,746	2.76
Ken Paolo Gilo	Akbayan	65,536	2.67
Bebe Yulo	Independent	56,183	2.28
Marlon Solidum	Nationalist People's Coalition	54,341	2.21
Lilian Sembrano	Independent	47,130	1.92
Rico Villafuerte	Independent	44,501	1.81
Christian Weber	Independent	39,007	1.59
Pepito Pico	Bayan Muna	35,128	1.43
Kenneth Ian Belario	Independent	15,315	0.62
Maria Ella Dapiton	Independent	14,101	0.57
Abem Cañal	Independent	13,920	0.57
Total		2,458,820	100.00
Total votes		309,413	–
Registered voters/turnout		355,880	86.94
Source: Commission on Elections

== Negros Occidental ==
=== Governor ===
Incumbent Governor Eugenio Jose Lacson of the Nationalist People's Coalition ran for a third term.

Lacson won re-election against former Victorias mayor Wantan Palanca (PDP–Laban), and three other candidates.

Candidate	Party	Votes	%
Eugenio Jose Lacson (incumbent)	Nationalist People's Coalition	911,614	87.71
Wantan Palanca	PDP–Laban	67,694	6.51
Ferdenand Diego	Independent	24,116	2.32
Toto Librando	Independent	22,379	2.15
J. Paul Octaviano	Partido Lakas ng Masa	13,589	1.31
Total		1,039,392	100.00
Valid votes		1,039,392	75.89
Invalid/blank votes		330,240	24.11
Total votes		1,369,632	100.00
Registered voters/turnout		1,645,852	83.22
NPC hold			
Source: Commission on Elections

=== Vice Governor ===
Incumbent Vice Governor Jeffrey Ferrer of the National Unity Party (NUP) ran for the House of Representatives in Negros Occidental's 4th legislative district.

The NUP nominated provincial board member Joeben Alonso, who won the election against Rosemarie Jaro Dreyfus (Partido Lakas ng Masa).

Candidate	Party	Votes	%
Joeben Alonso	National Unity Party	680,339	83.02
Rosemarie Jaro Dreyfus	Partido Lakas ng Masa	139,159	16.98
Total		819,498	100.00
Valid votes		819,498	59.83
Invalid/blank votes		550,134	40.17
Total votes		1,369,632	100.00
Registered voters/turnout		1,645,852	83.22
NUP hold			
Source: Commission on Elections

=== Provincial Board ===
The Negros Occidental Provincial Board is composed of 15 board members, 12 of whom are elected.

The National Unity Party won four seats, becoming the largest party in the provincial board.

Party	Votes	%	Seats	+/–
Nationalist People's Coalition	395,028	24.25	3	–4
National Unity Party	391,866	24.05	4	+3
Partido Federal ng Pilipinas	388,854	23.87	2	New
United Negros Alliance	173,306	10.64	2	0
Nacionalista Party	91,012	5.59	1	New
Lakas–CMD	87,885	5.39	0	0
PDP–Laban	19,517	1.20	0	–1
Independent	81,686	5.01	0	–1
Total	1,629,154	100.00	12	0
Total votes	1,369,632	–		
Registered voters/turnout	1,645,852	83.22		
Source: Commission on Elections

==== 1st district ====
Negros Occidental's 1st provincial district consists of the same area as Negros Occidental's 1st legislative district. Two board members are elected from this provincial district.

Two candidates were included in the ballot.

Candidate	Party	Votes	%
Macmac dela Cruz	National Unity Party	107,511	51.63
Araceli Somosa (incumbent)	Nationalist People's Coalition	100,738	48.37
Total		208,249	100.00
Total votes		213,397	–
Registered voters/turnout		257,408	82.90
Source: Commission on Elections

==== 2nd district ====
Negros Occidental's 2nd provincial district consists of the same area as Negros Occidental's 2nd legislative district. Two board members are elected from this provincial district.

Two candidates were included in the ballot.

Candidate	Party	Votes	%
Atoy Marañon	National Unity Party	91,459	52.38
Pal Guanzon	United Negros Alliance	83,134	47.62
Total		174,593	100.00
Total votes		166,298	–
Registered voters/turnout		212,207	78.37
Source: Commission on Elections

==== 3rd district ====
Negros Occidental's 3rd provincial district consists of the same area as Negros Occidental's 3rd legislative district. Two board members are elected from this provincial district.

Four candidates were included in the ballot.

Candidate	Party	Votes	%
Andrew Montelibano	Partido Federal ng Pilipinas	128,156	39.78
Bambi Depasucat	Partido Federal ng Pilipinas	102,374	31.78
Rolin Meliton	Lakas–CMD	87,885	27.28
Tukoy Occida	Independent	3,767	1.17
Total		322,182	100.00
Total votes		268,096	–
Registered voters/turnout		317,481	84.44
Source: Commission on Elections

==== 4th district ====
Negros Occidental's 4th provincial district consists of the same area as Negros Occidental's 4th legislative district. Two board members are elected from this provincial district.

Four candidates were included in the ballot.

Candidate	Party	Votes	%
Paula Alonso	National Unity Party	109,142	38.99
Nikko Yulo	National Unity Party	83,754	29.92
Leo Carlo Delfinado	Partido Federal ng Pilipinas	82,183	29.36
Angelo Quitco	Independent	4,863	1.74
Total		279,942	100.00
Total votes		213,901	–
Registered voters/turnout		247,306	86.49
Source: Commission on Elections

==== 5th district ====
Negros Occidental's 5th provincial district consists of the same area as Negros Occidental's 5th legislative district. Two board members are elected from this provincial district.

Six candidates were included in the ballot.

Candidate	Party	Votes	%
Hadji Trojillo	Nacionalista Party	91,012	27.69
Rita Gatuslao	United Negros Alliance	90,172	27.43
Kareem Feria	Nationalist People's Coalition	54,144	16.47
Aly Tongson Jr.	Partido Federal ng Pilipinas	47,383	14.41
Cherrie Hope Belarga	Partido Federal ng Pilipinas	28,758	8.75
Patrick Montilla	Independent	17,255	5.25
Total		328,724	100.00
Total votes		255,400	–
Registered voters/turnout		301,233	84.78
Source: Commission on Elections

==== 6th district ====
Negros Occidental's 6th provincial district consists of the same area as Negros Occidental's 6th legislative district. Two board members are elected from this provincial district.

Five candidates were included in the ballot.

Candidate	Party	Votes	%
Ralph Alvarez	Nationalist People's Coalition	137,948	43.73
Jeffrey Tubola	Nationalist People's Coalition	102,198	32.40
Chad Zayco	Independent	42,524	13.48
Michael Legaspi	PDP–Laban	19,517	6.19
Anton Raymund Agbay	Independent	13,277	4.21
Total		315,464	100.00
Total votes		252,540	–
Registered voters/turnout		310,217	81.41
Source: Commission on Elections

== Negros Oriental ==
=== Governor ===
Incumbent Governor Chaco Sagarbarria of the Partido Federal ng Pilipinas ran for a full term. He became governor on May 31, 2023, after Guido Reyes died.

Sagarbarria won re-election against former Negros Oriental governor Pryde Henry Teves (Liberal Party), and four other candidates.

Candidate	Party	Votes	%
Chaco Sagarbarria (incumbent)	Partido Federal ng Pilipinas	365,020	52.41
Pryde Henry Teves	Liberal Party	254,415	36.53
Joh Jaos	Independent	36,189	5.20
Glendol Badon	Independent	30,144	4.33
Alex Larita	Independent	6,772	0.97
Stephen Tuballa	Independent	3,897	0.56
Total		696,437	100.00
Valid votes		696,437	83.71
Invalid/blank votes		135,527	16.29
Total votes		831,964	100.00
Registered voters/turnout		976,185	85.23
PFP hold			
Source: Commission on Elections

=== Vice Governor ===
Incumbent Vice Governor Jaime Reyes ran for a full term as an independent. He became vice governor on May 31, 2023, after Chaco Sagarbarria became governor upon Guido Reyes' death.

Reyes was defeated by Siaton mayor Fritz Diaz of the Partido Federal ng Pilipinas. Erwin Vergara (Independent) also ran for vice governor.

Candidate	Party	Votes	%
Fritz Diaz	Partido Federal ng Pilipinas	280,725	47.08
Jaime Reyes (incumbent)	Independent	197,354	33.10
Erwin Vergara	Independent	118,151	19.82
Total		596,230	100.00
Valid votes		596,230	71.67
Invalid/blank votes		235,734	28.33
Total votes		831,964	100.00
Registered voters/turnout		976,185	85.23
PFP gain from Independent			
Source: Commission on Elections

=== Provincial Board ===
The Negros Oriental Provincial Board consists of 13 board members, 10 of whom are elected.

The Partido Federal ng Pilipinas won 10 seats, gaining a majority in the provincial board.

Party	Votes	%	Seats	+/–
Partido Federal ng Pilipinas	1,015,358	65.68	10	New
Liberal Party	288,475	18.66	0	–2
PROMDI	107,876	6.98	0	0
Independent	134,108	8.68	0	–1
Total	1,545,817	100.00	10	0
Total votes	831,964	–		
Registered voters/turnout	976,185	85.23		
Source: Commission on Elections

==== 1st district ====
Negros Oriental's 1st provincial district consists of the same area as Negros Oriental's 1st legislative district. Three board members are elected from this district.

Eight candidates were included in the ballot.

Candidate	Party	Votes	%
Angel Amador	Partido Federal ng Pilipinas	78,415	18.22
Ikay Villanueva (incumbent)	Partido Federal ng Pilipinas	76,899	17.87
Rusty Serion	Partido Federal ng Pilipinas	76,540	17.78
Rico Mijares	PROMDI	74,684	17.35
Carlisle Reyes	Liberal Party	68,592	15.94
Angelito Carriaga	PROMDI	33,192	7.71
Eric Jabel	Liberal Party	15,110	3.51
Tanie Villahermosa	Independent	7,010	1.63
Total		430,442	100.00
Total votes		253,171	–
Registered voters/turnout		292,029	86.69
Source: Commission on Elections

==== 2nd district ====
Negros Oriental's 2nd provincial district consists of the same area as Negros Oriental's 2nd legislative district. Four board members are elected from this district.

Eight candidates were included in the ballot.

Candidate	Party	Votes	%
Nyrth Christian Degamo (incumbent)	Partido Federal ng Pilipinas	166,138	22.61
Erwin Macias	Partido Federal ng Pilipinas	138,565	18.86
Woodrow Maquiling Sr. (incumbent)	Partido Federal ng Pilipinas	130,700	17.79
Apolinario Arnaiz Jr.(incumbent)	Partido Federal ng Pilipinas	109,676	14.92
Karen Villanueva	Liberal Party	83,665	11.38
Jose Baldado	Liberal Party	70,517	9.60
Nichol Elman	Independent	19,238	2.62
Franklin Culanag	Independent	16,389	2.23
Total		734,888	100.00
Total votes		322,403	–
Registered voters/turnout		375,249	85.92
Source: Commission on Elections

==== 3rd district ====
Negros Oriental's 3rd provincial district consists of the same area as Negros Oriental's 3rd legislative district. Three board members are elected from this district.

Six candidates were included in the ballot.

Candidate	Party	Votes	%
Popoy Renacia (incumbent)	Partido Federal ng Pilipinas	94,294	24.78
Bobot Adanza	Partido Federal ng Pilipinas	83,511	21.95
Carlo Remontal (incumbent)	Partido Federal ng Pilipinas	60,620	15.93
Alex Elnar	Independent	52,542	13.81
Elvis Tinguha	Liberal Party	50,591	13.30
Johanna Dawn Aurea	Independent	38,929	10.23
Total		380,487	100.00
Total votes		256,390	–
Registered voters/turnout		308,907	83.00
Source: Commission on Elections

== Siquijor ==
=== Governor ===
Incumbent Governor Jake Vincent Villa of the Partido Federal ng Pilipinas ran for a second term. He was previously affiliated with the Nationalist People's Coalition.

Villa won re-election against Enrique Villanueva mayor Cacang Masayon (Aksyon Demokratiko).

Candidate	Party	Votes	%
Jake Vincent Villa (incumbent)	Partido Federal ng Pilipinas	42,149	57.99
Cacang Masayon	Aksyon Demokratiko	30,529	42.01
Total		72,678	100.00
Valid votes		72,678	97.22
Invalid/blank votes		2,080	2.78
Total votes		74,758	100.00
Registered voters/turnout		81,404	91.84
PFP hold			
Source: Commission on Elections

=== Vice Governor ===
Term-limited incumbent Vice Governor Mimi Quezon of Aksyon Demokratiko is running for the House of Representatives in Siquijor's lone legislative district. She was previously affiliated with the Nationalist People's Coalition.

Aksyon Demokratiko nominated former Larena mayor Danny Villa, who was defeated by provincial board member Dindo Tumala of the Partido Federal ng Pilipinas.

Candidate	Party	Votes	%
Dindo Tumala	Partido Federal ng Pilipinas	40,684	57.60
Danny Villa	Aksyon Demokratiko	29,950	42.40
Total		70,634	100.00
Valid votes		70,634	94.48
Invalid/blank votes		4,124	5.52
Total votes		74,758	100.00
Registered voters/turnout		81,404	91.84
PFP gain from Aksyon			
Source: Commission on Elections

=== Provincial Board ===
Since Siquijor's reclassification as a 3rd class province, the Siquijor Provincial Board is composed of 11 board members, eight of whom are elected.

The Partido Federal ng Pilipinas won eight seats, gaining a majority in the provincial board.

Party	Votes	%	Seats	+/–
Partido Federal ng Pilipinas	148,829	65.03	8	+8
Aksyon Demokratiko	80,017	34.97	0	–1
Total	228,846	100.00	8	+2
Total votes	74,758	–		
Registered voters/turnout	81,404	91.84		
Source: Commission on Elections

==== 1st district ====
Siquijor's 1st provincial district consists of the municipalities of Enrique Villanueva, Larena and Siquijor. Four board members are elected from this provincial district.

Seven candidates were included in the ballot.

Candidate	Party	Votes	%
Brylle Tumarong-Quio (incumbent)	Partido Federal ng Pilipinas	19,948	16.88
Junnie Jumawan	Partido Federal ng Pilipinas	19,208	16.26
Rene Woo	Partido Federal ng Pilipinas	18,201	15.40
Erson Digal (incumbent)	Partido Federal ng Pilipinas	17,036	14.42
Andresito Cortes	Aksyon Demokratiko	16,452	13.92
Jap Royo	Aksyon Demokratiko	13,973	11.83
Marlon Padayha	Aksyon Demokratiko	13,332	11.28
Total		118,150	100.00
Total votes		37,308	–
Registered voters/turnout		40,635	91.81
Source: Commission on Elections

==== 2nd district ====
Siquijor's 2nd provincial district consists of the municipalities of Lazi, Maria and San Juan. Four board members are elected from this provincial district.

Seven candidates were included in the ballot.

Candidate	Party	Votes	%
Ed Mark Baroy	Partido Federal ng Pilipinas	19,896	17.97
Rommel Dimagnaong	Partido Federal ng Pilipinas	19,872	17.95
Bobong Vios	Partido Federal ng Pilipinas	18,527	16.74
Heddah Vios Largo	Partido Federal ng Pilipinas	16,141	14.58
Orville Fua (incumbent)	Aksyon Demokratiko	13,320	12.03
Shirley Ligutom	Aksyon Demokratiko	11,797	10.66
Edwin Quimno	Aksyon Demokratiko	11,143	10.07
Total		110,696	100.00
Total votes		37,450	–
Registered voters/turnout		40,769	91.86
Source: Commission on Elections

== Election-related incidents ==
On the last day of candidate registration on October 8, 2024, an attempt was made to steal a certificate of candidacy at a COMELEC office in Himamaylan, Negros Occidental. On May 8, 2025, COMELEC designated Guihulngan and La Libertad in Negros Oriental on its red-category areas of concern due to security threats from the New People's Army.

In Silay, Negros Occidental, two supporters of reelectionist mayor Joedith Gallego were killed while five others were injured in a shooting near a campaign area on polling day. In Bacolod, at least 50 people queuing to vote were stung by bees at a polling station in Barangay Tanub.
