= 2022 Bacolod local elections =

2022 elections in the Philippines

- May 9, 2022
Nominee	Albee Benitez	Evelio Leonardia
Party	PDP–Laban	Nacionalista
Running mate	Caesar Distrito	El Cid Familiaran
Popular vote	171,893	107,447
Percentage	61.54	38.46
Mayor before election
Evelio Leonardia
Nacionalista
Elected mayor
Albee Benitez
PDP–Laban

As part of the Philippine general election on May 9, 2022, local elections were held in Bacolod to elect the mayor, vice mayor, twelve regular members of the city council, and the representative of the city's lone congressional district.

Incumbent mayor Evelio Leonardia (Nacionalista/Grupo Progreso) failed to win a third consecutive term as he was defeated by former Negros Occidental 3rd district representative Albee Benitez (PDP–Laban/Asenso Bacolod). Meanwhile, incumbent vice mayor El Cid Familiaran, who was Leonardia's running mate, won re-election after defeating Caesar Distrito, Benitez's running mate. In the Bacolod City Council, Benitez's Asenso Bacolod ticket won a majority of eight seats, while Leonardia's Grupo Progreso won the remaining four seats. In the House of Representatives, congressman Greg Gasataya won a third consecutive term. The elected officials assumed their respective offices on June 30, 2022 and are expected to each serve a three-year term until June 30, 2025.

== Background ==
Incumbent Mayor Evelio Leonardia will run for reelection. He will be challenged by former Negros Occidental 3rd district representative Albee Benitez.

Incumbent Vice Mayor El Cid Familiaran will also run for reelection. He will face incumbent councilors Caesar Distrito and Wilson Gamboa Jr.

Representative Greg Gasataya will run for his third term. His opponents are businessman and former BREDCO Port consultant Daniel Alfonso Atayde, former police officer Wilfredo David, engineer Narciso San Miguel and independent candidate Romy Gustilo.

== Mayoral and vice mayoral election ==
The candidates for mayor and vice mayor with the highest number of votes wins the seat; they are voted separately, therefore, they may be of different parties when elected.

=== Mayor ===
Bacolod Mayoralty election
Party	Candidate	Votes	%
PDP–Laban	Albee Benitez	171,893	61.54
Nacionalista	Evelio Leonardia	107,447	38.46
Total votes		279,340	100.00

=== Vice Mayor ===
Bacolod Vice Mayoralty election
Party	Candidate	Votes	%
Nacionalista	El Cid Familiaran	128,893	48.79
PDP–Laban	Caesar Distrito	103,236	39.08
Independent	Wilson Gamboa Jr.	32,033	12.13
Total votes		264,162	100.00

== District Representative election ==
2022 Philippine House of Representatives election in the Lone District of Bacolod
Party	Candidate	Votes	%
NPC	Greg Gasataya	185,470	69.14
Independent	Daniel Atayde	80,591	30.04
PDDS	Nonong San Miguel	850	0.32
Independent	Romy Gustilo	738	0.28
Independent	Wilfredo David	618	0.23
Total votes		268,267	100.00

== City Council election ==
Election is via plurality-at-large voting: A voter votes for up to twelve candidates, then the twelve candidates with the highest number of votes are elected.

=== Grupo Progreso ===
NP-led Coalition
Name	Party
Em Ang	Nacionalista
Carlos Jose Lopez	Nacionalista
Archie Baribar	PROMDI
Jonathan Diaz Jr.	Nacionalista
Renecito Novero	Nacionalista
Dindo Ramos	Nacionalista
Israel Salanga	Nacionalista
Cindy Rojas	Nacionalista
Ed Guillem	Nacionalista
Cash Montalvo	Nacionalista
Marlon Solidum	NPC
Chris Sorongon	Nacionalista

=== Asenso Bacolod ===
PDP–Laban-led Coalition
Name	Party
Simplicia Distrito	PDP–Laban
Al Victor Espino	NPC
Bart Orola	PDP–Laban
Pao Sy	NPC
Homer Bais	PDP–Laban
Sonya Verdeflor	UNegA
Celia Flor	Independent
Kalaw Puentevella	PROMDI
Jude Thaddeus Sayson	PDP–Laban
Vladimir Gonzalez	PDP–Laban
Jason Villarosa	Lakas
Patrick Lacson	PDP–Laban

=== Results ===
Bacolod City Council election
Party	Candidate	Votes	%
PDP–Laban	Jude Thaddeus Sayson	134,625	46.39
Nacionalista	Israel Salanga	123,237	42.47
Nacionalista	Cindy Rojas	122,629	42.26
Nacionalista	Em Ang	116,953	40.30
NPC	Al Espino	115,197	39.70
PDP–Laban	Vladimir Gonzalez	113,745	38.99
Nacionalista	Renecito Novero	113,046	38.95
Lakas	Jason Villarosa	111,027	38.26
PROMDI	Kalaw Puentevella	108,950	37.54
PDP–Laban	Simplicia Distrito	107,030	36.88
Independent	Celia Flor	103,768	35.76
NPC	Pao Sy	98,978	34.11
PROMDI	Archie Baribar	94,445	32.54
PDP–Laban	Bart Orola	94,230	32.47
PDP–Laban	Homer Bais	94,030	32.40
Nacionalista	Dindo Ramos	94,026	32.40
PDP–Laban	Patrick Lacson	91,261	31.45
UNegA	Sonya Verdeflor	87,873	30.28
Nacionalista	Carlos Jose Lopez	83,226	28.68
NPC	Marlon Solidum	81,793	28.18
Nacionalista	Chris Sorongon	81,548	28.10
Nacionalista	Cash Montalvo	70,472	24.28
Aksyon	Ricardo Tan	68,915	23.75
Nacionalista	Ed Guillem	65,300	22.50
Nacionalista	Jonathan Diaz Jr.	54,644	18.83
NPC	Mark Steven Mayo	38,348	13.21
Independent	Cesar Beloria Jr.	28,855	9.94
Independent	Rico Villafuerte	20,075	6.92
PPM	Eduardo Padios	19,249	6.63
Independent	Alan Arroyo	15,264	5.26
Independent	Christian Weber	12,523	4.32
Independent	Bong Hermosura	10,917	3.76
PRP	Lorenzo Ruben Contreras	10,458	3.60
Independent	Vic Gico	8,373	2.89
Independent	Jiffy Jauod	7,096	2.45
Independent	Kenneth Ian Belario	6,878	2.37
Independent	Fermin Nacionales	5,986	2.06
Independent	Joel Aujero	5,207	1.79
Total votes		2,619,587	100.00
