= Legislative districts of Bacolod =

Legislative district of the Philippines

The legislative districts of Bacolod are the representations of the highly urbanized city of Bacolod in the various national legislatures of the Philippines. The city is currently represented in the lower house of the Congress of the Philippines through its lone congressional district.

It was represented as part of the at-large district of Negros Occidental from 1898 to 1899, 1943 to 1944, and 1985 to 1986, the second district of Negros Occidental from 1907 to 1941 and 1945 to 1972, and of Region VI from 1978 to 1984.

== Senatorial representation ==
Between 1916 and 1935, the then-municipality of Bacolod, under the province of Negros Occidental, was represented in the Senate of the Philippines through the 8th senatorial district of the Philippine Islands. However, in 1935, all senatorial districts were abolished when a unicameral National Assembly was installed under a new constitution following the passage of the Tydings–McDuffie Act, which established the Commonwealth of the Philippines. Since the 1941 elections, when the Senate was restored after a constitutional plebiscite, all twenty-four members of the upper house have been elected countrywide at-large.

== Congressional representation ==
Bacolod has been represented in the lower house of various Philippine national legislatures since 1943, through its at-large congressional district.

== Lone District ==
Legislative Districts and Congressional Representatives of Bacolod City
| District | Current Representative | Party | Barangays | Population (2020) | Area |
|---|---|---|---|---|---|
| Lone | Albee Benitez (since 2025); Mandalagan | PFP | List: 1 to 41 (Poblacion); Alangilan; Alijis; Banago; Bata; Cabug; Estefanía; Felisa; Granada; Handumanan; Mandalagan; Mansilingan; Montevista; Pahanocoy; Punta Taytay; Singcang-Airport; Sum-ag; Taculing; Tangub; Villamonte; Vista Alegre | 600,783 | 162.67 km^{2} |

== See also ==
- Legislative districts of Negros Occidental
