= Paglaum Party (Negros Occidental) =

Political party in the Philippines

- President: George Zulueta
- Chairman: Bobby Montelibano
- Founded: 1988
- Headquarters: Bacolod
- Ideology: Regionalism; Nationalism
- Political position: Center-right
- National affiliation: Nacionalista

Paglaum Party, officially the Partido Paglaum sang Banwa (lit. 'Party of the People's Hope'), is a provincial political party in Negros Occidental, Philippines based in Bacolod.

== Establishment ==
Paglaum was established as the pioneer local political party in Negros Occidental by the late former Bacolod Mayor Alfredo Montelibano, Jr. in 1988 for his political run. Despite the similarity in names, Bukidnon Paglaum Party is not related to the Negros Occidental Paglaum Party.

== Notable politicians ==
After the incumbency of Mayor Montelibano, Paglaum Party continued as a minority party that fielded candidates to the City Council. Notable members and former members include:

- Alfredo Montelibano, Jr.: Governor of Negros Occidental, 1968-1986, Mayor of Bacolod, 1988-1995
- Oscar Verdeflor: Mayor of Bacolod, 1998-2001
- Luzviminda Valdez: Vice Mayor of Bacolod, 1998-2001, Mayor, 2001-2004
- Ramiro Garcia, Jr.: Vice Mayor of Bacolod, 2001-2004
- Alex Paglumotan: Member, Bacolod City Council, 2007-2016

== Recent participation ==
Reactivated as a local party on December 14, 2015, Paglaum participated in the 2016 Bacolod local elections under the Grupo Progreso Coalition of Mayor Evelio Leonardia. It fielded George Zulueta as a candidate but failed to gain a seat in the Bacolod City Council.

== See also ==
- United Negros Alliance
