= Evelio Leonardia =

Filipino politician, lawyer and realtor

Honorable Evelio Leonardia
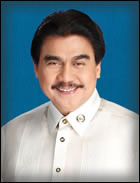

36th Mayor of Bacolod
- In office June 30, 2016 – June 30, 2022
- Vice Mayor: El Cid Familiaran
- Preceded by: Monico Puentevella
- Succeeded by: Albee Benitez
- In office June 30, 2004 – June 30, 2013
- Vice Mayor: Renecito Novero (2004–2007); Jude Thaddeus Sayson (2007–2013)
- Preceded by: Luzviminda Valdez
- Succeeded by: Monico Puentevella
- In office June 30, 1995 – June 30, 1998
- Vice Mayor: Wilmar Drilon
- Preceded by: Romeo Guanzon
- Succeeded by: Oscar Verdeflor

Member of the Philippine House of Representatives from Bacolod's lone district
- In office June 30, 2013 – June 30, 2016
- Preceded by: Anthony Golez, Jr.
- Succeeded by: Greg Gasataya

Vice Mayor of Bacolod
- In office June 30, 1992 – June 30, 1995
- Mayor: Alfredo Montelibano Jr.
- Preceded by: Kenneth Barredo
- Succeeded by: Wilmar Drilon

Member of the Bacolod City Council
- In office February 2, 1988 – June 30, 1992

Personal details
- Born: Evelio Ramos Leonardia; July 10, 1952 (age 74) Bacolod, Philippines
- Party: Nacionalista (2021–present); Team El Cid (2024–present) (local party)
- Other political affiliations: PDP–Laban (1988–1995); Lakas (1995-2001); Independent (2001-2004); NPC (2004–2021); Grupo Progreso (2004–2024) (local party)
- Spouse: Elsa Jeruta Fuentes
- Education: University of St. La Salle(BS); University of Negros Occidental – Recoletos(LL.B)

Evelio Ramos Leonardia (born 10 July 1952), also known as Bing Leonardia, is a Filipino politician, lawyer, and realtor who served as mayor of Bacolod thrice: 1995 to 1998, 2004 to 2013, and 2016 to 2022—six terms overall. He also previously served as the representative of Bacolod's lone district from 2013 to 2016, vice mayor of Bacolod from 1992 to 1995 under Mayor Alfredo Montelibano, and a member of the Bacolod City Council from 1988 to 1992. He started his civil service career with the Department of Tourism.

== Early life ==
Evelio Leonardia was born to a Court of First Instance Clerk of Court Jose Tulo Leonardia, and Ester Javier Ramos, a housewife on July 10, 1952, in Bacolod, Philippines. He had nine siblings.

=== Education ===
Leonardia graduated highschool from La Consolacion College-Bacolod, and in 1973 earned his degree of Bachelor of Science in commerce from then La Salle College-Bacolod, now University of St. La Salle, graduating cum laude.

In 1979, he finished the Bachelor of Laws degree from University of Negros Occidental – Recoletos and passed the Bar Examinations conducted by the Supreme Court of the Philippines with a rating of 81.90% that same year.

=== Early career ===
During 1973 to 1978 served the Philippine Commercial International Bank of Bacolod in various positions, culminating as the officer-in-charge.

== Political career ==
=== 1978-1995 ===
From 1978 to 1986, he first entered public service as Provincial Field Coordinator of Negros Occidental for the Department of Tourism, holding the position for almost nine years. From 1987 to 1988, he briefly returned to the private sector as general manager of Prawntech, Inc.

Beginning in the Fifth Republic, after the EDSA People Power Revolution, Leonardia was first elected to the Bacolod City Council in 1988 Philippine local elections, gaining the most number of votes amongst councilors. He served as a director of the Negros Occidental chapters of the National Movement of Young Legislators president of the Philippine Councilors League.

Leonardia headed various committee chairs in the Sangguniang Panlungsod. Both the Committee on Education, Culture and Tourism, and the Committee on Ways and Means from 1988 to 1990, the Price Monitoring Council from 1989 to 1991, and the Committee on Social Defense and Fire from 1990 to 1992.

During this time, he passed and was placed 7th in the Negros Occidental Real Estate Broker Examination in 1990, and resumed position in the private sector as vice president for International Affairs Real Estate Brokers Association of the Philippines, from 1990 to 1992.

During the 1992 Philippine presidential election, he campaigned and was elected as vice mayor of the city of Bacolod, during the term of Alfredo Montelibano Jr. During this time, he was elected as the Senior Executive Vice President of the Vice Mayors League of the Philippines.

=== 1995-1998 ===
Working as vice mayor garnered Leonardia enough support to be elected in his first term as mayor of Bacolod in the 1995 Philippine general election in the middle of the term of then president Fidel Ramos. Leonardia's deputy Wilmar Drilon served a vice mayor. Leonardia's brother, Prospero Leonardia, was also involved in the administration of his brother, became his private secretary and his trustee in government projects.

In the 1998 Philippine general election, however, he was defeated by Oscar Verdeflor, who won the mayoralty seat, with his running mate, Luzviminda Valdez as vice mayor.

=== 1998-2004 ===
Upon the end of the term of Oscar Verdeflor, he was later on replaced by his deputy, then incumbent vice mayor, Luzviminda Valdez, as mayor in the next election. Valdez campaigned for the same mayoral position as Leonardia and defeated him in the 2001 Philippine general election.

=== 2004-2013 ===
Leonardia campaigned for office in 2004 Philippine general election, narrowly winning over Valdez. It was in this second term as mayor that he was elected Deputy Secretary General for Visayas, National Vice Chairman and National Executive Vice President of the League of Cities of the Philippines, in each of his renewed mandate as mayor thereon to his third term on 2007 Philippine general election, and fourth term on 2010 Philippine general election. Leonardia's second to fourth term services coincided with the terms of the presidents Gloria Macapagal Arroyo and Benigno Aquino III.

=== 2013-2016 ===
He campaigned in the 2013 Philippine general election as congressman, with Grupo Progreso, and supported by the Nationalist People’s Coalition.

One of Leonardia's brothers, Andres, aged 62, was found dead with a bullet wound in the head in his room in Silay City, Negros Occidental in the morning of January 2, 2013. A widower, he had been running for Bacolod councilor in the May elections under the party of his brother, Evelio, who was running for Congress. The police chief of Silay, superintendent Arturo Francisco, ruled that it was a case of accidental firing as there was nothing to show that there was foul play or that it was a suicide. His slot was replaced by another brother, Prospero, an architect.

Evelio Leonardia was elected as the Representative of Lone District of Bacolod on June 30, 2013, defeating businessman and then incumbent representative Anthony Golez Jr., former counselor and lawyer Lyndon Caña, and Ely Sergio Palma. In the meantime, his rival in previous elections, Monico Puentevella was able to win the post as mayor of the city of Bacolod.

=== 2016-2022 ===
Both Evelio Leonardia and the previous incumbent, Puentevella, filed their certificates of candidacy in October 2015 for the mayoral post in the 2016 local elections of Bacolod.

In the aftermath of the local election of the city of Bacolod of the 2016 Philippine general election, Leonardia defeated Puentevella and independent candidate Wilfredo David, and was reelected as mayor of Bacolod for his fifth term, together with his running mate El Cid Familiaran.

During the campaign period of 2019 Philippine general election, Leonardia was endorsed by Danding Cojuangco and Rodrigo Duterte on March 21, 2019. Leonardia was also then endorsed by Davao City Mayor Sara Duterte, Partido Demokratiko Pilipino-Lakas ng Bayan (PDP-Laban) president Senator Koko Pimentel, Senate President Tito Sotto, and former Department of the Interior and Local Government secretary Rafael Alunan III and a host of national politicians. Thus running under the banner of PDP-Laban, in the 2019 Philippine general election. Leonardia defeated his closest rival, former councilor and national ICT advocate Jocelle Batapa-Sigue.

In October 2019, he was appointed by the president Rodrigo Duterte as the representative of local government units to the Legislative Executive Development Advisory Council, the highest consultative and advisory body to the president on economic and development matters.

Billionaire businessman and rival Albee Benitez for the position of city mayor managed to unseat him in the local 2022 Philippine general election. He has henceforth filed an electoral protest at the COMELEC national office.

=== Later political career ===
Leonardia was defeated again by Benitez in the 2025 election for the city's seat in the House of Representatives.

== Controversies ==
In January 2017, then Ombudsman of the Philippines Conchita Carpio-Morales ordered the dismissal from office of Leonardia, then secretary to the mayor Goldwyn Nifras; city budget officer Luzviminda Treyes; department of public services head Nelson Sedillo Sr.; city engineers Belly Aguillon, Aladino Agbones and Jaries Ebenizer Encabo; city accountant Eduardo Ravena, and city treasurer Annabelle Badajos after they were charged guilty of grave misconduct and gross neglect of duty.

Leonardia and the other eight accused were meted out the accessory penalties of perpetual disqualification from holding public office, forfeiture of retirement benefits, cancellation of civil service eligibility and barred from taking the civil service examination.

The order of dismissal was reversed by the Court of Appeals of the Philippines in September of the same year. Leonardia was set to face trial before the Sandiganbayan for violation of Section 3(e) of the Anti-Graft and Corrupt Practices Act (Republic Act No. 3019) over the alleged anomalous procurement of forty-nine million pesos worth of furniture and fixtures for the city's new National Government Center. The graft case was dismissed by the Sandiganbayan in February 2018 and the ombudsman appointee by the president Duterte, Samuel Martires cleared him of the charges.

== Personal life ==
Evelio Leonardia is married to Elsa Jeruta Fuentes, who graduated summa cum laude from the University of St. La Salle. He has two children, Evelio Jose F. Leonardia, and Loren Kara F. Leonardia, a painter.

== Notable awards and recognition ==
- Founding Chairman of the MassKara Foundation
- September 2019: Represented the Philippines at the Korea Foundation Program for Political Affairs in Seoul, Korea
- November 2019: Represented the Philippines at the UCLG World Summit of Local and Regional Leaders in Durban, South Africa
- Founding Chairman of the MassKara Foundation
- Man of the Year Awardee in the Asia Leaders Awards at the Makati Shangri-la Hotel, November 2019
