= Paglaum Party =

Paglaum Party may refer to:

- Bukidnon Paglaum
- Paglaum Party (Negros Occidental)
