= 2016 Bacolod local elections =

Philippine election

- May 9, 2016
Nominee	Evelio Leonardia	Monico Puentevella	Wilfredo David
Party	NPC	NUP	Independent
Running mate	El Cid Familiaran	Vladimir Gonzales
Popular vote	120,231	97,993	3,453
Percentage	54.2%	44.2%	1.4%
Mayor before election
Monico Puentevella
NUP
Elected mayor
Evelio Leonardia
NPC

Local elections were held in Bacolod on May 9, 2016, as part of the Philippine general election. The elective local posts in the city: the mayor, vice mayor, the congressman, and twelve councilors, were filled in.

== Background ==
Former Mayor, now Bacolod Representative, Evelio Leonardia served out his term limitation for the mayoralty post as Bacolod's lone district representative to Congress. He chose to contest his former post against incumbent Mayor Monico Puentevella.

== Mayoral and vice mayoral election ==
The candidates for mayor and vice mayor with the highest number of votes wins the seat; they are voted separately, therefore, they may be of different parties when elected.

=== Results ===
Bacolod Mayoralty election
Party	Candidate	Votes	%
NPC	Evelio Leonardia	120,231	54.2%
NUP	Monico Puentevella	97,993	44.2%
Independent	Wilfredo David	3,453	1.6%
Total votes		221,677	100%

Bacolod Vice Mayoralty election
Party	Candidate	Votes	%
Liberal	El Cid Familiaran	108,360	55.6%
NUP	Vladimir Gonzales	86,611	44.4%
Total votes		194,971	100%

== District Representative election ==
Philippine House of Representatives election at Bacolod City
Party	Candidate	Votes	%
NPC	Greg Gasataya	85,467	41.15%
NUP	Jude Thaddeus Sayson	84,431	40.65%
Liberal	Carlos Jose Lopez	18,211	8.76%
Independent	Archie Baribar	17,460	8.40%
Independent	Rolando Villamor	1,491	0.71%
Independent	Joel David Enriquez	628	0.30%
Invalid or blank votes		27,953	
Total votes		235,641	100.00%

== City Council election ==
Election is via plurality-at-large voting: A voter votes for up to twelve candidates, then the ten candidates with the highest number of votes are elected.

=== Grupo Progreso ===
NPC-led Coalition
Name	Party
Em Ang	NPC
Caesar Distrito	Nacionalista
Renecito Novero	NPC
Ricardo Tan	NPC
Elmer Sy	NPC
Al Victor Espino	NPC
Dindo Ramos	NPC
Bart Orola	NPC
Marlon Solidum	NPC
Cindy Rojas	NPC
Israel Salanga	NPC
George Zulueta	NPC

=== Partido MKK ===
NUP-led Coalition
Name	Party
Ronnie Albao	Independent
Catalino Alisbo	Liberal
Homer Bais	NUP
Francis Balzomo	Independent
Bong Dilag	NUP
Wilson Gamboa, Jr.	Independent
Ana Marie Palermo	Liberal
Alex Paglumotan	NUP
Kalaw Puentevella	Nacionalista
Arnel Sigue	Independent
Jocelyn Uychiat	NUP
Sonya Verdeflor	Liberal

=== Results ===
Bacolod City Council election
Party	Candidate	Votes	%
NPC	Ricardo Tan	118,927	50.4%
Nacionalista	Caesar Distrito	115,161	48.8%
NPC	Cindy Rojas	110,054	46.7%
NPC	Rene Novero	109,156	46.3%
NPC	Em Ang	107,807	45.8%
NPC	Elmer Sy	101,423	43.0%
Liberal	Ana Marie Palermo	99,003	42.0%
Independent	Wilson Gamboa, Jr.	97,660	41.4%
NPC	Dindo Ramos	96,665	41.0%
NPC	Bart Orola	95,328	40.4%
Nacionalista	Kalaw Puentevella	94,677	40.2%
Liberal	Sonya Verdeflor	93,170	39.5%
NUP	Homer Bais	90,531	38.4%
NPC	Al Espino	88,991	37.8%
NUP	Alex Paglumotan	86,622	36.8%
NPC	Israel Salanga	83,148	35.3%
NUP	Bong Dilag	81,345	34.5%
Independent	Arnel Sigue	80,014	34.0%
Liberal	Catalino Alisbo	75,818	32.2%
NPC	Marlon Solidum	60,482	25.7%
NPC	George Zulueta	47,761	20.3%
NUP	Jo Uychiat	41,010	17.4%
Independent	Francis Balzomo	37,073	15.7%
Independent	Ronnie Albao	24,884	10.6%
Independent	Rico Villafuerte	17,296	7.33%
Independent	Alan Arroyo	12,011	5.09%
Independent	Jose Godfrey Peraren	7,148	3.03%
Total votes		235,641	100%
