= University of St. La Salle =

Roman Catholic university in Bacolod, Philippines

- Pamantasan ng St. La Salle (Filipino)
- Teach Minds, Touch Hearts and Transform Lives
- Former name: La Salle College – Bacolod (1952–1988)
- Motto: Religio, Mores, Cultura (Latin)
- Motto in English: Religion, Morals, Culture
- Type: Private, Roman Catholic, research, non-stock, coeducational basic and higher education institution
- Established: July 7, 1952; 74 years ago
- Founders: Br. Dennis Ruhland, FSC; Br. Hugh Wester, FSC; Br. V. Felix Masson, FSC
- Religious affiliation: Roman Catholic (Christian Brothers)
- Academic affiliations: DLSP
- Chancellor: Minnie O. Chua
- President: Br. Joaquin S. Martinez, FSC
- Administrative staff: 576
- Students: 12,657
- Location: La Salle Ave, Bacolod, Negros Occidental, Philippines; 10°40′44″N 122°57′45″E
- Campus: Urban: Main Campus 10 ha (100,000 m^{2}) La Salle Avenue (includes Liceo–De La Salle) Satellite campuses Montelibano Campus (USLS-Integrated School) Alunan Campus (USLS-Integrated School) USLS Health Sciences Campus Rural: Satellite campus Granada Campus 55 ha (550,000 m^{2}) Brgy Granada, Bacolod
- Alma Mater song: Alma Mater Hymn
- Patron saint: St. Jean-Baptiste de La Salle
- Colors: Green and white
- Nickname: Lasallian
- Mascot: Stinger
- Website: www.usls.edu.ph

- Location in the Visayas Location in the Philippines

The University of St. La Salle (USLS) is a Catholic private research university run by the De La Salle Brothers, located in La Salle Avenue, Bacolod, Negros Occidental, Philippines. Established in 1952 as La Salle College - Bacolod, it is the second oldest campus founded by the congregation in the country (first and oldest outside of Manila).

The university is a member of De La Salle Philippines, a network established in 2006 comprising 16 Lasallian educational institutions in the Philippine islands. The university offers preschool, elementary, secondary (junior & senior high), undergraduate, and graduate programs. It has nine colleges, namely: Business and Accountancy, Tourism and Hospitality, Engineering, Computing Studies, Arts and Sciences, Education, Nursing, Law, and Medicine.

== History ==
The St. La Salle Coliseum

USLS was founded in 1952 by Br. Dennis Ruhland FSC, Br. Hugh Wester FSC, and Br. V. Felix Masson FSC. La Salle College-Bacolod opened with 175 male students from Prep to Grade 5, under seven faculty members. The school building was unimpressive, built amidst sprawling muddy grounds and bordered by cane fields of adjoining lands.In the 1960s, La Salle College-Bacolod expanded to provide College-level education. This was made possible through donations by alumni, parents and benefactors. The school became co-educational in 1966.

On July 5, 1988, La Salle College-Bacolod was formally elevated to university status and named University of St. La Salle during rites attended by then secretary of education Lourdes Quisumbing.

It played host to the beach volleyball and boxing events during the 2005 Southeast Asian Games.

== Campus ==
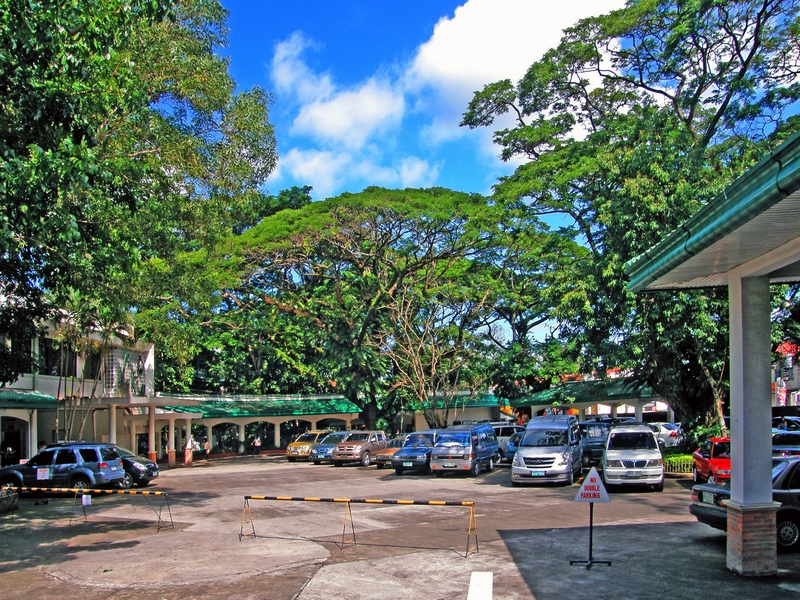
Inside USLS parking lot

The school's 10-hectare main campus in La Salle Avenue houses the university's college and graduate school units. The USLS Health Sciences Campus, located at Lacson St., is an additional facility for students under its Nursing and Medicine program. Its other campus, the 55-hectare Granada Campus, is home to the Agribusiness Farm and the Science Ecological Park, which caters to its Agribusiness students.

On October 7, 2024, the university unveiled its expansion in Pavia, Iloilo through a partnership with Property Company of Friends, Inc. (Profriends).

=== Liceo–De La Salle Senior High School ===
The Liceo–De La Salle Senior High School is located within the USLS La Salle Avenue (main) campus and offers grades 11 and 12. The senior high school program started in 2016 in compliance with the K-12 program of the national government.

Starting in 2026, the Liceo De La Salle would shift from the traditional STEM, ABM, HUMSS, A&D, and TVL strands to a strengthened curriculum, where HUMMS and A&D merged into Arts, Social Sciences, & Humanities (ASSH), ABM and TVL merged into Business and Entrepreneurship (BE), and STEM remained the same.

=== Integrated School Campuses ===
The university allotted PHP200 million for the construction of a new campus for the Integrated School in Brgy. Mandalagan with lot donated by the Alunan family. The original Integrated School in the Montelibano campus, which had about 2,000 I.S. students, was already congested. The new campus features two four-storey buildings and can accommodate up to 4,000 students. Construction of the building was completed in 2020.

== Patron saint ==
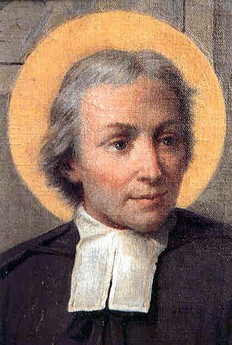
Jean Baptiste de La Salle

As a Catholic University, the university's patron saint is St. John Baptist de La Salle, a French priest, educational reformer, and founder of an international educational movement who spent over forty years of his life to educate poor children.

== Academics ==
USLS offers preschool, elementary, secondary, undergraduate and graduate level programs. La Salle offers academic programs under Business, Law, the Social Sciences, Psychology, Medicine, Biology, Chemistry, Computer Science, Engineering, Nursing, Education, and Hospitality Management. La Salle has nine Academic colleges, namely College of Nursing, College of Arts and Sciences, Yu An Log College of Business and Accountancy, College of Tourism and Hospitality, College of Education, College of Law, College of Engineering, College of Computing Studies, and College of Medicine.

== Student life ==
The Spectrum – The Spectrum is the Official Publication and the Official Student Media Corps of the University of St. La Salle. It is one of the oldest student publications in the Philippines, founded in 1956.

== Notable alumni ==
- Rafael Alunan III – former Secretary of the Interior and Local Government
- Mercedes Alvares – Deputy Speaker of the House of Representatives of the Philippines
- Francis Arnaiz – former basketball player for Barangay Ginebra San Miguel and Toyota Super Corollas in the Philippine Basketball Association
- Louie Casas – footballer (Ceres, Azkals)
- Alfonso Cusi – Secretary of Energy (Philippines)
- Rafael Coscoluella - former Governor of Negros Occidental
- Bro. Rolando Ramos Dizon, FSC – De La Salle Brother, Chairman of The Commission on Higher Education (Philippines)
- Alvin Elchico – ABS-CBN Broadcast Journalist
- Peque Gallaga – film director
- Bong Lacson — Governor of Negros Occidental
- Daniel Lacson Jr. – former Governor of Negros Occidental, former GSIS Chairman, former President of Negros Navigation
- Oscar J. Hilado – Former Chairman and CEO of PHINMA, in 2007 he was listed as the 33rd Richest man in the Philippines
- Ronnie Lazaro – actor
- Evelio Leonardia – Mayor of Bacolod, former Congressman
- Armin Luistro – De La Salle brother, former Secretary of the Department of Education (Philippines)
- Erik Matti – film director
- Joel P. Navarro – music conductor
- Tating Pasilan – footballer, team captain of Green Archers United F.C. in the United Football League (Philippines)
- Franz Ontal - Head of inspector training at the Organisation for the Prohibition of Chemical Weapons (OPCW), he was serving in this capacity when the organization won the 2013 Nobel Peace Prize
- Carlo Piccio – Olympic swimmer
- Jewel May Lobaton – Bb. Pilipinas-Universe, 1998
- Monico Puentevella – former congressman, former Bacolod Mayor
- Monsour del Rosario – Taekwondo champion, Film and TV actor, and congressman representing the first district of Makati
- Vickie Rushton – Mutya ng Pilipinas 2011, Pinoy Big Brother: All In Housemate
- Joel Torre – Film and Television actor
- Christian Vasquez – Film and Television actor
- Tan Yu – Billionaire-philanthropist, in 1997 he was ranked as the 'Richest man in the Philippines' with a net worth of $7 billion
- Jose Maria Zubiri Jr. – Governor of the Province of Bukidnon

== Notable faculty and benefactors ==
- Elsa Martinez Coscolluela – Writer, Academic, Won the Palanca Awards twenty times, is included in its Hall of Fame
- José Locsin – former Senator and Secretary of Health
- Alfredo Montelibano Sr. – served as the first mayor of Bacolod in 1938, as military governor of Negros Island and Siquijor Island from 1942 to 1945, and as Secretary of National Defense and Interior under President Sergio Osmeña from 1945 to 1946.

== Gallery ==
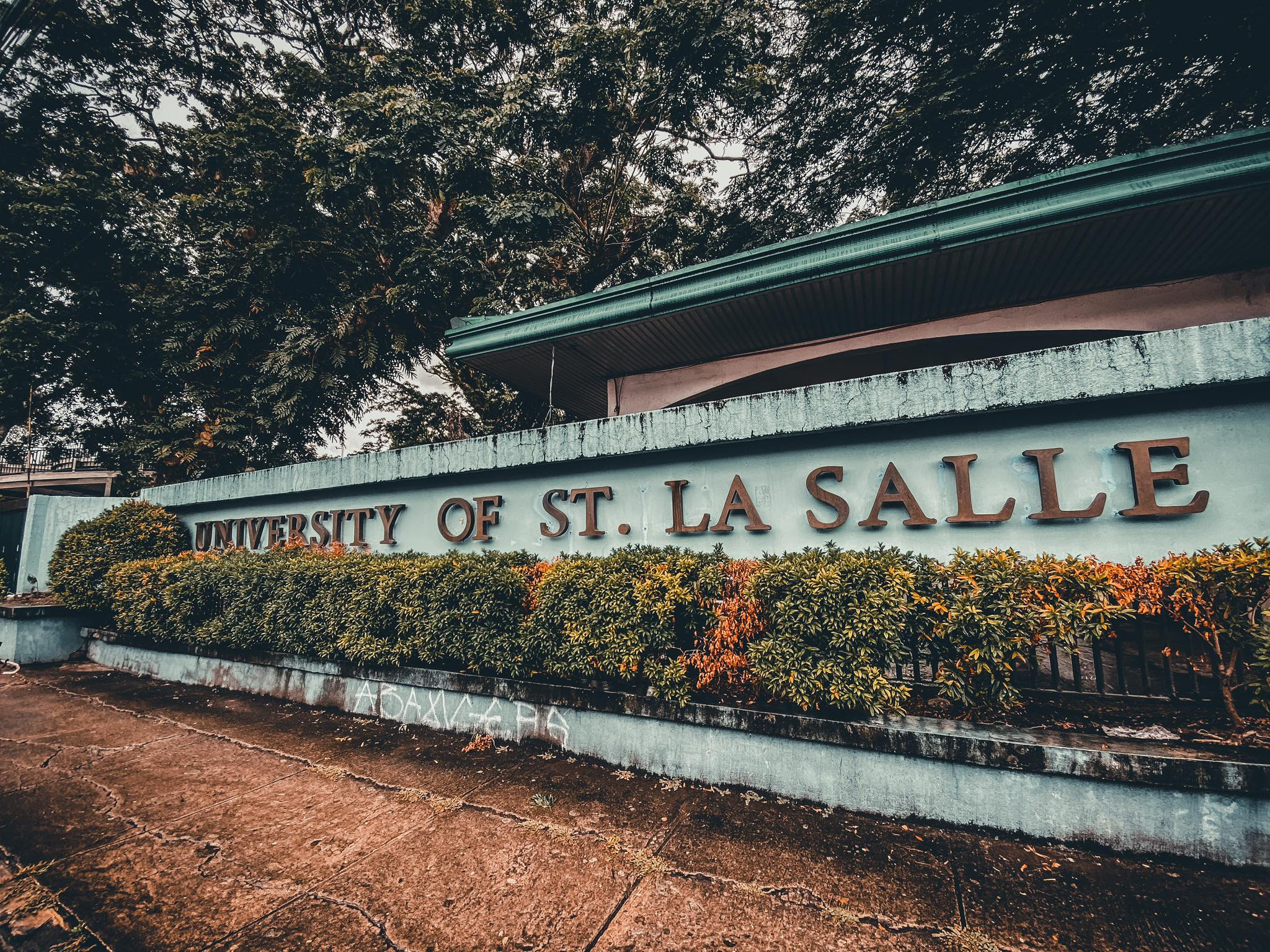
Gate of the University of St. La Salle

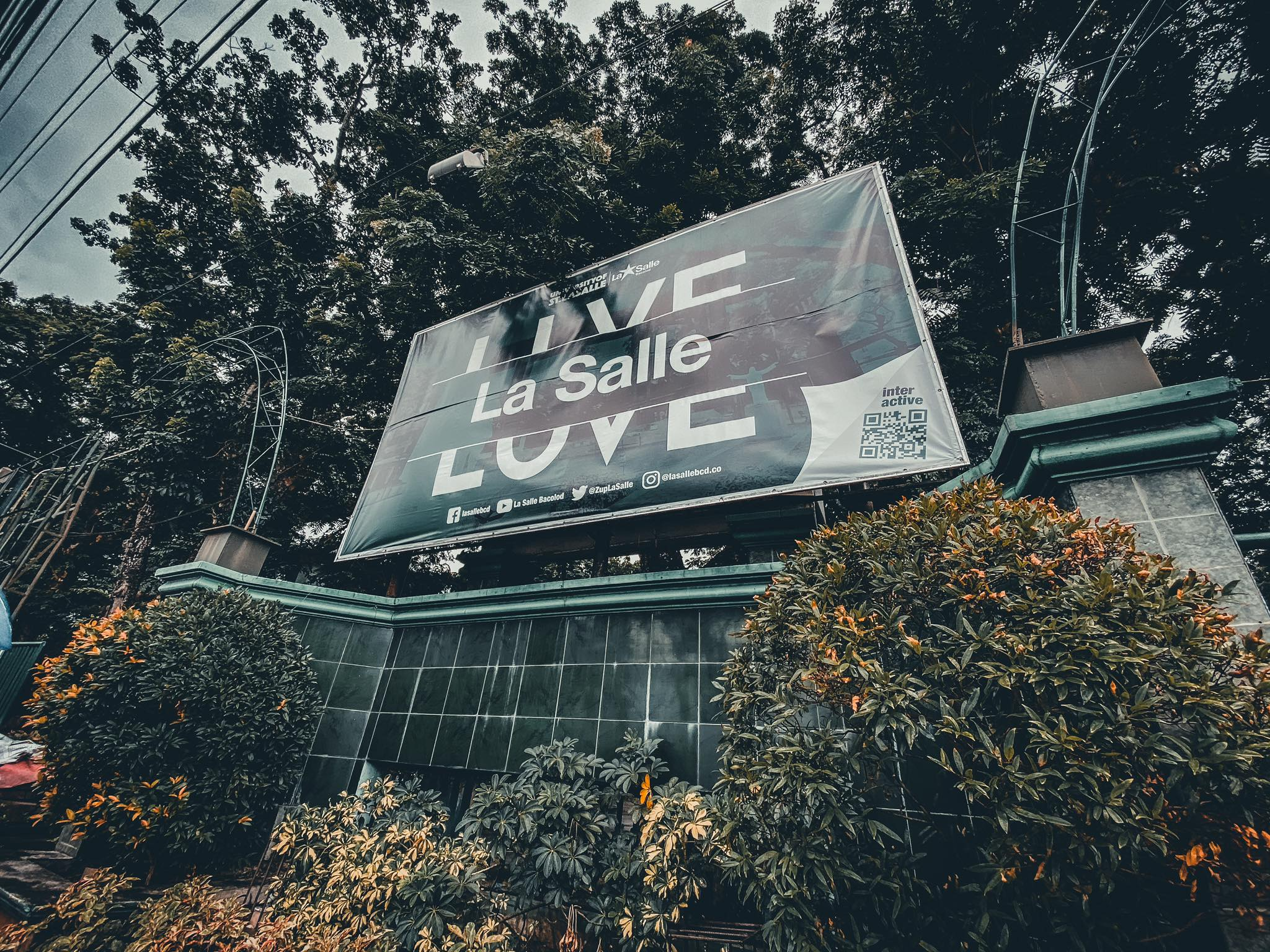
Facade of the University of St. La Salle

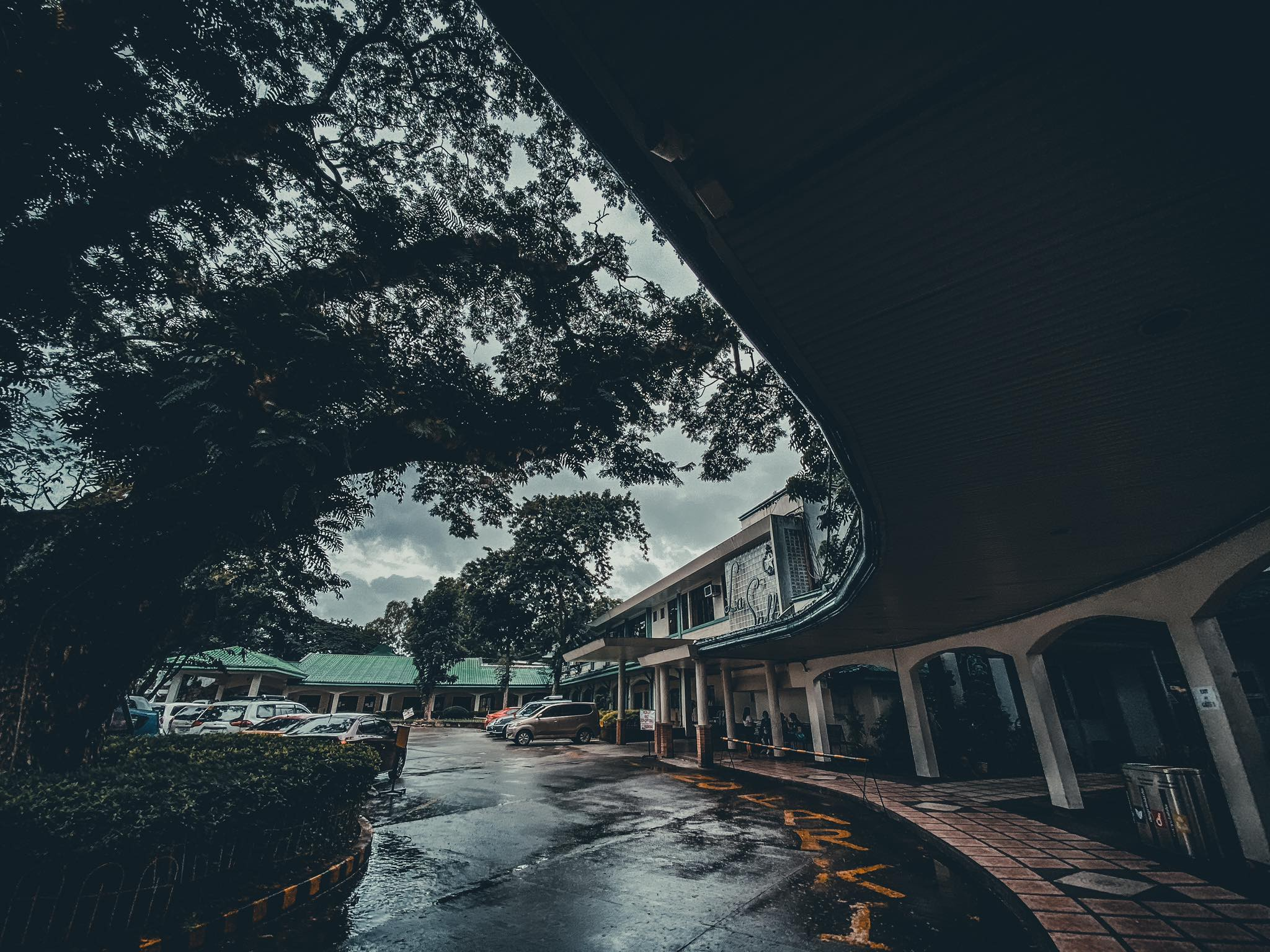
Entrance to the University of St. La Salle

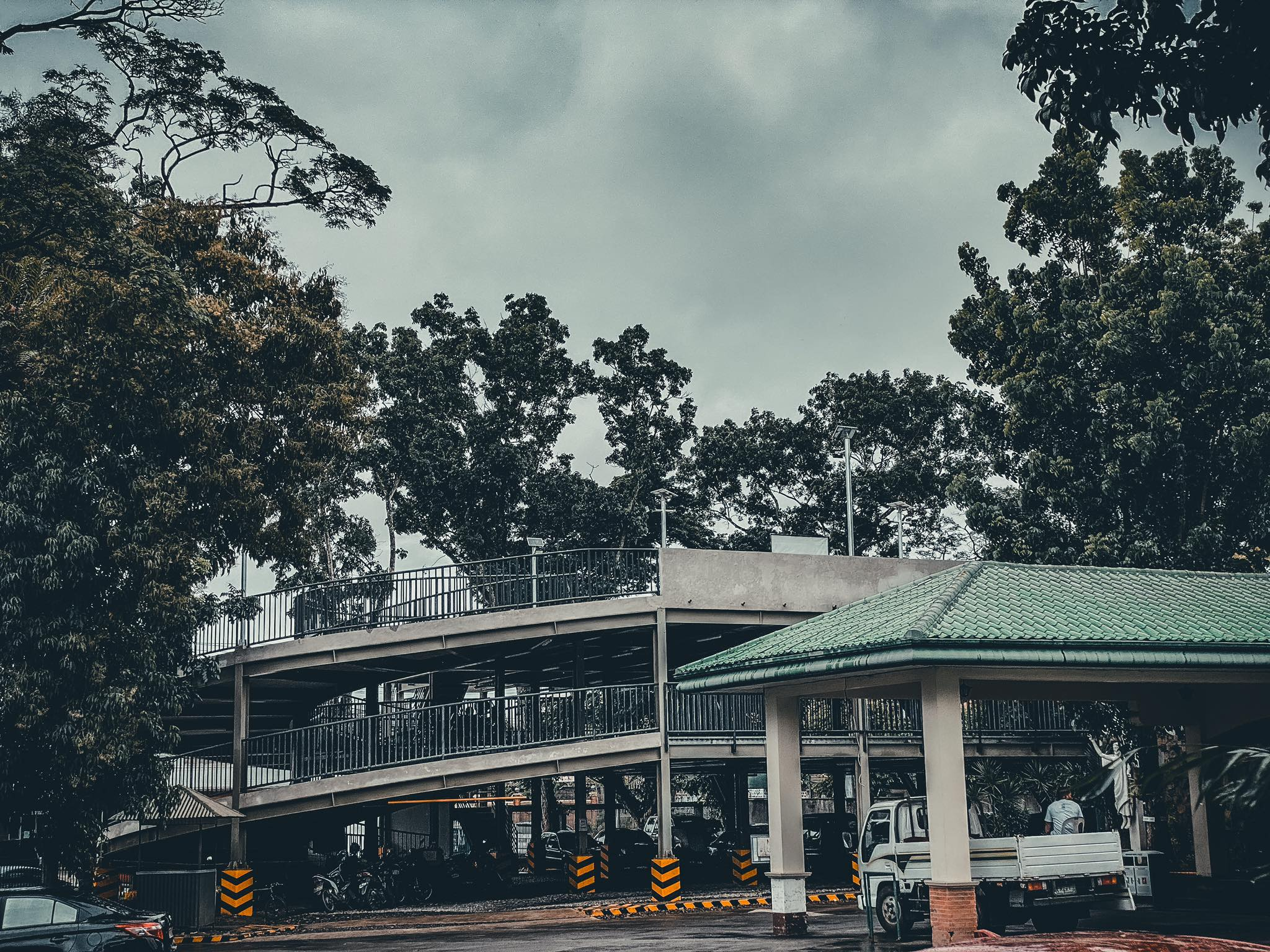
One of the parking lots of the university

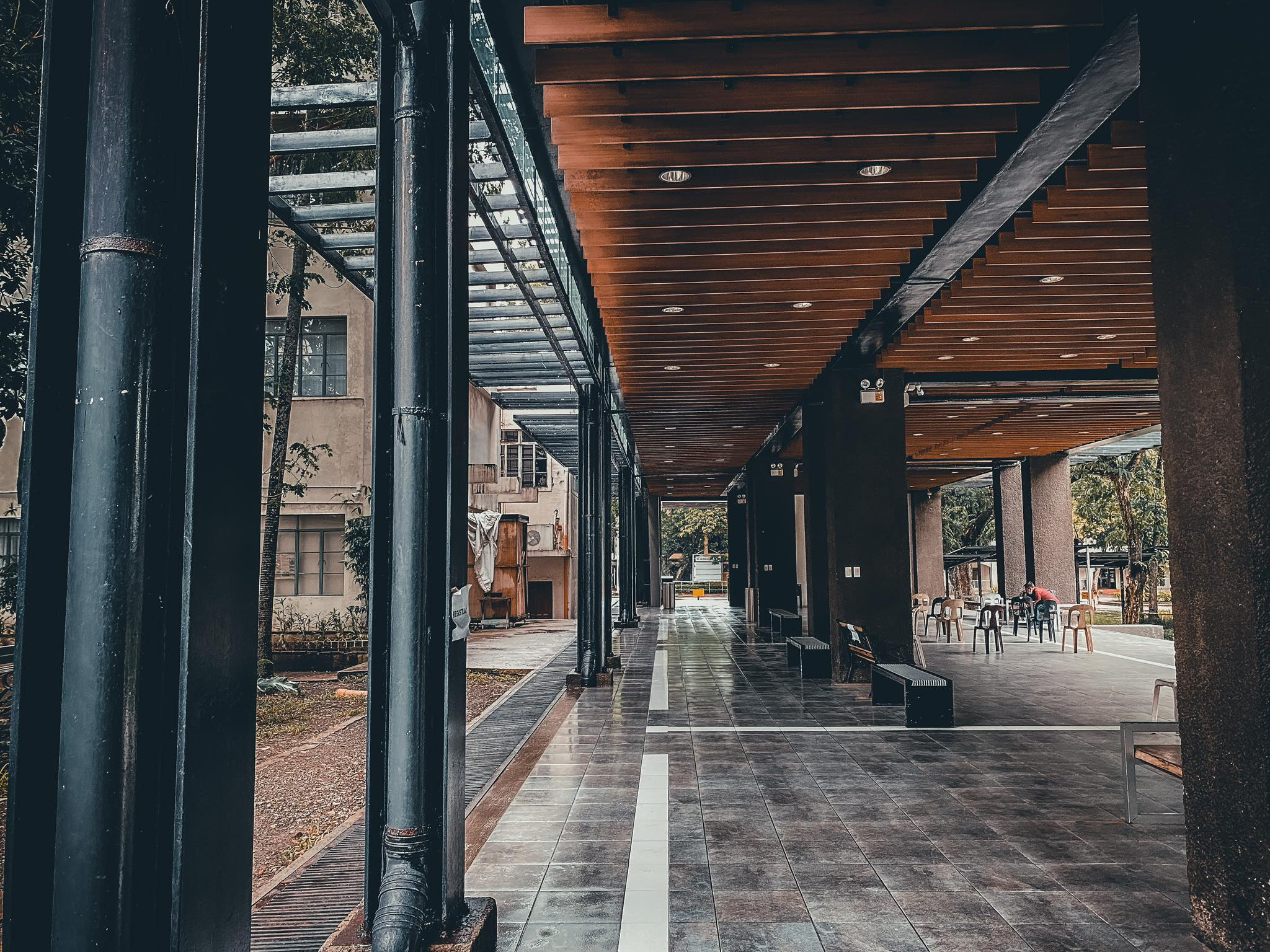
Interior of the university

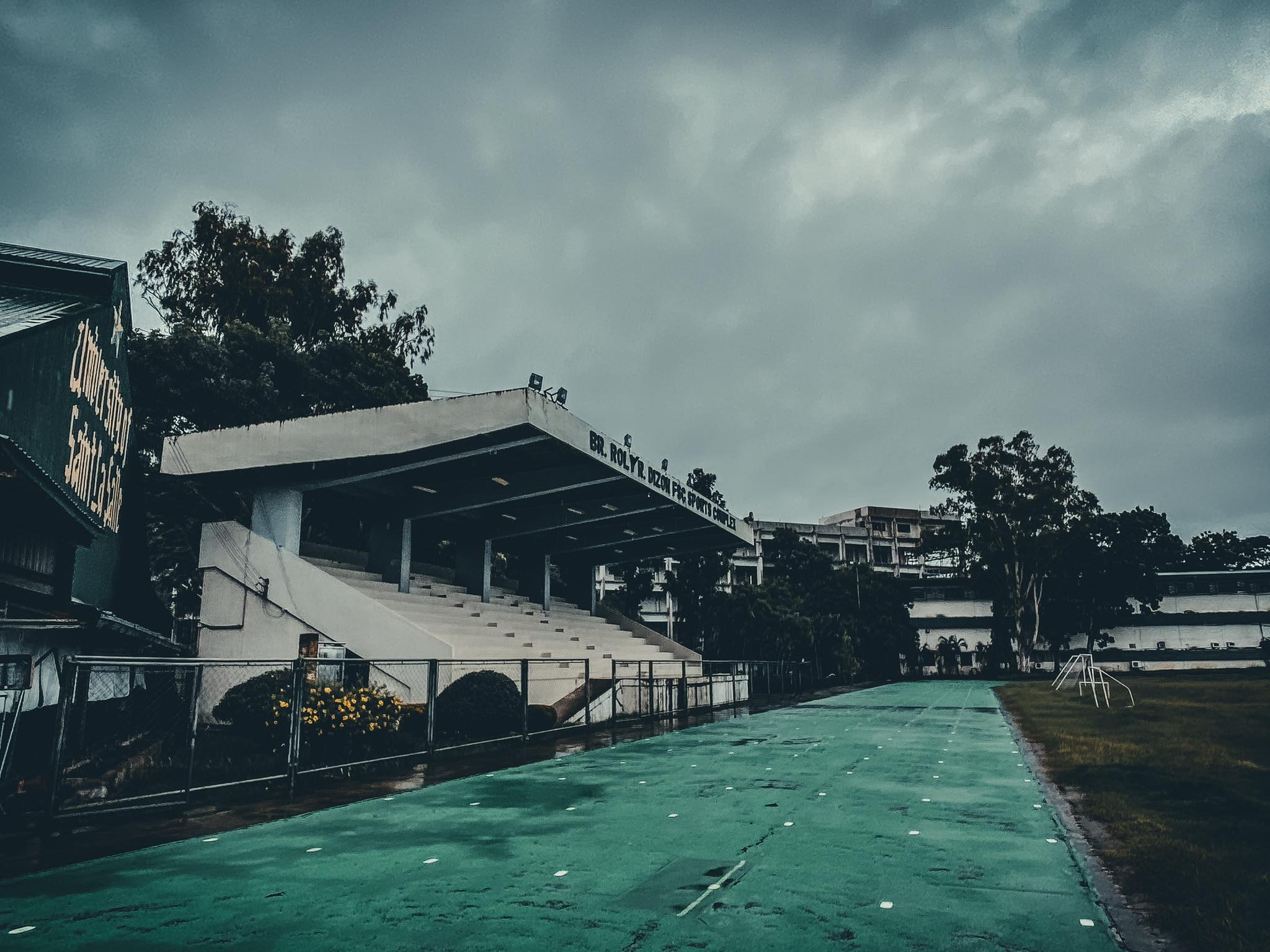
Br. Roly R. Dizon, FSC Sports Complex

== See also ==
- List of tertiary schools in Bacolod
