= Samahang Weightlifting ng Pilipinas =

- Sport: Weightlifting
- Abbreviation: SWP
- President: Monico Puentevella
- (Philippines)

The Samahang Weightlifting ng Pilipinas or the SWP (formerly known as the Philippine Weightlifting Association) is the national governing body for weightlifting and powerlifting in the Philippines. The president of the SWP since October 2016 is Monico Puentevella.
