= Anthony Golez =

Filipino politician and medical doctor

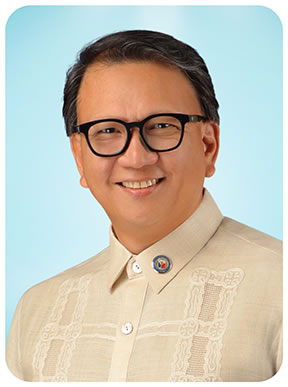
- Official portrait, 2022

Member of the Philippine House of Representatives for Malasakit at Bayanihan Party List
- In office June 30, 2022 – June 30, 2025
- Succeeded by: Girlie Veloso

Member of the Philippine House of Representatives from Bacolod's Lone District
- In office June 30, 2010 – June 30, 2013
- Preceded by: Monico Puentevella
- Succeeded by: Evelio Leonardia

Personal details
- Born: Anthony Rolando Torillo Golez Jr. September 9, 1972 (age 54) Manila, Philippines
- Party: NPC (2009–2013)
- Spouse: Katherine Key L. Golez
- Children: 4
- Education: University of Santo Tomas; Ateneo Graduate School of Business
- Occupation: Politician, Medical doctor

Anthony Rolando Torillo Golez Jr. (born September 9, 1972) is a Filipino politician and former representative of the Malasakit at Bayanihan Foundation, a party-list in the House of Representatives of the Philippines from 2022 to 2025. He previously served as the representative for the Lone District of Bacolod City in 2010. Prior to that, he was the Presidential Spokesperson at the Office of the President in 2009. He was also the senior deputy press secretary at the Office of the President in 2008, senior deputy presidential spokesperson and undersecretary at the Office of the President in 2007, and the government spokesperson for disaster management at the National Disaster Coordinating Council in 2005.

== Congressional career ==
As the representative of the Lone District of Bacolod in 2010, he voted against the passing of the Reproductive Health Bill and took the side of the Catholic Church. In 2011, he signed the impeachment complaint against Chief Justice Renato Corona. And in 2012, Golez filed a resolution that urged then President Benigno Aquino III, the Cultural Center of the Philippines (CPP), and the National Commission for Culture and the Arts to bestow the National Artist award to Nora Aunor for her "contributions to Philippine Arts".

As the representative of the Malasakit at Bayanihan Foundation party-list group, he filed House Bill No. 1709 to propose a measure that would make vote-buying a heinous crime and be punishable with jail time. He also filed House Bill No. 6029 that standardizes wage and benefits for rescue workers.

== Personal life ==
Golez is a physician. His first wife, former Tawi-tawi representative Soraya Jaafar-Golez, filed for the annulment of their marriage in September 2012. Jaafar also requested a temporary protection order from the Regional Trial Court for Quezon City in 2012 against her husband to keep him away from her and their daughter at their house in Bacolod.
