= Granada, Bacolod =

Granada
- Barangay
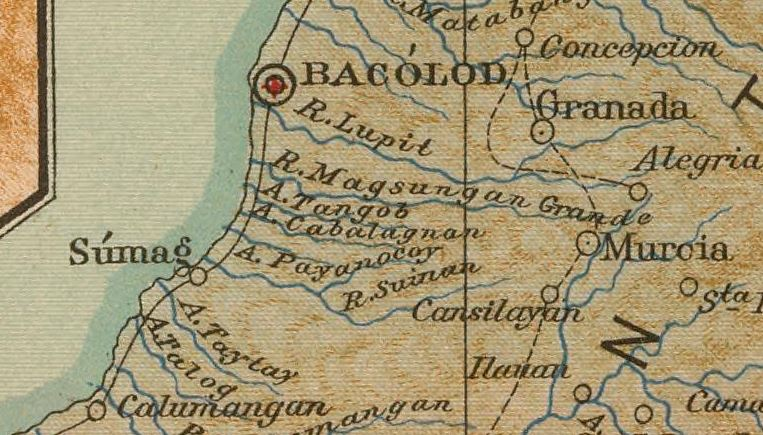
- 1899 U.S. Coast and Geodetic Survey showing Granada as a separate town.
- Interactive map of Granada
- Location in the Philippines
- Coordinates: 10°40′8.256″N 123°2′13.567″E
- Country: Philippines
- Region: Negros Island Region
- Province: Negros Occidental (geographically only)
- City: Bacolod
- Established: 1854 (Town)
- Incorporated: 1902 (to Bacolod)

Government
  - Mayor: Albee B. Benitez (PDP–Laban) (Mayor of Bacolod)
  - Chairman: Armando M. Vito

Area
  - Total: 29.84621 km^{2} (11.52369 sq mi)
- Elevation: 100 to 250 m (330 to 820 ft)

Population (2020)
  - Total: 31,867
  - Density: 1,086/km^{2} (2,810/sq mi)
- Demonym: Granadanhon
- Time zone: UTC+8 (PST)
- Patron Saint: Our Lady of Lourdes
- Feast Day: February 18
- Website: www.bacolodcity.gov.ph

Granada is a former town and constituent barangay of Bacolod. Located on the easternmost portion of the city, it borders Northern Negros Natural Park.

== History ==
Granada traces its earliest history during the height of the Moro raids in the Visayas when the settlement of Magsungay, the precursor of the present-day Bacolod, was abandoned after the attack by Moro forces under Datu Bantílan of Sulu on July 14, 1755. The rolling hills characterizing the area inspired the name "Bacolod" from the Hiligaynon word "buklod," meaning "hilly terrain."

=== Establishment ===
When the townsfolk came back to the old Magsungay settlement in 1788 to establish the pueblo of Bacolod, a smaller village was left and the place was called "Kamingawan", which is Hiligaynon for "place of sorrows," due to the silence left by the population decrease. However, Kamingawan was created as a pueblo in its own right, renamed "Granada" in 1854 with Aquilino Sausao as the first Presidente municipal.

=== Dissolution ===
It was dissolved, along with the town of Sum-ag, and incorporated to Bacolod in 1902 upon the dissolution of the Republic of Negros and the reorganization initiated by the American Insular Government of the Philippine Islands.

== Present area ==
Currently, the land area of modern Granada is significantly smaller than the original town. Alangilan, Vista Alegre and Estefania were constituent territories carved out from Granada, leaving it as the most rural barangay of Granada.

Granada is home to some prominent business like San Miguel Brewery and a reservoir of the Bacolod City Water District, supplying a fraction of the city's water supply. Granada Public Cemetery also boasts of being the oldest continuously-used cemetery in Bacolod City, dating back to its inception as a town.

=== Educational ===
Emiliano Lizares National High School School serves the primary needs of the community, along with Generoso Villanueva, Sr. National High School. The La Salle Brothers supervises the Fr. Gratian Murray, AFSC Integrated School a charity, co-educational institution named after a former La Salle Brother and priest, operating adjunct with the Bacolod Boy's Home. While the sole tertiary institution is Maranatha Bible Baptist College, a Baptist seminary run by Maranatha Baptist Church.

=== Tourism ===
Santa Fe Resort, a pre-war private resthouse instituted as a resort in 1950, is found in Granada and is considered the oldest resort in Bacolod. It houses a zoo, Olympic pool, shooting range and cabanas for overnight stays, with a reception hall for private events. The Bantug-owned Bantug Lake Ranch is partly-situated in the area, along with Barangay Alangilan, surrounded by an artificial lake that once served as a reservoir for the family's farm.

== Demographics ==
Being the former main parish of Bacolod, Granada residents are predominantly Roman Catholic, served by the Our Lady of Lourdes Parish Church. It also has a strong Baptist presence, with a seminary situated in the outskirts. Iglesia ni Cristo, a Mormon mission and other groups like the maintains a significant congregation in the area.
