= Magsungay, Bacolod =

Magsungay
- Former Town; City District
- Location in the Philippines
- Coordinates: 10°40′8.256″N 123°2′13.567″E
- Country: Philippines
- Region: Negros Island Region
- Province: Negros Occidental (geographically only)
- City: Bacolod
- Established: 1575 (settlement); 1755 (town)
- Incorporated: 1788 (as Bacolod)

Government
  - Mayor: Albee Benitez (PDP Laban) (as Mayor of Bacolod)

Area
  - Total: 29.84621 km^{2} (11.52369 sq mi)
- Elevation: −2 to 6 m (−6.6 to 19.7 ft)

Population
  - Total: 18,923
  - Density: 634/km^{2} (1,640/sq mi)
- Demonym: Magsungaynon
- Time zone: UTC+8 (PST)
- Patron Saint: San Sebastian
- Feast Day: January 20
- Website: www.bacolodcity.gov.ph

Magsungay is a former town and predecessor settlement to the current highly urbanized city of Bacolod.

== History ==
Magsungay started as a visita or a religious mission of the neighboring town of Bago in 1575, named San Sebastian de Magsungay. It was named after the river delta that forms a shape of a horn, or "sungay" in Hiligaynon. However, at the height of the Moro raids in the Visayas, the settlement of Magsungay was abandoned after the attack by forces under Datu Bantílan of Sulu on July 14, 1755. Townsfolk moved to an area inland area characterized with higher elevation to avoid Moro raids, which later became the town of Granada.

The town was reestablished as the pueblo of Bacolod in 1788, with the original townsite incorporated with a now larger poblacion. Magsungay lent its patron saint, San Sebastian as the patron saint of Bacolod.

== Present area ==
Magsungay was a former constituent barangay until it was divided between Barangay Singcang, the location of the old airport, and numbered urban Barangays 10–16. Hence, Singcang is also alternatively called as "Magsungay," as the largest barangay occupying the territory of Magsungay, now roughly an informal city district.

=== Commerce ===
About 35 hectares of land is owned by the Araneta Group under the Progressive Development Corporation, while a significant portion is partly occupied by the Bacolod Real Estate Development Corporation as a reclaimed port and SM City Bacolod, occupying an area west of Mambulac Creek.

=== Education ===
Education and Training Center School 4 (ETCS-4), a public elementary school run by the City Government of Bacolod, occupies a city-owned property in the reclamation area.
