= Alfredo Montelibano Sr. =

Filipino politician and industrialist

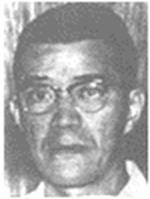

Secretary of National Defense and the Interior
- In office July 11, 1945 – May 27, 1946
- President: Sergio Osmeña
- Preceded by: Tomas Cabili
- Succeeded by: Ruperto Kangleon

Military Governor of Negros and Siquijor Islands
- In office 1942–1945

Mayor of Bacolod
- In office 1938–1941

Personal details
- Born: December 20, 1905 Silay, Negros Occidental, Philippine Islands
- Died: August 19, 1989 (aged 83) Philippines
- Spouse(s): Corazón Unson Locsin; Leticia Ledesma
- Children: 6
- Education: University of the Philippines
- Occupation: Politician, industrialist

Alfredo Montelibano Montelibano Sr. (December 20, 1905 – August 19, 1989) was a Filipino politician and industrialist. He served as the first mayor of Bacolod in 1938, as military governor of Negros and Siquijor Islands from 1942 to 1945, and as Secretary of National Defense and Interior under President Sergio Osmeña from 1945 to 1946.

He was an alumnus of the University of the Philippines.

Montelíbano was President of the Planters Products Inc., Chamber of Agriculture and Natural Resources of the Philippines; Board Chairman of Pacwood Inc. and Rizal Youth Development Foundation Inc.

Country Bankers Insurance & Surety Co.; Country Bankers Life Insurance; Ferro-Cement Philippine Inc.; Philippine President Lines and Modular Concrete Structures Inc.

Chairman, Import Control Commission, 1951; Administrator, Office of Economic Coordination, 1954–1955; Chairman, National Economic Council, 1955–1956; and Chairman-General Manager, Rice and Corn Administration, 1968–1971.

Board Chairman of Meralco Securities Corporation; Philippine Commercial & Industrial Bank; Farm Machinery Corporation; Insular Veneer Inc.; Pacific Woodworks International Inc.; Republic Real Estate Corporation; Hotel Enterprises of the Philippines Inc.; ABS-CBN Broadcasting Corporation.

Chairman-President of Capitol Subdivision Inc.; President, National Federation of Sugarcane Planters; and Senior Vice-President, Manila Electric Co.

== Personal life ==
He was born to Alejandro Montelíbano and Liceria Montelíbano in Silay City. He first married Corazón Unson Locsin whom which he has four sons and two daughters – Corazon, Ting, Alfredo Jr., Rudolfo, Roberto, and Oscar. Two of his children, Alfredo L. Montelibano Jr. and Roberto L. Montelibano, entered into the world of politics.

After his first wife died he then married Leticia Ledesma in 1964.

== Awards and citations ==
1. Ph.D. in economics (honoris causa), De La Salle College, Bacolod, 1962; model Mayor Award, 1983; Model Employer, 1950.

2. AFP Legion of Honor, commander's rank, 1952; Rural Banker of the Year, Business Writers Association of the Philippines, 1954; Negrense of the Year, Negros Press Club, 1959; Businessman of the Year, BWAP, 1960; Business Leader of the Year, Negros press Club, 1960;

3. Model and Most Creative Citizen of 1961, Philippine Institute of Public Opinion;

4. Awards for invaluable contribution as civic leader, industrialist and economist, Manila Suburban Press Club, 1962;

5. For outstanding achievement as chairman of Philippine Commercial and Industrial Bank, Philippine Chamber of Independent Publishers, 1962;

6. As distinguished economist and entrepreneur and as president of the Chamber of Agriculture & Natural resources, Bureau of Animal Industry, 1965; Good Citizenship Award, Community Chest of Greater Manila, 1962;

7. Awards for heroic services as a resistance leader in World War II, 1965; as Defense Secretary, Confederation of Filipino Veterans, 1966; and as war veteran from Negros Veterans Association, 1966;

8. Industrialist Award, Textile Association of the Philippines, 1966; Banker award, Philippine Chamber of Engineering Services, 1976;

9. Agriculturist, economist, industrialist and civic leader award, Labor Day Celebration Executive Committee, May 1, 1967;

10. For outstanding services to the National Federation of Sugarcane Planters, 1968;

11. As one of 12 most outstanding public officials for 1970, Philippine Confederation of Labor Inc., 1971;

12. For unselfish support to the cause of agriculture from the Agriculture and Rural Broadcasters Organization Inc., 1972; "Sakara" award, Philippine Sugar Institute, 1976; Father of Rural Banking Award, Rural Bankers Association of the Philippines, 1976; and "Gintong Ani Award", Department of Agriculture, 1976.
