= Sum-ag, Bacolod =

Sum-ag
- Barangay
- Nickname: "Southern Gateway of Bacolod"
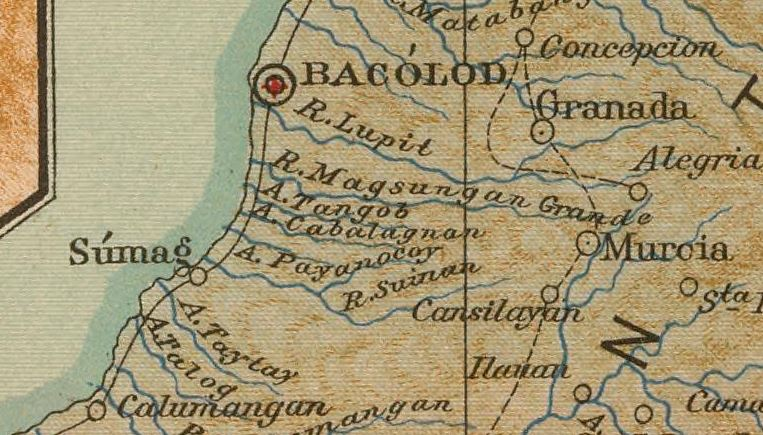
- 1899 U.S. Coast and Geodetic Survey showing Sum-ag as a separate town.
- Interactive map of Sum-ag
- Location in the Philippines
- Coordinates: 10°36′2.685″N 122°55′36.703″E
- Country: Philippines
- Region: Negros Island Region
- Province: Negros Occidental (geographically only)
- City: Bacolod
- Established: 1780 (Town)
- Incorporated: 1902 (to Bacolod)

Government
  - Mayor: Greg G. Gasataya (PDP–Laban) (Mayor of Bacolod)
  - Chairman: Rodney Carmona

Area
  - Total: 4.11 km^{2} (1.59 sq mi)
- Highest elevation: 6 m (20 ft)
- Lowest elevation: −2 m (−6.6 ft)

Population
  - Total: 20,456
  - Density: 4,205/km^{2} (10,890/sq mi)
- Demonym: Sum-aganon
- Time zone: UTC+8 (PST)
- Patron Saint: San Juan de Nepomuceno
- Feast Day: May 16
- Website: www.bacolodcity.gov.ph

Sum-ag is a former town and constituent barangay of Bacolod. Located in the southernmost section of the city, it is considered the southern gateway of Bacolod.

== History ==
Sum-ag was instituted as a pueblo in 1780, with Don Andres Claridad as the first presidente municipal. It was created as a pueblo in 1803 by former Alcalde-Mayor Don Manuel Valdevieso. Originally known as “Pueblo de Sum-ag," its territory consists of the present-day barangays of Felisa, Tangub, Cansilayan, Pahonocoy, Taloc, Punta Taytay, Tabunan, and Dulao.

After the dissolution of the Republic of Negros, in 1902, petitions were made for the creation of new municipalities in Negros Occidental, particularly those of Murcia, Bago, and Bacolod. Under the reorganization initiated by the American Insular Government of the Philippine Islands. Sum-ag was incorporated as a barrio of Bacolod. Four bangays (Taloc, Tabunan, Abuanan, and Dulao) were given to Bago, while Cansilayan was augmented to Murcia.

== Present day ==
Historically, the territory of Sum-ag included the modern-day barangays of Tangub, Pahonocoy, Punta Taytay, Cabug, Handumanan, and Felisa in Bacolod, Abuanan, Taloc, Tabuanan, and Dulao in Bago, and Cansilayan in Murcia. until these separated to form their own. It is bounded by the barangays of Punta Taytay to the west, Cabug to the east, and Pahonocoy to the north. Being one of Bacolod’s southernmost barangays, the city of Bago directly bounds it to the south. To this day, Sum-ag remains the main commercial and educational hub in southern Bacolod.

=== Educational ===
Sum-ag Elementary School serves the primary needs of the community, along with nearby Sum-ag National High School. The Benedictine Sisters of St. Scholastica run Holy Family Vocational School in Sum-ag as a charity, co-educational institution. VMA Global College and Bacolod City College Sum-ag Campus serve the tertiary educational needs of the residents. Christian Venture Academy Ministries Incorporated or more formerly known as Goodie Kids School is a non-profit private school that existed in Sum-ag since 1983.

=== Tourism ===
Its proximity to the seashore made Sum-ag a weekend destination for Bacolod residents, along with nearby Punta-Taytay. However, Sum-ag River, which bisects the barangay is currently being developed as a cruising destination and natural preservation. The river is home to a small fishing wharf and a water transport facility for Coca-Cola Bottlers Philippines.

== Demographics ==
Sum-ag residents are predominantly Roman Catholic and adherents are currently served by the San Juan de Nepomuceno Parish Church. However, there is a strong Protestant presence in the area, most notably Sum-ag Evangelical Church. It is home to the provincial offices of the Philippine Convention of Baptist Churches and the Adventist Church in the Philippines.

Iglesia ni Cristo and The Church of Jesus Christ of Latter-day Saints (commonly known as the Mormons) have a small congregation in Sum-ag or formally known as the Sum-ag Ward under the Bacolod South Stake.
