= Greg Gasataya =

Filipino politician (born 1970)

Greg G. Gasataya
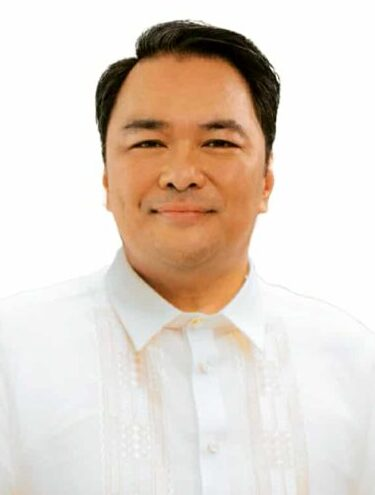
- Official portrait, 2025

44th Mayor of Bacolod
- Incumbent
- Assumed office June 30, 2025
- Vice Mayor: Kalaw Puentevella
- Preceded by: Albee Benitez

Member of the Philippine House of Representatives from Bacolod's Lone District
- In office June 30, 2016 – June 30, 2025
- Preceded by: Bing Leonardia
- Succeeded by: Albee Benitez

Acting Mayor of Bacolod
- In office November 16, 2015 – February 15, 2016
- Vice Mayor: El Cid Familiaran
- Preceded by: Monico Puentevella
- Succeeded by: Bing Leonardia

Vice Mayor of Bacolod
- In office June 30, 2013 – June 30, 2016
- Mayor: Monico Puentevella
- Preceded by: Jude Thaddeus Sayson
- Succeeded by: El Cid Familiaran

Member of the Bacolod City Council
- In office June 30, 2001 – June 30, 2010

Personal details
- Born: Greg Gelvosa Gasataya; November 19, 1970 (age 55) Bacolod, Philippines
- Party: NPC (2007–present); Asenso Bacolod (2022–present) (local party)
- Other political affiliations: Lakas (2001–2007); Grupo Progreso (2007–2021) (local party)
- Spouse(s): Odette Montelibano (annulled); Maita Tionko-Gasataya (present)
- Children: 3 (includes 1 stepdaughter)
- Education: University of the Philippines Diliman
- Occupation: Politician
- Profession: Broadcast journalist
- Website: www.facebook.com/RepGregGasataya

Greg Gelvosa Gasataya (born November 19, 1970) is a Filipino politician and former broadcast journalist who served as the Representative of the Lone District of Bacolod from 2016 to 2025. He was elected as Mayor of Bacolod in the 2025 elections and assumed the office on June 30.

== Early years ==
=== Early life ===
Greg Gasataya was born as the eldest son to Rodrigo Gasataya, a jeepney driver, and Thelma Gelvosa, a church worker on November 19, 1970, in Bacolod, Philippines.

=== Education ===
Gasataya graduated from the West Negros College for his elementary education in 1984 and as valedictorian from the Maranatha Christian School for his secondary education in 1988.

In 1988, Gasataya entered the University of the Philippines Diliman, earning a degree of Bachelor of Arts in Political Science.

In 2009, he finished his Bachelor of Arts in Communication Arts from the Philippine Women's University. Gasataya also earned a Master's in Public Management from the Sultan Kudarat State University in 2011.

=== Early career ===
Gasataya worked as a broadcast journalist, first as a reporter, then as anchorman, for Bombo Radyo Philippines prior to his entry into the political arena.

== Personal life ==
Gasataya has a daughter named Gabrielle "Gabie" from his ex-wife Odette Montelibano who is currently based in Canada. Gasataya is currently married to Maita Tionko-Gasataya, whom together has a son named RD. Gasataya is also the stepfather of incumbent Bacolod barangay captain Inday Franz Gasataya Tionko (born Franz Hughanne Ramos Tionko), his current wife's daughter from a previous relationship.

== Political career ==
=== City Councilor of Bacolod (2001–2010) ===
On the 2001 Philippine general election, Gasataya successfully ran for the position of City Councilor of Bacolod City, ranking ninth among the candidates.

The 2004 Philippine general election saw Gasataya lead the candidates on a successful re-election campaign as Bacolod City Councilor. During his term as City Councilor, Gasataya was chairman of the SP Committees on Education and Fire, Natural Disasters and Calamities.

Gasataya once again lead the candidates for his third and final run as Bacolod City Councilor during the 2007 Philippine general election.

=== Vice Mayor of Bacolod (2013–2016) ===
After taking a break from politics from 2010 to 2013, Gasataya returned to the political scene and was elected as the Vice Mayor of the City of Bacolod during the 2010 Philippine general election.

=== Acting Mayor of Bacolod (2015–2016) ===
The Department of the Interior and Local Government implemented the 90-day suspension order issued by the Sandiganbayan on Bacolod City Mayor Monico Puentevella in connection with the graft case filed against him during his time as congressman.

With Puentevella’s suspension, the DILG appointed Gasataya and Councilor El Cid Familiaran as acting mayor and vice mayor, respectively.

=== House of Representatives (2016–2025) ===
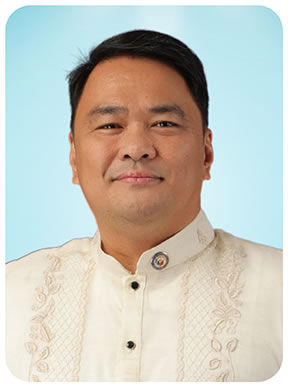
Portrait of Gasataya during his term as Bacolod representative in the 19th Congress

In 2016, Gasataya ran as the representative of the Lone District of Bacolod under the Nationalist People's Coalition and won.

Gasataya served his third term as representative of the Lone District of Bacolod during the 19th Congress.

From 2023 to 2025, Gastaya received ₱5.1 billion of "allocable" funds from the national budget. These "Allocable" funds have been criticized by the People’s Budget Coalition as a new form of pork barrel, since it goes to "politically determined projects that crowd out more equitable and accountable public spending"

In late December, Gasataya, who assumed the office of Mayor at this point, was mentioned in the controversial “Cabral Files” released by Congressman Leandro Leviste. When he was asked about it, Gasataya chose not to comment and instead greeted the media a "Happy New Year."

=== Mayor of Bacolod (2025–present) ===
In 2025, Gasataya ran as Bacolod's mayor in the 2025 local elections and won against his former ally and Vice Mayor El Cid Familiaran. He is now the 44th mayor of Bacolod.

As mayor, Gasataya has actively pushed for smoother traffic and cleaner markets, as well as preventing flooding through various projects. However, the latter has come under heavy scrutiny after ineffective flood control projects worth ₱4.28 billion failed to minimize the flooding from Tropical Storm Verbana (Koto) and Typhoon Tino (Kalmaegi), leading to the Department of Public Works and Highways (DPWH) reviewing said the projects, which were handled by the Legacy Construction Corporation.

Under his administration, the members of the Bagong Alyansang Makabayan staged a protest in September 2025, in front of the DPWH-Bacolod office, claiming that some ₱7 billion had been allocated for flood control projects, as "the city continues to suffer from severe flooding that threatens the safety of residents."

Political offices
Preceded by Albee Benitez	Mayor of Bacolod; 2025–present	Incumbent
Preceded by Jude Thaddeus Sayson	Vice Mayor of Bacolod; 2013–2016	Succeeded by El Cid Familiaran
House of Representatives of the Philippines
Preceded by Bing Leonardia	Member of the Philippine House of Representatives from the Lone District of Bacolod; 2016-2025	Succeeded by Albee Benitez
