= Bacolod City Council =

Local government body in the Philippines

Bacolod City Council Sangguniang Panlungsod ng Bacolod Consejo sang Dakbanwa sang Bacolod
- 14th Sangguniang Panlungsod of Bacolod
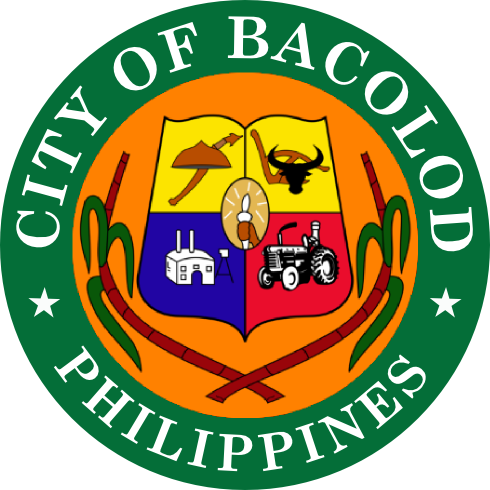

Type
- Type: Unicameral
- Term limits: 3 terms (9 years)

History
- Founded: October 19, 1938

Leadership
- Presiding Officer: Vice Mayor El Cid Familiaran, Nacionalista since June 30, 2022
- Majority Floor Leader: Al Victor Espino, NPC since June 30, 2022
- Minority Floor Leader: Israel Salanga, Nacionalista since June 30, 2022

Structure
- Seats: 12 councilors; 2 ex officio members; 1 ex officio presiding officer
- Political groups: Majority bloc (8): Team Asenso Minority bloc (4): Grupo Progreso Non-partisan (2)
- Length of term: 3 years
- Authority: Bacolod City Charter; Local Government Code of the Philippines

Elections
- Voting system: Plurality-at-large voting (12 seats); Indirect elections (2 seats)
- Last election: May 9, 2022
- Next election: May 12, 2025

Meeting place
- Bacolod City Government Center

Website
- https://www.bacolodcity.gov.ph

The Bacolod City Council (Filipino: Sangguniang Panlungsod ng Bacolod; Hiligaynon: Consejo sang Dakbanwa sang Bacolod) is the legislature of Bacolod City, Philippines. The legislative body is composed of 14 councilors, with 12 councilors elected from Bacolod's at-large district and two elected from the ranks of barangay (neighborhood) chairmen and the Sangguniang Kabataan (youth councils). The council's presiding officer is the vice-mayor, elected by the city at-large. The council creates laws and ordinances applicable within the jurisdiction of Bacolod City, although the Mayor of Bacolod can veto proposed bills, the council can override the veto with a two-thirds supermajority.

== History ==
By virtue of the Commonwealth Act No. 326, signed into law by President Manuel Quezon on July 18, 1938, Bacolod became a chartered city. The previous municipal council acted as a temporary city council until the de jure Bacolod City Council held its inaugural session, led by the first City Vice Mayor Jose M. Millarez.

== Seat ==
The council sits at the Bacolod City Government Center, since it transferred in August 2008. Previously, the Bacolod City Council met at the Old Bacolod City Hall located at the city's downtown area.

== Membership ==
Bacolod City voters elect members of the city council using the plurality-at-large voting, where the electorate votes up to twelve council members. Barangay and SK chairs throughout the city each elect a representative to the council, for a total of 18 councilors. City-council elections are synchronized with other elections in the country, which have been held on the second Monday of May every third year since 1992.

=== Current members of the Sangguniang Panlungsod ===
- Presiding officer: Vice Mayor El Cid Familiaran
- Elected members (2022):
  - Jude Thaddeus Sayson
  - Israel P. Salanga
  - Cindy T. Rojas
  - Em L. Ang
  - Al Victor Espino
  - Vladimir Gonzales
  - Renecito S. Novero
  - Jason Villarosa
  - Claudio Jesus Puentevella
  - Simplicia Z. Distrito
  - Celia Flor
  - Psyche Marie Sy
- Ex-officio members:
  - Lady Gles Gonzales Pallen (ABC President)
  - Ayesha Joy Villaflor (SK President)

== Powers, duties, and functions ==
The council, as the city's legislative body, is mandated by the Local Government Code of 1991 to enact ordinances; approve resolutions; appropriate funds for the welfare of the city and its inhabitants (pursuant to Section 16 of the Local Government Code), and ensure the proper exercise of the city's corporate powers (as provided under Section 22 of the Local Government Code). It has the following duties and functions:

- Approving ordinances and passing resolutions necessary for an efficient and effective city government;
- Generating and maximizing the use of resources and revenue for the city's development plans, program objectives and priorities as provided for under Section 18 of the Local Government Code, with particular attention to agricultural and industrial development and citywide growth and progress;
- Enacting ordinances granting franchises and authorizing the issuance of permits or licenses, subject to Book II of the Local Government Code;
- Regulating activities related to land use, buildings, and other structures in the city to promote the general welfare of its inhabitants;
- Approving ordinances which ensure the efficient delivery of basic services and facilities as provided under Section 17 of the Local Government Code, and
- Exercising other powers and performing other duties and functions as prescribed by law.

== See also ==
- Sangguniang Panlungsod
- Manila City Council
- Cebu City Council
