= Monico Puentevella =

Filipino politician (born 1946)

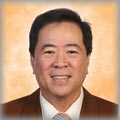
- Official portrait, 2007

Mayor of Bacolod
- In office June 30, 2013 – June 30, 2016
- Vice Mayor: Greg Gasataya
- Preceded by: Evelio Leonardia
- Succeeded by: Evelio Leonardia

Member of the House of Representatives from Bacolod's district
- In office June 30, 2001 – June 30, 2010
- Preceded by: Juan Orola Jr.
- Succeeded by: Anthony Golez

Personal details
- Born: Monico Ogtong Puentevella; July 2, 1946 (age 80) Bacolod, Negros Occidental, Philippine Commonwealth
- Party: Lakas/Lakas–CMD (until 2012; 2018–present); Asenso Bacolod (2021–present) (local party)
- Other political affiliations: NUP (2015–2018); Independent (2012–2015); Partido MKK (2012–2021) (local party)
- Spouse: Josefa Alunan
- Education: De La Salle University (BA)
- Nickname: Potsu

Monico Ogtong Puentevella (born 2 July 1946 in Bacolod, Negros Occidental) is a Filipino politician. Formerly a member of Lakas-Kampi-CMD, he was elected to three terms as a member of the House of Representatives of the Philippines, representing the Lone district of Bacolod. He was first elected to Congress in 2001, and was re-elected in 2004 and 2007. He was also the mayor of Bacolod from 2013 to 2016.

== Education ==
He finished both his elementary and secondary education at the De La Salle Bacolod in 1962 and 1965, respectively. He obtained his Bachelor of Arts in Political Science degree from De La Salle University Manila in 1960. He further pursued Professional Management Development Program study at the Asian Institute of Management in 1994.

== Media career ==
Puentevella had been a contributing writer for Manila Bulletin newspaper and Sports Weekly Magazine and Program host for West Negros Radio Station in 1967. He also became part of the television world when he hosted "Monico and Friends" and "Awit ng Tanghalan" in ABS-CBN Broadcasting Corporation, and "Monico" (he also produced) in RPN TV 8.

== Sports career ==
Prior to his election to Congress, Puentevella served as a Commissioner of the Philippine Sports Commission from 1996 to 2001.

Puentevella served as the president of the Philippine Weightlifting Association (PWA) until 2013, when he resigned from the post upon becoming Mayor of Bacolod. He then held the title president emeritus after his resignation until he was re-elected again to the post in October 2016. He succeeded Roger Dullano, who irrevocably resigned to go to the United States due to concerns related family related issues.

He is set to be induced to the IWF Hall of Fame on June 25, 2022, for his contribution as a sport official.

On June 11, Puentevella led the opening ceremony of the 2024 National Weightlifting Championships at the SM Seaside City. It was hosted by Cebu City and sponsored by International Container Terminal Services. It will run until June 16 with 300 weightlifters to contest 36 weight categories guided by Olympic coaches Ramón Solis and Christopher Bureros.

== Political career ==
Puentevella authored thirteen National Laws including the Quarantine Act of 2004, the Cheaper Medicines Law, the Civil Aviation Authority of the Philippines Law and the Alternative Fuel Act of 2004, among others. He also helped authored and co-authored at least 586 house bills and resolutions of Local and National importance. Puentevella also became Chairman of the Philippine Olympic Committee, Commissioner of the Philippine Sports Commission and the current Marketing and Television Committee Director of the Federation International de Football Association (FIFA).

His son Claudio Jesus Raymundo "Kalaw" A. Puentevella is the incumbent Vice Mayor and a former city councilor in Bacolod. His other son Monico “Nicky” A. Puentevella Jr. was appointed as Director of John Hay Management Corporation in 2017.

=== Mayor of Bacolod ===
He was elected as mayor of Bacolod in 2013.

In 2015, Puentevella was suspended for 90-days which started on November 16 and was charged with violation of the Anti-Graft and Corrupt Practices Act (Republic Act 3019) for the alleged overpriced purchase of IT packages worth P26 million using his Priority Development Assistance Funds when he was congressman from 2002 to 2007. These IT packages were for public elementary and secondary schools in Bacolod. Also charged with Puentevella were the late Victorino Tirol, former Department of Education Western Visayas director; and Merryland Publishing chairman Jessie Garcia, supplier of the IT packages. Puentevella denied the accusations and questioned the validity of the information filed against him, however he willfully accepted the suspension with no reported hesitation. As a result, while Puentevella served his suspension, Bacolod Vice Mayor Greg Gasataya sat as acting mayor and Councilor El Cid Familiaran as vice mayor.

The Sandiganbayan’s 90-day preventive suspension of Puentevella over graft charges ended on February 14, 2016 and Puentevella was able to return to his previous post as Bacolod City Mayor. Puentevella ran for Mayoralty re-election on the 2016 Philippine local elections but lost to Evelio "Bing" Leonardia.

It was reported on June 23, 2016, that the Ombudsman ordered a one-month suspension against Puentevella due to failure to immediately suspend two Bacolod City building officials. In July 2014, the Ombudsman ordered the suspension of two building officials after finding them guilty of "conduct prejudicial to the best interest of the service". Puentevella received a directive from the Ombudsman calling for the implementation of the suspension but issued a reply that the officials concerned are to be suspended on January 1, 2015, citing the unilateral move as in line with "the spirit of Christmas". The Ombudsman emphasized on its ruling suspending Puentevella that the earlier suspension order is "immediately effective and executory" and that "there is nothing vague or ambiguous with this wording". The Ombudsman also said that Puentevella has no authority to move the suspension to a different date. Puentevella said that the one-month suspension is "moot and academic" since he is already stepping down from his post as mayor eight days from the date of the report.

== Other involvements ==
Monico also worked as company officer for IPC-Sugar Trading Co., Philsugar, Sugar Planters, RH Fabricators and Designs Inc., and JOSMON Management Co. Inc. He also was an employee at Philippine National Bank.

In 1994, he became the President of Cebu Rolling Hills Memorial Chapels and Rolling Hills Foundation.
