= Albee Benitez =

Filipino politician and businessman (born 1966)

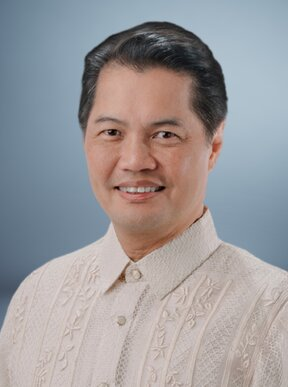
- Official portrait, 2025

Deputy Speaker of the House of Representatives of the Philippines
- Incumbent
- Assumed office March 18, 2026 Serving with several others
- Speaker: Bojie Dy

Member of the Philippine House of Representatives from Bacolod's Lone District
- Incumbent
- Assumed office June 30, 2025
- Preceded by: Greg Gasataya

43rd Mayor of Bacolod
- In office June 30, 2022 – June 30, 2025
- Vice Mayor: El Cid Familiaran
- Preceded by: Evelio Leonardia
- Succeeded by: Greg Gasataya

Member of the Philippine House of Representatives from Negros Occidental's 3rd district
- In office June 30, 2010 – June 30, 2019
- Preceded by: Jose Carlos V. Lacson
- Succeeded by: Jose Francisco Benitez

Personal details
- Born: Alfredo Abelardo Bantug Benitez (Note: Although Benitez was born in the United States, his official documents possess his mother's maiden name, which is Bantug.); December 20, 1966 (age 59) Palo Alto, California, U.S.
- Citizenship: Philippines; United States (until 2009)
- Party: PFP (since 2025); Asenso Bacolod (since 2021) (local party)
- Other political affiliations: Independent (2015–2016, 2024–2025); PDP (2016–2024); Liberal (2010–2015); NPC (2009–2010)
- Spouse: Dominique "Nikki" Lopez (m. 1992)
- Children: 2, including Javi
- Relatives: Jose Francisco Benitez (brother); Helena Benitez (grandaunt); Conrado Benitez (great-grandfather); Francisca Tirona (great-grandmother)
- Education: College of William & Mary (BS)
- Occupation: Politician
- Profession: Businessman
- Website: 2022.albeebenitez.ph

Alfredo Abelardo "Albee" Bantug Benitez (born December 20, 1966) is a Filipino politician and businessman who has served as the representative for Bacolod's lone district since 2025. He previously served as the 43rd mayor of Bacolod from 2022 to 2025 and as the representative for Negros Occidental's third district from 2010 to 2019.

Benitez began his career as a business executive in the gambling industry. He founded Bingo Bonanza in 1993 and AB Leisure in 1994. The two companies became subsidiaries of Leisure & Resorts World Corp., (now DigiPlus) which Benitez would later be the president of from 2005 to 2010 before divesting his business interests to enter politics. He returned to is board of directors in 2019 until 2021 and was the majority shareholder of the company for several years.

Benitez entered the House of Representatives in 2010. During his tenure, he was among the wealthiest members of Congress. In 2018, he was the second-wealthiest member of Congress, amassing a net worth of ₱1.23 billion. He sought the mayoralty of Bacolod in 2022 and won, defeating incumbent mayor Evelio Leonardia. After serving one term, Benitez sought a return to Congress as the representative of Bacolod's lone district.

== Early life and education ==
Benitez was born on December 20, 1966, in Palo Alto, California, United States, to Jose Conrado Benitez who previously served as Deputy Minister of Human Settlements and Betty Bantug, both from Negros Occidental. He went to La Salle Green Hills for primary and secondary education. He then enrolled at the College of William & Mary in Williamsburg, Virginia, and completed a mathematics degree.

== Business career ==
Benitez established Bingo Bonanza Corporation (wherein he was president and CEO) in 1993 and AB Leisure Exponent Inc. (ABLE) in 1994—the latter owning the former. The companies operated bingo parlors throughout the country and later, electronic bingo as well. As of 2001 and 2006, Bingo Bonanza was the largest bingo operator in the Philippines with a 50% market share.

In 1999, the holding company Leisure and Resorts World Corp. (LRWC) acquired ABLE as its wholly owned subsidiary. In 2005, Benitez, then-president of ABLE and a director of LRWC, sold his ₱4.38 million worth of shares in First Cagayan Leisure & Resort Corp. to LRWC. This allowed LRWC to acquire 35% of First Cagayan, the master licensor for online gambling in the Cagayan Special Economic Zone. Benitez became president of LRWC on October 10, 2005. By the end of 2005, LRWC posted a net income of ₱64.1 million and as of mid-2006, LRWC owned 70% of First Cagayan. LRWC then posted a net income of ₱167.9 million for 2007. Benitez stepped down as president of LRWC on June 25, 2010, when he divested himself from his business interests just before starting his term in Congress. However, he remained the company's majority owner.

In July 2019, after completing three consecutive terms in Congress, Benitez returned to LRWC as its chairman. He later became director and committee member until he resigned again in October 2021 to run for mayor of Bacolod. He initially continued to be the company's majority owner, but gradually sold his shares in the company in the succeeding years and lost his majority ownership. In February 2023, LRWC changed its name to DigiPlus Interactive Corporation. At that time, aside from Bingo Bonanza, ABLE, and First Cagayan, its other subsidiaries included Total Gamezone Xtreme Inc., Blue Chip Gaming and Leisure Corp., LR Data Center Solutions Inc., AB Leisure Global Inc., LR Land Developers Inc., Prime Investment Korea Inc., and Hotel Enterprises of the Philippines Inc. By 2024, DigiPlus Interactive's flagship brands were BingoPlus, ArenaPlus, and GameZone. In April 2025, he sold ₱332 million worth of DigiPlus Interactive shares. He retained his 8.35% stake in the company, worth an estimated ₱17.6 billion.

In June 2021, his company Visayas Cockers Club Inc., doing business as Sabong International PH, was one of the four companies licensed to operate online cockfighting ("e-sabong"). However, by May 2022, President Rodrigo Duterte ordered all e-sabong operations to be suspended.

In 2020, Benitez established the production company Brightlight Productions, of which he was president and CEO. In the same year, Brightlight secured blocktimer slots from TV5 and produced shows featuring ABS-CBN talents, after the latter network was shut down by Congress on July 10, 2020.

== Political career ==
=== House of Representatives (2010–2019) ===
Benitez entered Philippine politics in 2010 when he was elected as Liberal representative of Negros Occidental's third district. He had renounced his American citizenship before filing his certificate of candidacy in 2009. He held a satellite congressional office at Talisay.

Benitez began his term on June 30, 2010. During his time in the House of Representatives, Benitez was required to file a statement of assets, liabilities, and net worth (SALN). In 2011, he declared a net worth of ₱686 million, making him the fourth-richest congressman at that time. His last publicized net worth was for 2018, which amounted to ₱1.23 billion, making him the second-richest in Congress behind Mikee Romero.

During his tenure, he helped draft and oversee the passing of the Sugarcane Industry Development Act, a piece of landmark legislation that supports sugarcane farmers. He also implemented a scholarship program. He was also involved in the implementation of various projects in Negros Occidental, such as the Tourism Highway and Loop of Silay, upgrade and beautification of Bacolod–Silay International Airport roads, and the construction of other bridges and barangay hall buildings. He was also notable for his implemented of some house bills at the congress including House Resolution No. 5237, House Resolution No. 875, proposed admin capital city planning act, House Bill no. 85, House Bill no. 84, House Bill no. 82. Benitez initiated the Silay Negros Occidental Convention Center project near the Bacolod-Silay Airport.

Benitez completed his three-term limit in 2019. His younger brother, Jose Francisco Benitez, was elected as his successor. In June 2019, Negros Occidental governor Eugenio Jose Lacson appointed Benitez as the provincial government's consultant for economics and investments. He was serving pro bono.

=== Mayor of Bacolod (2022–2025) ===
On October 5, 2021, Benitez changed his voter address from Victorias to Bacolod and officially announced to his bid for mayor of Bacolod against incumbent mayor and rival Evelio Leonardia in the May 9, 2022, elections. On March 26, 2022, Benitez formally launched his campaign, together with his slate known as Team Asenso or Grupo Asenso, a PDP–Laban led-coalition.

On May 10, 2022, the Commission on Elections declared Benitez elected Mayor of Bacolod.

=== House of Representatives (since 2025) ===
In 2024, Benitez announced his candidacy for congressional bid in Bacolod's lone district under Team Asenso. He faced Leonardia again in the contest. On May 13, 2025, the Commission on Elections proclaimed Benitez the elected representative of Bacolod's lone district.

== Personal life ==
Benitez met Dominique "Nikki" Lopez, an employee of Continental Airlines, at the Euphoria discotheque in Makati in 1992; they married at the Manila Cathedral in Intramuros, Manila, on September 27, 1992. They have two children, including former Victorias mayor and Negros Occidental 3rd district Representative Javier Miguel "Javi" Benitez (born 1994). Benitez's family has resided in Forbes Park, Makati since 2016, while he has maintained residences in Victorias, Negros Occidental, and in Bacolod during his tenures as congressman and mayor.

Benitez is a former national athlete. He became secretary general of the Philippine Badminton Association in 2011. He is the founder of Betty Bantug Benitez Foundation, Inc. in 1982, and the Kaayong Lawas Foundation Hospital.

In August 2024, Benitez filed for the annulment of his marriage with Lopez.

=== Accusations of marital infidelity and abuse ===
In 2024, Benitez publicly apologized after images emerged online of him and actress Ivana Alawi at an airport in Tokyo, fueling speculation of a relationship. Benitez had previously said that he had received an annulment of his marriage to his wife several years prior, which Lopez denied.

In late May 2025, a criminal complaint submitted by Lopez to the Makati prosecutor's office against Benitez surfaced online, where Lopez accused Benitez of committing violence against women and children (VAWC) by causing "severe mental and emotional distress" through his extramarital affairs, including an alleged affair with Alawi, which she had suspected but not confirmed until he filed for annulment. Lopez also alleged that he admitted in his 2024 annulment petition to fathering two illegitimate children with beauty pageant titleholder Daisy Reyes and actress Andrea Del Rosario. Benitez denied his wife's accusations as "baseless and retaliatory" while accusing her of "unnecessarily dragging" a third party into their marital affairs.

== Electoral history ==
Electoral history of Albee Benitez
Year	Office	Party	Votes received				Result
Year	Office	Party	Total	%	P.	Swing	Result
2010	Representative (Negros Occidental–3rd)	NPC	116,772	62.21%	1st	—N/a	Won
2013	Representative (Negros Occidental–3rd)	Liberal	107,422	59.04%	1st	-3.17	Won
2016	Representative (Negros Occidental–3rd)	IND	177,232	90.37%	1st	+31.33	Won
2025	Representative (Bacolod)	IND	164,145	56.96%	1st	—N/a	Won
2022	Mayor of Bacolod	PDP–Laban	171,893	61.53%	1st	—N/a	Won

== Filmography ==
Benitez made a guest appearances in shows and events at some films and television. His well-known television show was the Game Changer which is aired at ANC every Sunday. Benitez also guested in many interviews. He also founded and owns Brightlight Productions, one of the blocktime partners of Cignal Entertainment for TV5, which temporarily houses stars and talents of ABS-CBN and GMA Network.

Program	Notes
Game Changer Philippines	First Brightlight Productions program.
Sunday Noontime Live!	Creator / Producer under Brightlight Productions
I Got You	Creator / Producer under Brightlight Productions
Sunday 'Kada	Creator / Producer under Brightlight Productions
Lunch Out Loud	Creator / Producer under Brightlight Productions
Serbisyo Pilipinas	Creator / Producer under Brightlight Productions; The new public service program in over the Philippines
Rated Korina	Creator / Producer under Brightlight Productions
Oh My Dad!	Creator / Producer under Brightlight Productions
