= Mayor of Bacolod =

Head of a city government in the Philippines

Mayor of the City of Bacolod
- Alkalde sang Dakbanwa sang Bacolod; Alkalde sa Dakbayan sa Bacolod; Alcalde de la Ciudad de Bacolod
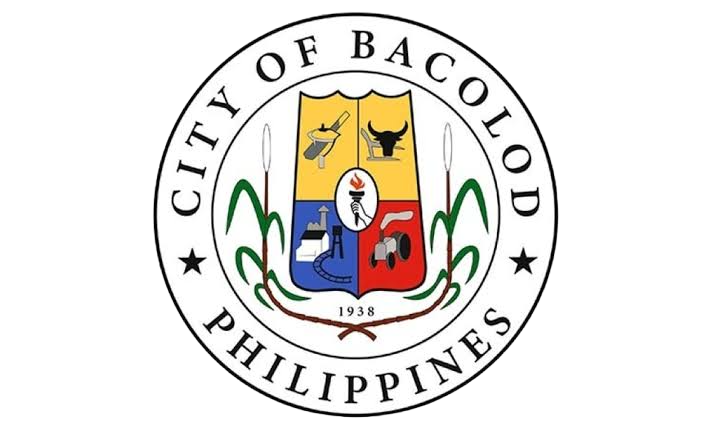
- Seal of the Bacolod City Mayor

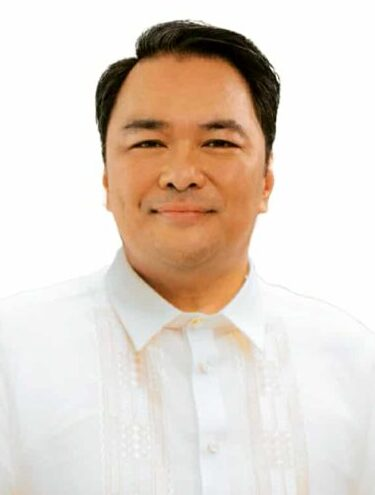
- Incumbent; Greg Gasataya since June 30, 2025
- Style: The Honorable
- Seat: Bacolod City Hall (legal); Government Center (official)
- Appointer: Elected via popular vote
- Term length: 3 years
- Inaugural holder: Bernardino de los Santoss (as Gobernadorcillo); Gregorio Gonzaga (as Presidente Municipal); Fernando M. Cuadra (as interim City Mayor); Alfredo Montelibano Sr. (as first City Mayor)
- Formation: 1775 (historic); 1890 (gobernadorcillo); 1894 (presidente municipal); 1934 (de jure, city mayorship)

The City Mayor of Bacolod (Filipino: Punong Lungsod ng Bakulod); (Hiligaynon: Alkalde sang Dakbanwa sang Bacolod) is the local chief executive and head of the City Government of Bacolod. Along with the Governors of Negros Occidental, Negros Oriental, and Siquijor, as mayor of a highly urbanized city, he sits as one of the chief executives in the Negros Island Region.

== History ==
While Bacolod was first established as a town on January 20, 1755, the capital of Negros Island in 1846 and the capital of Negros Occidental in 1890, the archives of the City Government of Bacolod lists Bernardino de los Santos as Gobernadorcillo upon the establishment of Bacolod as the capital of Negros Occidental after the division of the island, while Gregorio Gonzaga as the recorded Presidente Municipal in 1894. Bacolod, being a pueblo and municipality then, was composed of a municipal council headed by a president. The Presidente Municipal may opt to be assisted by deputies normally called Tiniente Mayor.

As the Province of Negros Occidental grew in importance due to the sugar industry, Bacolod became a hub for business and politics, drawing more immigrant families into the city. Along with nearby Silay, population swelled due to economic and work opportunities, including education and the Sugar Exchange Center located near the town plaza.

=== Cityhood ===
Through Commonwealth Act No. 326, sponsored by Representative Pedro C. Hernaez of the Second District of Negros Occidental, Bacolod was chartered as a city on June 18, 1938. Alfredo Montelíbano, Sr. became the first city mayor upon his inauguration on October 18, 1938, along with the formal inauguration of the City Government of Bacolod. On the City Plaza still stands the tindalo tree planted by President Manuel Quezon as a reminder of the inauguration ceremonies.

=== As a highly urbanized city ===
Batas Pambansa Blg. 51 elevated the status of the city further as a highly urbanized city on December 22, 1979. Due to this, the Provincial Government of Negros Occidental ceased to have control over Bacolod. It received funding directly from the national allocation, but meant that the citizens of Bacolod cannot vote for the officials of the Provincial Government nor run for elective provincial posts.

The last city official to have become won a post in the province was former Governor Alfredo Montelibano, Jr. After the promulgation of the 1987 Philippine Constitution, Bacolod City was given its own representation in Congress as the Lone District of Bacolod.

== List ==
No.	Image	Name	Term	Title (Mayor)	Deputy	Title (Deputy)
1		Bernardino delos Santos	1890–1894	Gobernadorcillo	(None)	Next lower post: Cabeza de Barangay
2		Gregorio Gonzaga	1894–1895	Presidente Municipal	Manual Fernandez	Teniente Mayor
3		Isabelo Labarro	1895–1896	Presidente Municipal	Leoncio Garrucho	Teniente Mayor
4		Fausto Gonzaga	1896–1897	Presidente Municipal	Pio Arcea	Teniente Mayor
5		Manuel Fernandez	1897–1898	Presidente Municipal	Faustino Velez	Teniente Mayor
6		Basiliso Villanueva	1898–1899	Presidente Municipal	Francisco Agravante	Secretario Municipal
7		Jose Gonzaga	1899–1903	Presidente Municipal	Timoteo Manalo	Secretario Municipal
8		Jo. V.L. Gonzaga	1903–1906	Presidente Municipal	Francisco Agravante	Secretario Municipal
9		Mario Ramos	1906–1909	Presidente Municipal	Manuel Fernandez	Vice Presidente Municipal
10		Esteban Guanzon	1909–1912	Presidente Municipal	Domiciano Gonzaga	Vice Presidente Municipal
11		Olimpio San Jose	1912–1913	Presidente Interim	V. D. Aragon	Secretario Municipal
12		Esteban Henares	1913–1916	Presidente Municipal	Olimpio San Jose	Vice Presidente Municipal
13		Crispino Ramos	1917–1919	Presidente Municipal	Timoteo Manalo	Vice Presidente Municipal
14		Olimpio de la Rama	1919–1922	Presidente Municipal	Generoso Villanueva	Vice Presidente Municipal
15		Jose Ramos	1922–1925	Presidente Municipal	Dionisio Gonzaga	Vice Presidente Municipal
16		Domingo Vallesteros	1925–1931	Presidente Municipal	Augusto R. Villarosa (first); Hilarion Gonzaga (second)	Vice Presidente Municipal
17		Felipe Arroyo	1931–1934	Presidente Municipal	Dominador Vallesteros	Vice Presidente Municipal
18		Pablo D. Makilan	1934–1937	Presidente Municipal	Cirilo Ciocon	Vice Presidente Municipal
19		Fernando M. Cuadra	1938	Alcalde Municipal (Interim City Mayor)	Jose M. Millarez	Vice Alcalde
20		Alfredo Montelibano Sr.	1938 – 1940	City Mayor	Jose M. Millarez	Vice Mayor
21		Alfredo Yulo	1940 – 1942	City Mayor	Aurelio L. Locsin	Vice Mayor
–		Augusto R. Villarosa	1942 – 1945	Acting Mayor	–	–
22		Felix Querubin	1945	City Mayor	–	Vice Mayor
23		Aurelio L. Locsin	1945	City Mayor	Juan D. Ta-ala	Vice Mayor
24		Nicolasa de la Peña	1946	City Mayor	–	Vice Mayor
25		Vicente T. Remitio	1946 – 1948	City Mayor	Mario S. Villanueva	Vice Mayor
26		Mario S. Villanueva	1948 – 1951	City Mayor	Sixto Castillo	Vice Mayor
27		Felix Amante	1951 – 1955	City Mayor	Manuel Villanueva	Vice Mayor
–		Manuel Villanueva	1954 – 1955	City Mayor (Acting)	–	Vice Mayor
–		Jose V. Coruña	1954	City Mayor (Acting)	–	Vice Mayor
28		Teofisto Cordova	1956 – 1963	City Mayor	Gloria Esteban (first)Romeo Guanzon (Second)	Vice Mayor
29		Romeo Guanzon	1964 – 1971	City Mayor	Inoncencio Lucasan (first); Jovito Sayson (Second)	Vice Mayor
30		Carlos Benares	1972 – 1976	City Mayor	Raymundo Dizon Jr.	Vice Mayor
31		Raymundo Dizon Jr.	1976 – 1980	City Mayor	Inocencio Lucasan	Vice Mayor
32		Jose Montalvo Jr.	1980 – 1986	City Mayor	Jose Las Piñas	Vice Mayor
33		Amado Parreño Jr.	1986 – 1987	OIC-City Mayor	Juan Ramon Guanzon	OIC-Vice Mayor
34		Napoleon Gonzaga	1987–1988	City Mayor	Reynalda Sayson	Vice Mayor
35		Alfredo Montelibano Jr.	February 2, 1988 – March 1995	City Mayor	Kenneth Barredo (1988–1992); Evelio Leonardia (1992–1995)	Vice Mayor
–		Alfredo Jalbuena Jr.	March 1995 – May 1995	City Mayor (Acting)	Rolando V. Villamor	Vice Mayor (Acting)
–		Rolando V. Villamor	May 1995 – June 30, 1995	City Mayor (Acting)	–	–
36		Evelio Leonardia	June 30, 1995 – June 30, 1998	City Mayor	Wilmar Drilon	Vice Mayor
37		Oscar Verdeflor	July 1, 1998 – March 13, 2001	City Mayor	Luzviminda Valdez	Vice Mayor
38		Luzviminda Valdez	March 13, 2001 – June 30, 2004	City Mayor	Ramiro Garcia Jr.	Vice Mayor
39		Evelio Leonardia	June 30, 2004 – June 30, 2013	City Mayor	Renecito Novero (2004–2007); Jude Thaddeus Sayson (2007–2013)	Vice Mayor
40		Monico Puentevella	June 30, 2013 – June 30, 2016	City Mayor	Greg Gasataya	Vice Mayor
–		Greg Gasataya	November 2015 – February 2016	City Mayor (Acting)	El Cid Familiaran	Vice Mayor (Acting)
41		Evelio Leonardia	June 30, 2016 – June 30, 2022	City Mayor	El Cid Familiaran	Vice Mayor
42		Alfredo Benitez	June 30, 2022 – June 30, 2025	City Mayor	El Cid Familiaran	Vice Mayor
43		Greg Gasataya	June 30, 2025	City Mayor	Kalaw Puentevella	Vice Mayor
