= Bacolod's at-large congressional district =

House of Representatives of the Philippines legislative district

- Constituency for the House of Representatives of the Philippines
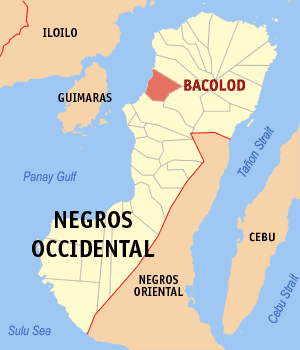
- Location of Bacolod within Negros Occidental
- City: Bacolod
- Region: Negros Island Region
- Population: 600,783 (2020)
- Electorate: 312,816 (2019)
- Area: 162.67 km^{2} (62.81 sq mi)

Current constituency
- Created: 1943
- Representative: Albee Benitez
- Political party: PFP
- Congressional bloc: Majority

The Bacolod's at-large congressional district is the city-wide electoral district in Bacolod, Philippines. It has been electing representatives at-large to the House of Representatives since 1987 and earlier to the National Assembly from 1943 to 1944.

The district was first formed ahead of the 1943 Philippine legislative election following the ratification of the Second Philippine Republic constitution which called for a unicameral legislature composed of delegates from all provinces and chartered cities in the country. Bacolod, a chartered city since 1938, elected Francisco Zulueta to the National Assembly, who was joined by then-mayor Alfredo C. Yulo as an appointed second delegate. The district became inactive following the restoration of the House of Representatives in 1945 when the city reverted to its old provincial constituency of Negros Occidental's 2nd congressional district. In the unicameral Batasang Pambansa that replaced the House, Bacolod was not entitled to its own separate representation despite being a highly-urbanized city. Instead, it formed part of the multi-member Region VI's at-large district for the interim parliament from 1978 to 1984 and Negros Occidental's at-large district in the regular parliament from 1984 to 1986. The city-wide electoral district was only restored in 1987 under a new constitution.

The district is currently represented in the 20th Congress is Albee Benitez of the Partido Federal ng Pilipinas (PFP).

== Representation history ==
#	Term of office		National Assembly	Seat A				Seat B			
#	Start	End	National Assembly	Image	Member	Party	Electoral history	Image	Member	Party	Electoral history
=== Bacolod's at-large district for the National Assembly (Second Philippine Republic) ===
District created September 7, 1943.
–	September 25, 1943	February 2, 1944	1st		Francisco Zulueta	KALIBAPI	Elected in 1943.		Alfredo C. Yulo	KALIBAPI	Appointed as an ex officio member.
District dissolved into Negros Occidental's 2nd district.
#	Term of office		Congress	Single seat				Seats eliminated			
#	Start	End	Congress	Image	Member	Party	Electoral history	Seats eliminated			
=== Bacolod's at-large district for the House of Representatives of the Philippines ===								Seats eliminated			
District re-created February 2, 1987. Redistricted from Negros Occidental's at-large district.								Seats eliminated			
1	June 30, 1987	June 30, 1998	8th		Romeo G. Guanzon	Lakas ng Bansa	Elected in 1987.	Seats eliminated			
1	June 30, 1987	June 30, 1998	9th		Romeo G. Guanzon	LDP	Re-elected in 1992.	Seats eliminated			
1	June 30, 1987	June 30, 1998	10th		Romeo G. Guanzon	Lakas	Re-elected in 1995.	Seats eliminated			
2	June 30, 1998	June 30, 2001	11th		Juan N. Orola Jr.	LAMMP	Elected in 1998.	Seats eliminated			
3	June 30, 2001	June 30, 2010	12th		Monico Puentevella	Lakas	Elected in 2001.	Seats eliminated			
3	June 30, 2001	June 30, 2010	13th		Monico Puentevella	Lakas	Re-elected in 2004.	Seats eliminated			
3	June 30, 2001	June 30, 2010	14th		Monico Puentevella	Lakas	Re-elected in 2007.	Seats eliminated			
4	June 30, 2010	June 30, 2013	15th		Anthony Golez	Independent	Elected in 2010.	Seats eliminated			
5	June 30, 2013	June 30, 2016	16th		Evelio Leonardia	NPC	Elected in 2013.	Seats eliminated			
6	June 30, 2016	June 30, 2025	17th		Greg Gasataya	NPC (Asenso Bacolod)	Elected in 2016.	Seats eliminated			
6	June 30, 2016	June 30, 2025	18th		Greg Gasataya	NPC (Asenso Bacolod)	Re-elected in 2019.	Seats eliminated			
6	June 30, 2016	June 30, 2025	19th		Greg Gasataya	NPC (Asenso Bacolod)	Re-elected in 2022.	Seats eliminated			
7	June 30, 2025	present	20th		Albee Benitez	Independent (Asenso Bacolod)	Elected in 2025.	Seats eliminated			
7	June 30, 2025	present	20th		Albee Benitez	PFP (Asenso Bacolod)	Elected in 2025.	Seats eliminated			

== Election results ==
=== 2025 ===
2025 Philippine House of Representatives elections
Party	Candidate	Votes	%
Independent	Albee Benitez	164,145	46.12
Nacionalista	Bing Leonardia	119,431	33.56
Independent	Ed Gulmatico	1,671	0.47
Independent	Roger Abanid	1,513	0.43
Independent	Romy Gustilo	1,394	0.39
Total votes		288,154	100.00
Independent hold			

=== 2022 ===
2022 Philippine House of Representatives elections
Party	Candidate	Votes	%
NPC	Greg Gasataya (incumbent)	185,470	69.27
Independent	Dan Atayde	80,591	30.1
PDDS	Nonong San Miguel	850	0.32
Independent	Romy Gustilo	850	0.32
Total votes		267,761	100.00
NPC hold			

=== 2019 ===
2019 Philippine House of Representatives elections
Party	Candidate	Votes	%
NPC	Greg Gasataya (incumbent)	135,346	
Lakas	Monico Puentevella	84,705	
Independent	Kevin Moises	3,751	
Total votes			
NPC hold			

== See also ==
- Legislative districts of Bacolod
