= List of members of the House of Representatives of the Philippines (M) =

This is a complete list of past and present members of the House of Representatives of the Philippines whose last names begin with the letter M.

This list also includes members of the Philippine Assembly (1907–1916), the Commonwealth National Assembly (1935–1941), the Second Republic National Assembly (1943–1944) and the Batasang Pambansa (1978–1986).

== Ma ==
- Regalado Maambong, member for Cebu (1984–1986)
- Rufino Macagba, member for La Union (1943–1944)
- Artemio Macalino, member for Pampanga's 2nd district (1949–1953)
- Angel Macapagal, member for Pampanga's 2nd district (1965–1969)
- Diosdado Macapagal, member for Pampanga's 1st district (1949–1957)
- Benasing Macarambon Jr., member for Lanao del Sur's 2nd district (1998–2007)
- Rolando Macasaet, member for SSS-GSIS Pensyonado party-list (2025–present)
- Edward Maceda, member for Manila's 4th district (2016–2025)
- Giselle Lazaro-Maceda, member for Manila's 4th district (2025–present)
- Emilio Macias, member for Negros Oriental (1984–1986), and Negros Oriental's 2nd district (1998–2007)
- Lamberto Macias, member for Negros Oriental's 2nd district (1953–1972)
- Lilia Macrohon-Nuño, member for Zamboanga City's 2nd district (2010–2013)
- Silvestra Macutay, member for Isabela (1931–1934)
- Jaenito Madamba, member for Region VI (1978–1984)
- Sunny Rose Madamba, member for APEC party-list (2001–2007)
- Domingo Maddela, member for Nueva Vizcaya (1931–1934)
- Eleandro Jesus Madrona, member for Romblon (1992–2001, 2007–2016, 2019–present)
- Emmanuel Madrona, member for Romblon (2016–2019)
- Esteban Madrona, member for Romblon (1969–1972)
- Silvino Maestrado, member for Misamis (1928–1931)
- Enrique Magalona, member for Negros Occidental's 1st district (1931–1941, 1945–1946)
- Constancio Maglana, member for Davao Oriental (1968–1972)
- Joel Maglunsod, member for Anakpawis party-list (2009–2010)
- Melecio Magno, Cabinet member (1978–1984)
- Pedro Magsalin, member for Rizal's 1st district (1931–1938)
- Eugelio Magsaysay, member for AVE party-list (2004–2007, 2010–2016)
- Genaro Magsaysay, member for Zambales (1957–1959)
- Milagros Magsaysay, member for Senior Citizens party-list (2017–2019), and United Senior Citizens party-list (2022–present)
- Mitos Magsaysay, member for Zambales's 1st district (2004–2013)
- Ramon Magsaysay, member for Zambales (1946–1950)
- Ramon Magsaysay Jr., member for Zambales (1965–1969)
- Vicente Magsaysay, member for Region III (1978–1984)
- Marissa Magsino, member for OFW party-list (2022–present)
- Renato Magtubo, member for Sanlakas party-list (1998–2001, 2003–2004), and Partido ng Manggagawa party-list (2004–2007)
- Querube Makalintal, member for Region IV (1978–1984)
- Corazon Nuñez Malanyaon, member for Davao Oriental's 1st district (2001–2007, 2016–2022)
- Along Malapitan, member for Caloocan's 1st district (2016–2022)
- Oscar Malapitan, member for Caloocan's 1st district (2004–2013, 2022–present)
- Pablo Malasarte, member for Bohol's 2nd district (1969–1972)
- Ayong Maliksi, member for Cavite's 2nd district (1998–2001), and Cavite's 3rd district (2010–2013)
- Maximo Malvar, member for Batangas (1943–1944)
- Potenciano Malvar, member for Laguna's 1st district (1909–1910)
- Nurodin Mamaluba, sectoral member (1978–1984)
- Francisco Mamba, member for Cagayan's 3rd district (1992–1995)
- Manuel Mamba, member for Cagayan's 3rd district (1995–1998, 2001–2010)
- Jesulito Manalo, member for Angkla party-list (2013–2019)
- Vicente Manapat, member for Pampanga's 2nd district (1922–1925)
- Hermilando Mandanas, member for Batangas's 2nd district (2004–2013)
- Cecilio Maneja, member for Marinduque (1943–1944, 1945–1946)
- Allen Jesse Mangaoang, member for Kalinga (2016–present)
- Luminog Mangelen, member for Cotabato (1953–1957)
- Baldomero Mangiliman, member for Region III (1978–1984)
- Valentin Manglapus, member for Mountain Province (1917–1919)
- Abdullah Sarip Mangotara, member for Lanao del Norte's 2nd district (1995–2001)
- Esmael Mangudadatu, member for Maguindanao's 2nd district (2019–2022), and Maguindanao del Sur (2025–present)
- Pax Mangudadatu, member for Sultan Kudarat (2007–2010)
- Suharto Mangudadatu, member for Sultan Kudarat (2004–2007), and Sultan Kudarat's 1st district (2016–2019)
- Zajid Mangudadatu, member for Maguindanao's 2nd district (2013–2019)
- Panfilo Manguera, member for Marinduque (1949–1957)
- Braulio Manikan, member for Capiz's 3rd district (1909–1912)
- Norberto Manikis, member for Bulacan's 2nd district (1922–1925)
- Bing Maniquiz, member for Zambales's 2nd district (2022–present)
- Juan Manuel, Cabinet member (1978–1984)
- Raoul Manuel, member for Kabataan party-list (2022–2025)
- Cirilo Mapa Jr., member for Iloilo's 5th district (1912–1916), and Iloilo (1943–1944)
- Dionisio Mapa, member for Negros Occidental's 2nd district (1907–1909)
- Serafin Marabut, member for Samar's 2nd district (1928–1936), and Samar (1943–1944)
- Daniel Maramba, member for Pangasinan's 3rd district (1934–1941)
- Zenaida Maranan-de Castro, member for 1-UTAK party-list (2012–2013)
- Alfredo Marañon, member for Negros Occidental (1984–1986), and Negros Occidental's 2nd district (1995–2004)
- Alfredo Marañon III, member for Negros Occidental's 2nd district (2004–2013, 2022–present)
- Apolonio Marasigan, member for Batangas's 2nd district (1961–1965)
- Mariano Marbella, member for Albay's 3rd district (1919–1922)
- Eduardo Marcadia, member for Masbate (1925–1928)
- Pedro Marcellana Jr., member for Albay (1984–1986)
- Abdon Marchadesch, member for Leyte's 3rd district (1909–1912)
- Rolando Marcial, member for Davao del Norte (1984–1986)
- Paolo Marcoleta, member for SAGIP party-list (2025–present)
- Rodante Marcoleta, member for Alagad party-list (2004–2013), and SAGIP party-list (2016–2025)
- Bongbong Marcos, member for Ilocos Norte's 2nd district (1992–1995, 2007–2010)
- Ferdinand Marcos, member for Ilocos Norte's 2nd district (1949–1959)
- Imee Marcos, member for Ilocos Norte (1984–1986), and Ilocos Norte's 2nd district (1998–2007)
- Imelda Marcos, member for Region IV (1978–1984), Leyte's 2nd district (1995–1998), and Ilocos Norte's 2nd district (2010–2019)
- Mariano Marcos, member for Ilocos Norte's 2nd district (1925–1931)
- Sandro Marcos, member for Ilocos Norte's 1st district (2022–present)
- Rafael V. Mariano, member for Anakpawis party-list (2004–2007, 2008–2013)
- Marvey Mariño, member for Batangas's 5th district (2016–present)
- Salvador Mariño, member for Manila's 1st district (1957–1961)
- Bienvenido Marquez Jr., member for Quezon (1984–1986), and Quezon's 3rd district (1987–1992)
- Carlito Marquez, member for Aklan (2016–2019), and Aklan's 1st district (2019–2025)
- Jess Marquez, member for Aklan's 1st district (2025–present)
- Gregorio Marrero, member for Mountain Province (1945–1946)
- Antonio Martinez, member for Caloocan (1984–1986)
- Celestino Martinez Jr., member for Cebu's 4th district (1987–1995)
- Celestino Martinez III, member for Cebu's 4th district (2010)
- Clavel Martinez, member for Cebu's 4th district (1998–2007)
- Eric Martinez, member for Valenzuela's 2nd district (2016–present)
- Fermin Martinez, member for Negros Oriental's 2nd district (1922–1925)
- Jose Martinez, member for Leyte's 1st district (1946–1949)
- Cosme Marzan, member for Cagayan's 2nd district (1934–1935)
- Roberto Mascarina, member for Ating Koop party-list (2016)
- Crescencio Masigan, member for Cagayan's 1st district (1912–1916)
- Cornelio Maskariño, member for Davao City's 2nd district (1987–1992)
- Edgardo Masongsong, member for 1-CARE party-list (2013–2016)
- Dimple Mastura, member for Maguindanao's 1st district (2022), and Maguindanao del Norte (2022–present)
- Michael Mastura, member for Maguindanao's 1st district (1987–1995)
- Guimid Matalam, member for Maguindanao's 2nd district (1987–1992, 2001–2004)
- Rashidin Matba, member for Tawi-Tawi (2019–2022)
- Artemio Mate, member for Leyte's 1st district (1965–1972), Region VIII (1978–1984), and Leyte (1984–1986)
- Ismael Mathay III, member for Quezon City's 2nd district (2001–2004)
- Mel Mathay, member for Quezon City (1984–1986), and Quezon City's 4th district (1987–1992)
- Ann Matibag, member for Laguna's 1st district (2022–present)
- Edward Matti, member for Negros Occidental's 4th district (1987–1998)
- Francisco Matugas, member for Surigao del Norte's 1st district (2007–2016, 2025–present)
- Francisco Jose Matugas II, member for Surigao del Norte's 1st district (2016–2025)
- Emilio Mayo, member for Batangas's 3rd district (1934–1935)
- Liza Maza, member for Bayan Muna party-list (2001–2004), and Gabriela party-list (2004–2010)
- Ramon Maza, member for Antique (1916–1922)

== Me ==
- Pedro Medalla, member for Occidental Mindoro (1965–1972)
- Emilio Medina, member for Ilocos Norte's 2nd district (1931–1934)
- Enrique Medina Jr., member for Negros Oriental's 2nd district (1946–1953), and Region VII (1978–1984)
- Guadencio Medina, member for Nueva Ecija (1919–1922)
- Antonio Mejia. member for Pangasinan's 3rd district (1931–1934)
- Jose Melencio, member for Mindanao and Sulu (1925–1931)
- Mariano Melendres, member for Rizal's 2nd district (1919–1925)
- Emiliano Melgazo, member for Region VIII (1978–1984), and Leyte (1984–1986)
- Ignacio Meliton, member for Camarines Sur's 1st district (1934–1935)
- Evelyn Mellana, member for Agusan del Sur's 2nd district (2010–2019)
- Jose Mencio, member for Mountain Province's 2nd district (1946–1949)
- Makmod Mending Jr., member for Amin party-list (2016–2019)
- Mario Gene Mendiola, member for Occidental Mindoro (1987–1992)
- Pedro Mendiola, member for Samar's 1st district (1916–1922)
- Pedro Mendiola Sr., member for Region IV-A (1978–1984), and Occidental Mindoro (1984–1986)
- Alejandro Mendoza, member for Pangasinan's 4th district (1919–1922)
- Alfonso Mendoza, member for Manila's 2nd district (1922–1928, 1934–1935, 1945–1946), and Manila (1943–1944)
- Chris Mendoza, member for Pangasinan's 2nd district (1992–1995)
- Edgar Mendoza, member for Batangas's 2nd district (1998–2001)
- Estelito Mendoza, member for Region III (1978–1980), and Cabinet member (1984–1986)
- Joselito Mendoza, member for Bulacan's 3rd district (2010–2016)
- Mark Llandro Mendoza, member for Batangas's 4th district (2007–2016)
- Raymond Mendoza, member for TUCP party-list (2009–2013, 2013–2016, 2016–present)
- Vigor Maria Mendoza II, member for 1-UTAK party-list (2009–2010)
- Marissa Mercado-Andaya, member for Camarines Sur's 1st district (2019–2020)
- Damian Mercado, member for Southern Leyte (2013–2016)
- Homer Mercado, member for 1-UTAK party-list (2011–2012)
- Lani Mercado, member for Cavite's 2nd district (2010–2016, 2022–present)
- Luz Mercado, member for Southern Leyte's 1st district (2022–2025)
- Monico Mercado, member for Pampanga's 1st district (1907–1912), and Mindanao and Sulu (1928–1931)
- Orly Mercado, member for Quezon City (1984–1986)
- Rogaciano Mercado, member for Bulacan's 2nd district (1953–1972), Bulacan (1984–1986), and Bulacan's 4th district (1987–1989)
- Roger Mercado, member for Southern Leyte (1987–1998, 2004–2013, 2016–2021), and Southern Leyte's 1st district (2025–present)

== Mi ==
- Peter Miguel, member for South Cotabato's 2nd district (2022–present)
- Fabian Millar, member for Tayabas's 1st district (1919–1922, 1928–1934)
- Juan Millan, member for Pangasinan's 5th district (1928–1934)
- Luciano Millan, member for Pangasinan's 5th district (1957–1965)
- Vicente Millora, member for Region I (1978–1984)
- Maximino Mina, member for Ilocos Sur's 2nd district (1907–1909)
- Amer Mindalano, member for Lanao (1946–1949)
- Florencio Miraflores, member for Aklan (2004–2013), and Aklan's 2nd district (2025–present)
- Benedicto Miran, member for Aurora (1987–1995)
- Anthony Miranda, member for Isabela's 4th district (2004–2007)
- Juan Miranda, member for Camarines Sur's 1st district (1946–1949)
- Alejandro Mirasol, member for Negros Occidental's 5th district (2012–2019)
- Abraham Mitra, member for Palawan's 2nd district (2001–2010)
- Ramon P. Mitra, member for Mountain Province's 2nd district (1938–1941, 1945–1946, 1953–1965)
- Ramon Mitra Jr., member for Palawan (1965–1971, 1984–1986, 1987–1992)

== Mo ==
- Simeon Mobo, member for Capiz's 3rd district (1907–1909)
- Saturnino Moldero, member for Mountain Province (1925–1931), and Mountain Province's 1st district (1935–1941)
- Jacinto Molina, member for Bulacan (1943–1944)
- Tomas Molina, member for Rizal (1943–1944)
- Dennis Molintas, member for Mountain Province's 2nd district (1949–1953)
- Sebastian Caruso Moll Jr., member for Camarines Sur's 2nd district (1946–1949)
- Romeo Momo, member for CWS party-list (2019–2022), and Surigao del Sur's 1st district (2022–present)
- Narciso Monfort, member for Region VI (1978–1984), Iloilo (1984–1986), and Iloilo's 4th district (1987–1992, 1995–2004)
- Jose Montalvo, member for Region VI (1978–1984)
- Justiniano Montano, member for Cavite (1935–1938, 1945–1949, 1957–1972)
- Cirilo Roy Montejo, member for Leyte's 1st district (1987–1995)
- Filomeno Montejo, member for Leyte's 4th district (1922–1928, 1945–1946)
- Neil Benedict Montejo, member for An Waray party-list (2009–2016)
- Remo Montelibano, member for Region VI (1978–1984)
- Roberto Montelibano, member for Negros Occidental's 2nd district (1969–1972), and Negros Occidental (1984–1986)
- Jeremias Montemayor, member for Region I (1978–1984)
- Leonardo Montemayor, sectoral member (1992–1998), member for ABA party-list (1998–2001), and ABA-AKO party-list (2009–2010)
- Antonio Montenegro, member for Manila's 1st district (1916–1919)
- Iris Marie Montes, member for 4K party-list (2025–present)
- Agustin Montilla, member for Negros Occidental's 3rd district (1907–1909)
- Angelo Montilla, member for Sultan Kudarat (1995–2004)
- Emilio Montilla, member for Negros Occidental's 3rd district (1928–1931)
- Gil Montilla, member for Negros Occidental's 3rd district (1912–1919, 1935–1938), and Negros Occidental (1943–1944)
- Ruperto Montinola, member for Iloilo's 2nd district (1935–1940)
- Teodoro Montoro, member for AASENSO party-list (2016–2019)
- Eusebio Moore, member for Northern Samar (1967–1969)
- Luis Morales, member for Tarlac's 1st district (1912–1922)
- Ponciano Morales, member for Ilocos Sur's 2nd district (1916–1922)
- Tomas Morato, member for Tayabas (1943–1944), and Tayabas's 2nd district (1946–1949)
- Michael Morden, member for API party-list (2022–present)
- Florencio Moreno, member for Romblon (1949–1957)
- Jose Moreno, member for Romblon (1957–1969)
- Oscar Moreno, member for Misamis Oriental's 1st district (1998–2004)
- Conrado Morente, member for Oriental Mindoro (1953–1957)
- Jose Reynaldo Morente, member for Oriental Mindoro (1984–1986)
- Gerardo Morrero, member for Samar's 3rd district (1925–1928, 1931–1935)
- Segundo Moscoso, member for Antique (1925–1934)

== Mu ==
- Candu Muarip, member for Basilan (1984–1986, 1995–1998)
- Pedro Muñoz, member for Batangas's 2nd district (1946–1949)
- Cecilia Muñoz-Palma, member for Quezon City (1984–1986)
- Gregorio Murillo, member for Surigao del Sur (1965–1969)
- Nasser Mustafa, sectoral member (1984–1986)
