= Marcoleta (surname) =

Marcoleta is a Spanish surname. Notable people with the surname include:

- Luis Marcoleta (born 1959), Chilean former footballer
- Paolo Marcoleta (born 1976), Filipino politician
- Rodante Marcoleta (born 1953), Filipino politician
  - Edna Marcoleta, his wife
