= China Jocson =

Filipina former journalist and government official

China Jocson Cojuangco

Assistant to the Presidential Spokesperson
- In office June 30, 2016 – c. 2018
- President: Rodrigo Duterte
- Presidential Spokesperson: Ernesto Abella; Harry Roque
- Preceded by: Abigail Valte

Personal details
- Citizenship: Filipino
- Party: NPC (2021–present)
- Spouse: Charlie Cojuangco (m. 2021; died 2022)
- Children: 1
- Education: University of Pennsylvania (attended)

China Jocson-Cojuangco was a Filipina crisis management strategist and former journalist who served as the Assistant to the Presidential Spokesperson (Deputy to the Presidential Spokesperson) in the administration of President Rodrigo Duterte.

She was a news presenter for GMA News and Public Affairs (2003–2006) and later on, spearheaded the lifestyle content of GMA Online (2010–2015).

Cojuangco is currently involved in pursuing her late husband's philanthropic legacy, through the Little Blue Chair initiative.

== Family and background ==
She is the granddaughter of Atty. Tomas P. Matic who was Government Corporate Counsel during President Diosdado Macapagal's administration. She is also kin to former Bureau of Internal Revenue Director, Umiral P. Matic, who was controversially kidnapped and killed while serving then Vice President Joseph Estrada.

She is the sole successor to her maternal grandmother Doña Marcela Jocson of Pampanga and the daughter of Robert Capili y Pacion Rodriguez (deceased), a trustee at Zuellig Pharma Corporation.

She and Tarlac 1st District representative Charlie Cojuangco were married on April 7, 2021. She has a daughter from a previous relationship.
