= Negros Occidental's 2nd congressional district =

Legislative district of the Philippines

- Constituency for the House of Representatives of the Philippines
- Boundary of Negros Occidental's 2nd congressional district in Negros Occidental
- Location of Negros Occidental within the Philippines
- Province: Negros Occidental
- Region: Negros Island Region
- Population: 362,521 (2020)
- Electorate: 214,284 (2022)
- Major settlements: 3 LGUs: Cities; Cadiz; Sagay; Municipalities; Manapla
- Area: 967.77 km^{2} (373.66 sq mi)

Current constituency
- Created: 1907
- Representative: Alfredo Marañon III
- Political party: NUP; UNEGA
- Congressional bloc: Majority

Negros Occidental's 2nd congressional district is one of the six congressional districts of the Philippines in the province of Negros Occidental. It has been represented in the House of Representatives of the Philippines since 1916 and earlier in the Philippine Assembly from 1907 to 1916. The district consists of the northern Negros Occidental cities of Cadiz and Sagay, as well as the adjacent municipality of Manapla. It is currently represented in the 20th Congress by Alfredo Marañon III of the National Unity Party (NUP) and United Negros Alliance (UNEGA).

Prior to its second dissolution in 1972, the district consisted of the city of Bacolod and the northwestern municipalities of Bago, La Carlota, Murcia, Pulupandan, San Enrique, Talisay, and Valladolid.

== Representation history ==
#	Image	Member	Term of office		Legislature	Party	Electoral history	Constituent LGUs
#	Image	Member	Start	End	Legislature	Party	Electoral history	Constituent LGUs
=== Negros Occidental's 2nd district for the Philippine Assembly ===
District created January 9, 1907.
1		Dionisio Mapa	October 16, 1907	March 13, 1909	1st	Nacionalista	Elected in 1907.	1907–1916; Bacolod, Bago, La Carlota, Murcia, Talisay, Valladolid
2		Manuel Fernández Yanson	October 16, 1909	October 16, 1912	2nd	Progresista	Elected in 1909.	1907–1916; Bacolod, Bago, La Carlota, Murcia, Talisay, Valladolid
3		Rafael Alunan Sr.	October 16, 1912	October 16, 1916	3rd	Nacionalista	Elected in 1912.	1907–1916; Bacolod, Bago, La Carlota, Murcia, Talisay, Valladolid
=== Negros Occidental's 2nd district for the House of Representatives of the Philippine Islands ===
(3)		Rafael Alunan Sr.	October 16, 1916	June 6, 1922	4th	Nacionalista	Re-elected in 1916.	1916–1919; Bacolod, Bago, La Carlota, Murcia, Pulupandan, Talisay, Valladolid
(3)		Rafael Alunan Sr.	October 16, 1916	June 6, 1922	5th	Nacionalista	Re-elected in 1919.	1919–1935; Bacolod, Bago, La Carlota, Murcia, Pulupandan, San Enrique, Talisay, Valladolid
4		Vicente Jiménez Yanson	June 6, 1922	June 2, 1925	6th	Nacionalista; Colectivista	Elected in 1922.	1919–1935; Bacolod, Bago, La Carlota, Murcia, Pulupandan, San Enrique, Talisay, Valladolid
5		Ramón Torres	June 2, 1925	June 5, 1928	7th	Nacionalista; Consolidado	Elected in 1925.	1919–1935; Bacolod, Bago, La Carlota, Murcia, Pulupandan, San Enrique, Talisay, Valladolid
(4)		Vicente Jiménez Yanson	June 5, 1928	June 2, 1931	8th	Nacionalista; Consolidado	Elected in 1928.	1919–1935; Bacolod, Bago, La Carlota, Murcia, Pulupandan, San Enrique, Talisay, Valladolid
(5)		Ramón Torres	June 2, 1931	September 16, 1935	9th	Nacionalista; Consolidado	Elected in 1931.	1919–1935; Bacolod, Bago, La Carlota, Murcia, Pulupandan, San Enrique, Talisay, Valladolid
(5)		Ramón Torres	June 2, 1931	September 16, 1935	10th	Nacionalista; Democrático	Re-elected in 1934.	1919–1935; Bacolod, Bago, La Carlota, Murcia, Pulupandan, San Enrique, Talisay, Valladolid
#	Image	Member	Term of office		National Assembly	Party	Electoral history	Constituent LGUs
#	Image	Member	Start	End	National Assembly	Party	Electoral history	Constituent LGUs
=== Negros Occidental's 2nd district for the National Assembly (Commonwealth of the Philippines) ===
6		Pedro C. Hernáez	September 16, 1935	December 30, 1941	1st	Nacionalista; Democrático	Elected in 1935.	1935–1941; Bacolod, Bago, La Carlota, Murcia, Pulupandan, San Enrique, Talisay, Valladolid
6		Pedro C. Hernáez	September 16, 1935	December 30, 1941	2nd	Nacionalista	Re-elected in 1938.	1935–1941; Bacolod, Bago, La Carlota, Murcia, Pulupandan, San Enrique, Talisay, Valladolid
District dissolved into the two-seat Negros Occidental's at-large district and the two-seat Bacolod's at-large district for the National Assembly (Second Philippine Republic).
#	Image	Member	Term of office		Common wealth Congress	Party	Electoral history	Constituent LGUs
#	Image	Member	Start	End	Common wealth Congress	Party	Electoral history	Constituent LGUs
=== Negros Occidental's 2nd district for the House of Representatives of the Commonwealth of the Philippines ===
District re-created May 24, 1945.
7		Aguedo Gonzaga	June 11, 1945	May 25, 1946	1st	Nacionalista	Elected in 1941.	1945–1946; Bacolod, Bago, La Carlota, Murcia, Pulupandan, San Enrique, Talisay, Valladolid
#	Image	Member	Term of office		Congress	Party	Electoral history	Constituent LGUs
#	Image	Member	Start	End	Congress	Party	Electoral history	Constituent LGUs
=== Negros Occidental's 2nd district for the House of Representatives of the Philippines ===
8		Carlos A. Hilado	May 25, 1946	December 30, 1957	1st	Liberal	Elected in 1946.	1946–1972; Bacolod, Bago, La Carlota, Murcia, Pulupandan, San Enrique, Talisay, Valladolid
8		Carlos A. Hilado	May 25, 1946	December 30, 1957	2nd	Liberal	Re-elected in 1949.	1946–1972; Bacolod, Bago, La Carlota, Murcia, Pulupandan, San Enrique, Talisay, Valladolid
8		Carlos A. Hilado	May 25, 1946	December 30, 1957	3rd	Democratic	Re-elected in 1953.	1946–1972; Bacolod, Bago, La Carlota, Murcia, Pulupandan, San Enrique, Talisay, Valladolid
9		Inocencio V. Ferrer	December 30, 1957	December 30, 1965	4th	Nacionalista	Elected in 1957.	1946–1972; Bacolod, Bago, La Carlota, Murcia, Pulupandan, San Enrique, Talisay, Valladolid
9		Inocencio V. Ferrer	December 30, 1957	December 30, 1965	5th	Nacionalista	Re-elected in 1961.	1946–1972; Bacolod, Bago, La Carlota, Murcia, Pulupandan, San Enrique, Talisay, Valladolid
10		Félix P. Amante	December 30, 1965	December 30, 1969	6th	Liberal	Elected in 1965.	1946–1972; Bacolod, Bago, La Carlota, Murcia, Pulupandan, San Enrique, Talisay, Valladolid
11		Roberto L. Montelíbano	December 30, 1969	September 23, 1972	7th	Nacionalista	Elected in 1969. Removed from office after imposition of martial law.	1946–1972; Bacolod, Bago, La Carlota, Murcia, Pulupandan, San Enrique, Talisay, Valladolid
District dissolved into the sixteen-seat Region VI's at-large district for the Interim Batasang Pambansa, followed by the seven-seat Negros Occidental's at-large district for the Regular Batasang Pambansa.
District re-created February 2, 1987.
12		Manuel H. Puey	June 30, 1987	June 30, 1995	8th	Liberal	Elected in 1987.	1987–present Cadiz, Manapla, Sagay
12		Manuel H. Puey	June 30, 1987	June 30, 1995	9th	Liberal	Re-elected in 1992.	1987–present Cadiz, Manapla, Sagay
13		Alfredo Marañon	June 30, 1995	June 30, 2004	10th	Lakas	Elected in 1995.	1987–present Cadiz, Manapla, Sagay
13		Alfredo Marañon	June 30, 1995	June 30, 2004	11th	Lakas	Re-elected in 1998.	1987–present Cadiz, Manapla, Sagay
13		Alfredo Marañon	June 30, 1995	June 30, 2004	12th	UNEGA	Re-elected in 2001.	1987–present Cadiz, Manapla, Sagay
14		Alfredo D. Marañon III	June 30, 2004	June 30, 2013	13th	KAMPI (UNEGA)	Elected in 2004.	1987–present Cadiz, Manapla, Sagay
14		Alfredo D. Marañon III	June 30, 2004	June 30, 2013	14th	Lakas (UNEGA)	Re-elected in 2007.	1987–present Cadiz, Manapla, Sagay
14		Alfredo D. Marañon III	June 30, 2004	June 30, 2013	15th	NUP (UNEGA)	Re-elected in 2010.	1987–present Cadiz, Manapla, Sagay
15		Leo Rafael M. Cueva	June 30, 2013	June 30, 2022	16th	NUP (UNEGA)	Elected in 2013.	1987–present Cadiz, Manapla, Sagay
15		Leo Rafael M. Cueva	June 30, 2013	June 30, 2022	17th	NUP (UNEGA)	Re-elected in 2016.	1987–present Cadiz, Manapla, Sagay
15		Leo Rafael M. Cueva	June 30, 2013	June 30, 2022	18th	NUP (UNEGA)	Re-elected in 2019.	1987–present Cadiz, Manapla, Sagay
(14)		Alfredo D. Marañon III	June 30, 2022	Incumbent	19th	NUP (UNEGA)	Elected in 2022.	1987–present Cadiz, Manapla, Sagay
(14)		Alfredo D. Marañon III	June 30, 2022	Incumbent	20th	NUP (UNEGA)	Re-elected in 2025.	1987–present Cadiz, Manapla, Sagay

== Election results ==
=== 2025 ===
Candidate	Party	Votes	%
Alfredo Marañon III	National Unity Party	121,482	100.00
Total		121,482	100.00
Registered voters/turnout		212,207	–
National Unity Party hold			
Source: Commission on Elections

=== 2022 ===
2022 Philippine House of Representatives elections
Party	Candidate	Votes	%
NUP	Alfredo Marañon III	113,988	100.00%
Total votes		113,988	100.00%
NUP hold			

=== 2019 ===
2019 Philippine House of Representatives elections
Party	Candidate	Votes	%
NUP	Leo Rafael Cueva	87,581	100.00%
Total votes		87,581	100.00%
NUP hold			

=== 2016 ===
2016 Philippine House of Representatives elections
Party	Candidate	Votes	%
NUP	Leo Rafael Cueva	78,611	100.00%
Invalid or blank votes		70,824	
Total votes		149,435	100.00%
NUP hold			

=== 2013 ===
2013 Philippine House of Representatives elections
Party	Candidate	Votes	%
NUP	Leo Rafael Cueva	55,836	58.90
NPC	Otilia Galilea	11,685	12.33
Margin of victory		44,151	46.57%
Invalid or blank votes		26,282	27.72
Total votes		94,803	100.00
NUP hold			

=== 2010 ===
2010 Philippine House of Representatives elections
Party	Candidate	Votes	%
Lakas–Kampi	Alfredo Marañon III	86,397	83.29
ATUN	Oscar D. Arias	17,337	16.71
Valid ballots		103,784	77.93
Invalid or blank votes		29,370	22.07
Total votes		133,104	100.00
Lakas–Kampi hold			

== See also ==
- Legislative districts of Negros Occidental
