= Pontevedra, Negros Occidental =

Municipality in Negros Occidental, Philippines

Pontevedra Marayo
- Municipality
- Municipality of Pontevedra
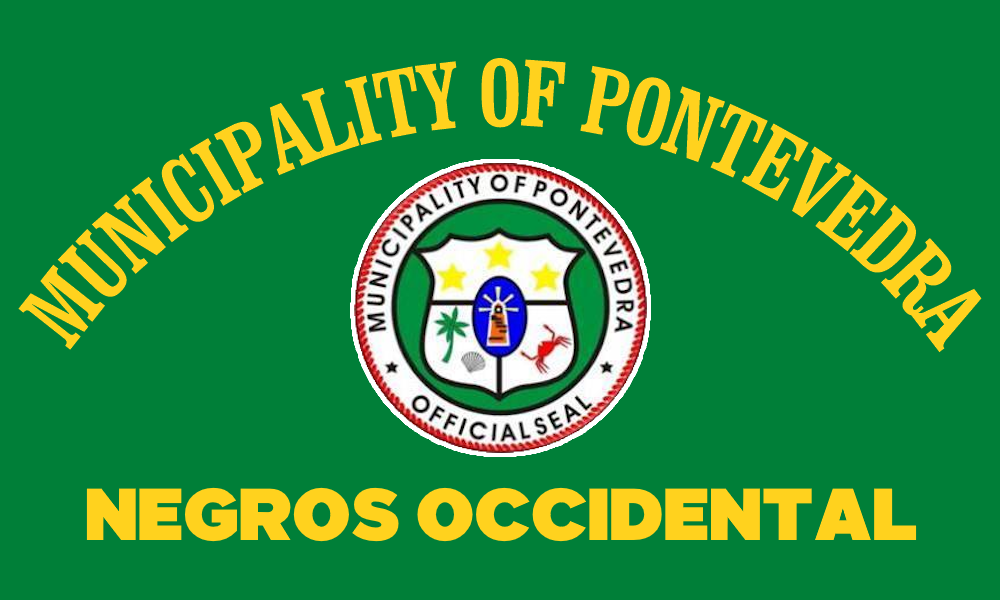
- Flag Seal

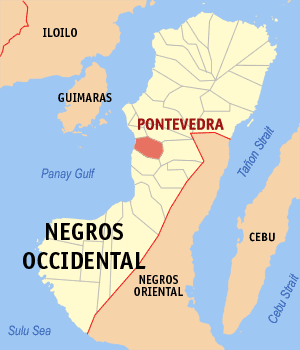
- Map of Negros Occidental with Pontevedra highlighted
- Interactive map of Pontevedra
- Location within the Philippines
- Coordinates: 10°22′N 122°53′E
- Country: Philippines
- Region: Negros Island Region
- Province: Negros Occidental
- District: 4th district
- Named for: Pontevedra, Spain
- Barangays: 20 (see Barangays)

Government
  - Type: Sangguniang Bayan
  - Mayor: Jose Maria A. Alonso (UNegA)
  - Vice Mayor: Ma. Silveria Gilbor-Matti (UNegA)
  - Representative: Jeffrey P. Ferrer (NUP)
  - Municipal Council: Members: Cecilia E. Garita; Giacomo M. Alonso; Elmo V. Gavituya; Arnold B. Lamela; Armando E. Ea; Jonathan J. Bayona; Dan D. Perez; Jimmy C. Gavan; Edgar Siando ^{‡}; Remar A. Lascano ^{◌}; ‡ ex officio ABC president; ◌ ex officio SK chairman
  - Electorate: 33,931 voters (2025)

Area
  - Total: 112.50 km^{2} (43.44 sq mi)
- Elevation: 6.0 m (19.7 ft)
- Highest elevation: 34 m (112 ft)
- Lowest elevation: 0 m (0 ft)

Population (2024 census)
  - Total: 54,941
  - Density: 488.36/km^{2} (1,264.9/sq mi)
  - Households: 13,467

Economy
  - Income class: 1st municipal income class
  - Poverty incidence: 20.92% (2023)
  - Revenue: ₱ 247.9 million (2024)
  - Assets: ₱ 657.7 million (2024)
  - Expenditure: ₱ 217.8 million (2024)
  - Liabilities: ₱ 206.4 million (2024)

Service provider
  - Electricity: Negros Occidental Electric Cooperative (NOCECO)
- Time zone: UTC+8 (PST)
- ZIP code: 6105
- PSGC: 064521000
- IDD : area code: +63 (0)34
- Native languages: Hiligaynon; Tagalog
- Named after: Pontevedra, Spain

Pontevedra, officially the Municipality of Pontevedra, is a municipality in the province of Negros Occidental, Philippines. According to the 2024 census, it has a population of 54,941 people.

The town celebrates the annual Handurayo Festival every May.

Former actress Rio Diaz served as vice mayor of the town from 1998 to 2004.

== History ==
On October 22, 1962, 22 striking workers in the La Carlota milling districts' 11 haciendas were convicted by the Ponteverda peace court of resistance and disobedience to agents of authority, and placed in a small cell that was made for two to three people. Upon receiving reports about their squalid conditions, President Diosdado Macapagal granted them all executive clemency on November 9, 1962.

== Geography ==
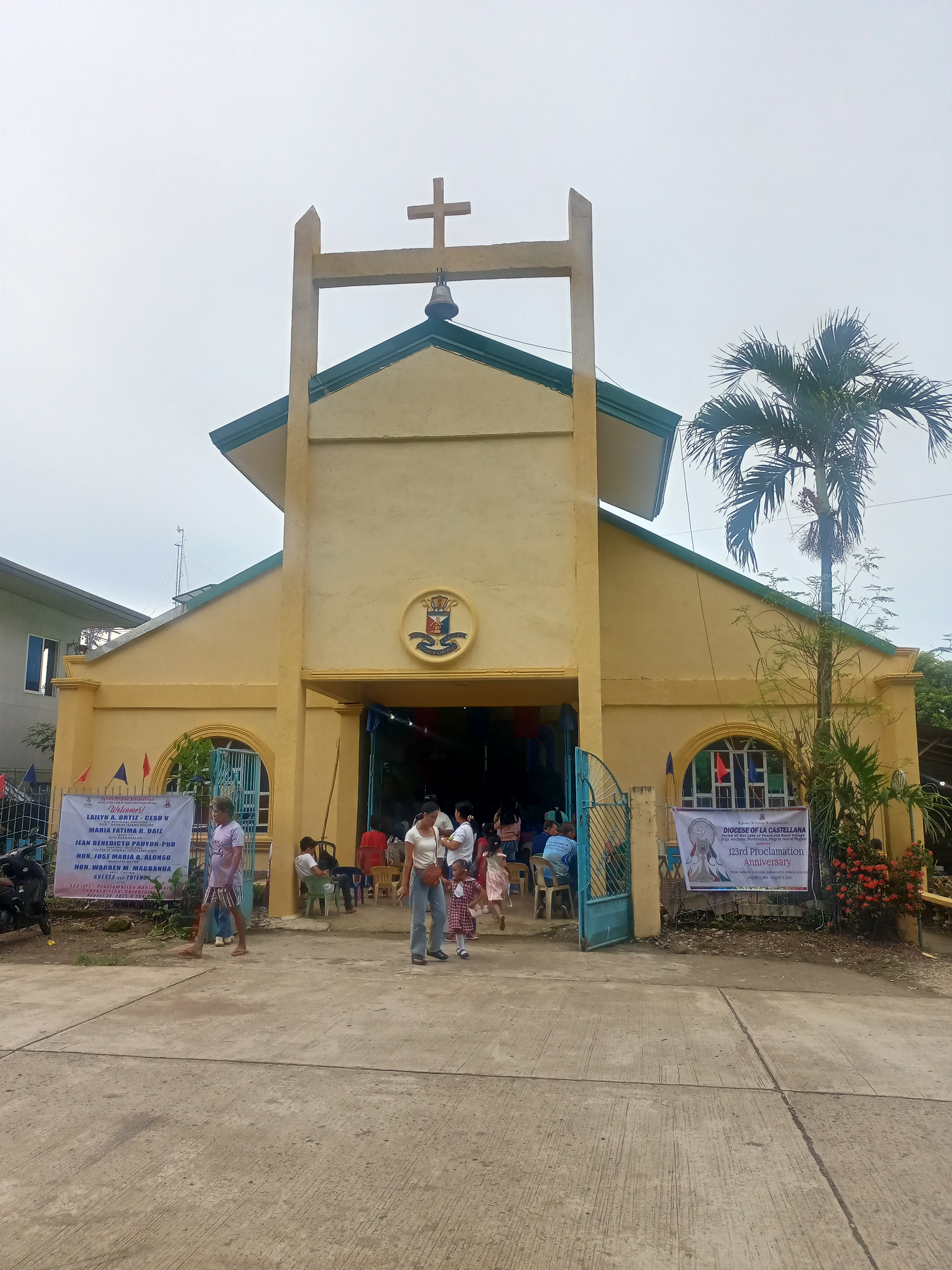
The Parish Church of Our Lady of Peace and Good Voyage of the Iglesia Filipina Independiente in Brgy. Antipolo, Pontevedra

Also known as Marayo, the town center or poblacion of Pontevedra is anchored by the St. Michael the Archangel Parish, with the Saint Michael Academy located adjacent to it. To the east lies the Public Market, extending to Barangay Antipolo, known for housing prominent haciendero families and political clans. The western side of the town offers scenic views of Panay Gulf and the nearby islands of Guimaras and Panay.

At the northern end is Barangay San Juan, named after Saint John the Baptist and known for the locally grown turnips. The southern boundary is Barangay Miranda, which borders Hinigaran, where fishing is the primary livelihood of the residents.

Pontevedra is 40 kilometres (25 mi) from Bacolod and 175 kilometres (109 mi) from Dumaguete.

=== Barangays ===
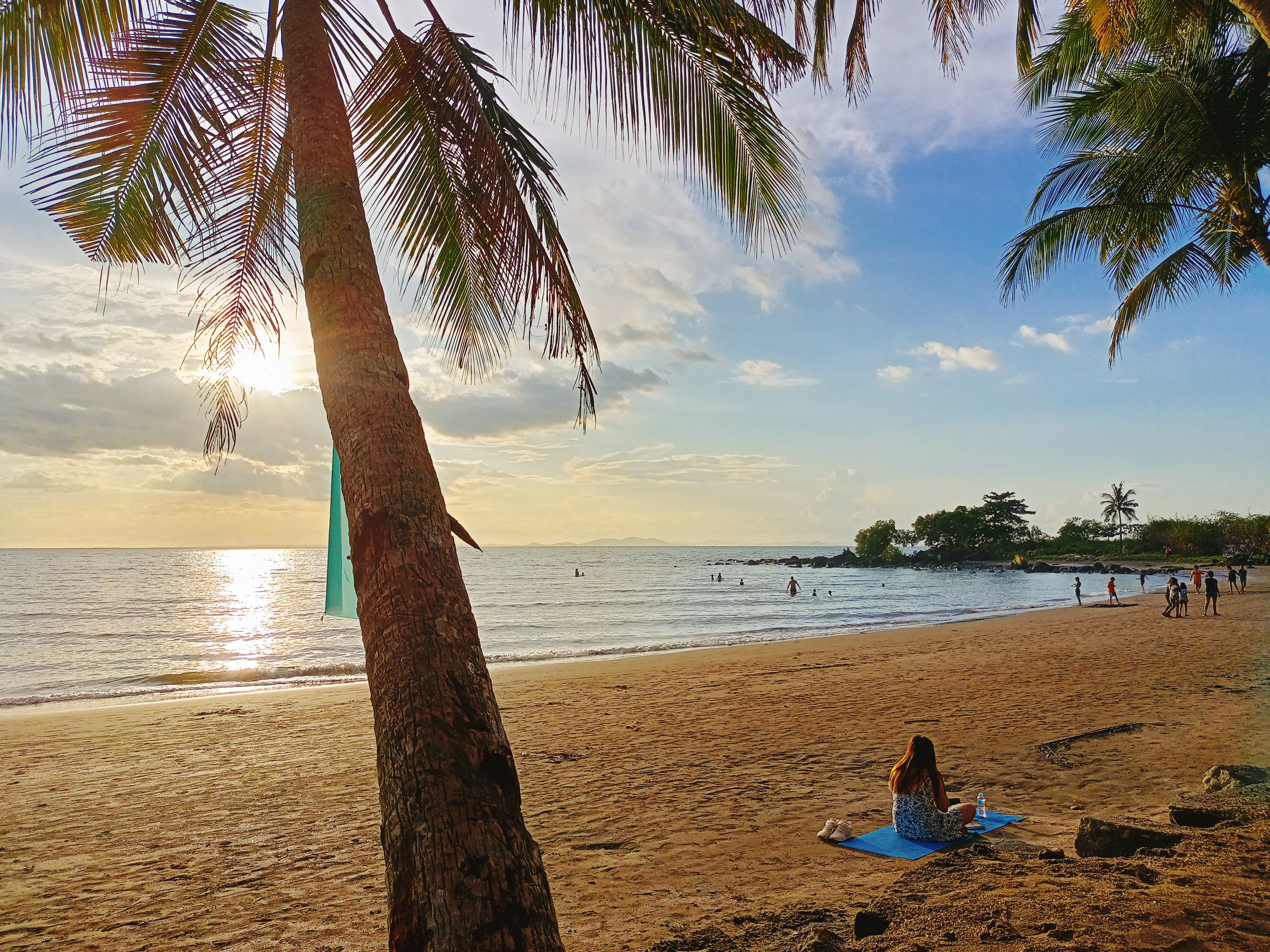
Royal Villa Beach Resort in Barangay Miranda

Pontevedra is politically subdivided into 20 barangays. Each barangay consists of puroks and some have sitios.

- Antipolo
- Barangay I (Poblacion)
- Barangay II (Poblacion)
- Barangay III (Poblacion)
- Buenavista Gibong
- Buenavista Rizal
- Burgos
- Cambarus
- Canroma
- General Malvar
- Gomez
- M. H. Del Pilar
- Mabini
- Miranda
- Pandan
- Recreo
- San Isidro
- San Juan
- Zamora

=== Climate ===
Climate data for Pontevedra, Negros Occidental
| Month | Jan | Feb | Mar | Apr | May | Jun | Jul | Aug | Sep | Oct | Nov | Dec | Year |
|---|---|---|---|---|---|---|---|---|---|---|---|---|---|
| Mean daily maximum °C (°F) | 30 (86) | 31 (88) | 32 (90) | 33 (91) | 32 (90) | 30 (86) | 29 (84) | 29 (84) | 29 (84) | 29 (84) | 30 (86) | 30 (86) | 30 (87) |
| Mean daily minimum °C (°F) | 22 (72) | 22 (72) | 22 (72) | 24 (75) | 25 (77) | 25 (77) | 25 (77) | 24 (75) | 24 (75) | 24 (75) | 23 (73) | 23 (73) | 24 (74) |
| Average precipitation mm (inches) | 38 (1.5) | 29 (1.1) | 55 (2.2) | 65 (2.6) | 141 (5.6) | 210 (8.3) | 212 (8.3) | 176 (6.9) | 180 (7.1) | 180 (7.1) | 130 (5.1) | 70 (2.8) | 1,486 (58.6) |
| Average rainy days | 9.0 | 7.2 | 11.1 | 13.5 | 25.6 | 28.4 | 28.9 | 27.3 | 26.9 | 27.7 | 21.8 | 13.8 | 241.2 |
Source: Meteoblue

== Demographics ==
Population census of Pontevedra
| Year | Pop. | ±% p.a. |
|---|---|---|
| 1903 | 9,538 | — |
| 1918 | 10,817 | +0.84% |
| 1939 | 20,495 | +3.09% |
| 1948 | 18,060 | −1.40% |
| 1960 | 22,751 | +1.94% |
| 1970 | 27,007 | +1.73% |
| 1975 | 30,575 | +2.52% |
| 1980 | 33,258 | +1.70% |
| 1990 | 40,094 | +1.89% |
| 1995 | 42,443 | +1.07% |
| 2000 | 42,089 | −0.18% |
| 2007 | 46,768 | +1.46% |
| 2010 | 47,945 | +0.91% |
| 2015 | 51,866 | +1.51% |
| 2020 | 54,502 | +1.05% |
| 2024 | 54,941 | +0.19% |
Source: Philippine Statistics Authority

== Economy ==
Poverty incidence of Pontevedra (%)

Source: Philippine Statistics Authority
