= SAGIP Partylist =

Philippine political organization

SAGIP
- — Philippine partylist —
- Full name: Social Amelioration and Genuine Intervention on Poverty
- President: Paolo Marcoleta
- Type: Sectoral party
- Sector(s) represented: Urban poor
- Colors: Red, Blue
- Slogan: Kinabukasan ay Sagipin!

Current representation (20th Congress)
- Seats in the House of Representatives: 1 / 3 (Out of 63 party-list seats)
- Representative(s): Paolo Marcoleta

Website
- sagippartylist.org

The Social Amelioration and Genuine Intervention on Poverty (SAGIP), also known as the SAGIP Partylist, is a political organization with party-list representation in the House of Representatives of the Philippines.

== Background ==
The Social Amelioration and Genuine Intervention on Poverty (SAGIP) organization was initially established as 1-SAGIP (The "1" was later dropped). It was approved as a partylist organization by the Commission on Elections to represent the urban poor sector. It took part in the 2013 elections with retired teacher and book distributor Erlinda Santiago as its first nominee. The group also had the endorsement of the Iglesia ni Cristo at least for that particular campaign. 1-SAGIP managed to secure a seat in the House of Representatives.

For the 2016 elections, SAGIP changed their first nominee to Rodante Marcoleta, a former representative of the Alagad partylist and a lawyer. SAGIP managed to retain their single seat in the 2016 and 2019 elections. It won an additional seat in the 2022 elections.

== Electoral performance ==
| Election | Votes | % | Party-list seats |
|---|---|---|---|
| 2013 | 287,739 | 1.04 | 1 / 59 |
| 2016 | 397,064 | 1.23 | 1 / 59 |
| 2019 | 257,313 | 0.92 | 1 / 61 |
| 2022 | 780,456 | 2.12 | 2 / 63 |
| 2025 | 405,297 | 0.97 | 1 / 63 |

== Representatives to Congress ==
| Period | 1st Representative | 2nd Representative |
|---|---|---|
| 16th Congress; 2013–2016 | Erlinda Santiago | —N/a |
| 17th Congress; 2016–2019 | Rodante Marcoleta | —N/a |
| 18th Congress; 2019–2022 | Rodante Marcoleta | —N/a |
| 19th Congress; 2022–2025 | Caroline Tanchay | Rodante Marcoleta |
| 20th Congress; 2025–present | Paolo Marcoleta | —N/a |
Note: A party-list group, can win a maximum of three seats in the House of Representatives.
