= Jaime Cojuangco =

Filipino politician

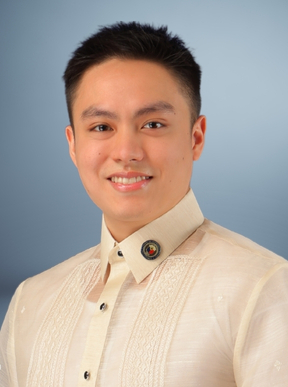
- Official portrait, 2025

Member of the Philippine House of Representatives from Tarlac's 1st District
- Incumbent
- Assumed office June 30, 2022
- Preceded by: Charlie Cojuangco

Personal details
- Born: Jaime Eduardo Marc Diaz Cojuangco; April 12, 1997 (age 29) Quezon City, Philippines
- Party: NPC (2021–present)
- Parents: Charlie Cojuangco (father); Rio Diaz (mother)
- Relatives: Cojuangco family Gloria Diaz (aunt); Isabelle Daza (cousin); Georgina Wilson (cousin)
- Occupation: Politician

Jaime Eduardo Marc Diaz Cojuangco (born April 12, 1997) is a Filipino politician who is the representative of the 1st district of Tarlac in the House of Representatives of the Philippines. He is a member of the NPC, the party founded by his grandfather, Danding Cojuangco. Cojuangco assumed office in 2022 as a substitute for his father, the late congressman Charlie Cojuangco.

== Career ==
Running under the NPC, Cojuangco won the May 9, 2022, elections by a significant margin, defeating independent candidate Joseph Ramac.
