= Charlie Cojuangco =

Filipino politician (1963–2022)

Member of the Philippine House of Representatives
- In office June 30, 2016 – February 22, 2022
- Preceded by: Vacant (Note: Henry Cojuangco died while in the middle of the term, and there is no assigned temporary caretaker)
- Succeeded by: Vacant (Note: Charlie Cojuangco died while in the middle of the term, and there is no assigned temporary caretaker. Later substituted and succeeded by Jaime Diaz Cojuangco)
- Constituency: Tarlac's 1st district
- In office June 30, 1998 – June 30, 2007
- Preceded by: Edward M. Matti
- Succeeded by: Jeffrey P. Ferrer
- Constituency: Negros Occidental's 4th district

Personal details
- Born: Carlos Oppen Cojuangco; April 14, 1963 Philippines
- Died: February 22, 2022 (aged 58) Philippines
- Party: NPC (1998–2022)
- Other political affiliations: UNEGA (2001–2004)
- Spouse(s): Rio Diaz (died 2004) China Jocson (m. 2021)
- Children: 2 (including Jaime)
- Parent: Danding Cojuangco (father)
- Relatives: Cojuangco family
- Occupation: Politician, businessman

Carlos "Charlie" Oppen Cojuangco (April 14, 1963 – February 22, 2022) was a Filipino politician who served in the Philippine House of Representatives for two different districts: Tarlac's 1st district and Negros Occidental's 4th district.

== Political career ==
Cojuangco served in the Philippine House of Representatives as congressman of Negros Occidental's 4th district from 1998 to 2007, and then as congressman of Tarlac's 1st district from 2016 until his death, when he replaced his uncle Henry Cojuangco, who died in 2015 and did not finish his term. Both were members of the Nationalist People's Coalition (NPC).

== Death ==
In October 2021, while driving at the Clark International Speedway race track in Pampanga province, he suffered a brain aneurysm and underwent emergency surgery to which he never recovered. He eventually died on February 22, 2022, although the exact cause of his death was not disclosed.

Cojuangco was supposed to run for a third consecutive term, so his son Jaime Cojuangco substituted for him, and subsequently won in the elections.

== Personal life ==
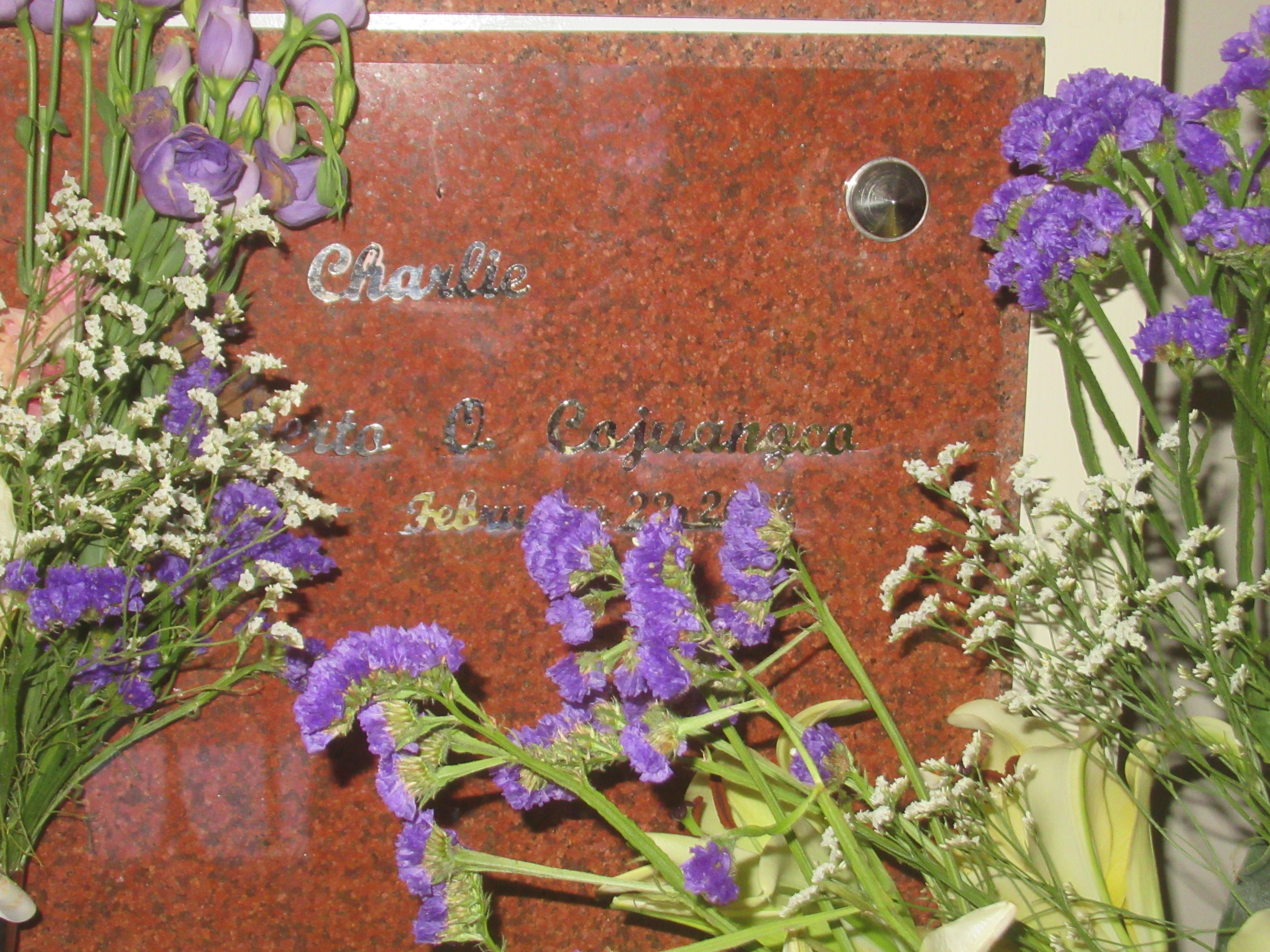
Cojuangco's grave at the Mount Carmel Shrine columbarium in Quezon City

Cojuangco was the son of business magnate and NPC founder Danding Cojuangco and brother of another congressman Mark Cojuangco. He married former Eat Bulaga! co-host Rio Diaz, but she died in 2004. He then married China Jocson, a media personality and former government official, in October 2021. He also had a previous relationship with actress Sharon Cuneta.
