= Abigail Valte =

Philippine politician

Presidential Deputy Spokesperson
- In office July 1, 2010 – January 1, 2016
- President: Benigno S. Aquino III
- Preceded by: Rogelio Peyuan
- Succeeded by: China Jocson

Undersecretary, Office of the President

Personal details
- Born: Abigail dela Fuente; December 23, 1980 (age 45)
- Spouse: Gerard Valte
- Children: Inaki Valte
- Education: De La Salle University (AB); Ateneo de Manila University (JD)
- Occupation: Lawyer, Government Official
- Profession: Lawyer

Abigail "Abi" dela Fuente Valte (born 23 December 1980) is a lawyer who served as the former Deputy Presidential Spokesman of Philippine President Benigno Aquino III.

== Education ==
Valte earned a degree in A.B. Philosophy from De La Salle University in 2002. In 2003, she was admitted to the Ateneo Law School; she successfully completed its Juris Doctor program in 2007. She was entered to the Integrated Bar of the Philippines in May 2008.

== Career ==
Valte was a Junior Associate for Litigation and Labor at Escudero Marasigan Vallente & E.H. Villareal, a law firm based in Pasig. She handled various cases within the scope of Family law, Estate law and Criminal Law. In November 2009, she volunteered at the media bureau of the Presidential campaign of Benigno S. Aquino III, and was eventually assigned as the unit head.

She entered government service on 1 July 2010, when she was appointed by President Benigno S. Aquino III as Deputy Presidential Spokesperson under the Office of the President. Valte was also tasked to be part of the Administration's study group on the Freedom of Information bill. In addition to her press duties, she was a member of the Open Data Philippines Task Force and served as Deputy Director General for Strategic Messaging of the Asia-Pacific Economic Cooperation (APEC) Philippines 2015 National Organizing Committee. In June 2016, she received a Presidential Medal of Merit for her work in the Philippines' successful hosting of APEC from President Benigno S. Aquino III.

Valte was part of the Philippine Delegation to the Permanent Court of Arbitration in The Hague, where the Philippines successfully presented its case against China, in relation to the South China Sea. She was responsible for updating media on the developments in the hearings, because the arbitral proceedings were closed to media coverage.

She took a leave of absence as Deputy Presidential Spokesperson in January 2016 to focus on the campaign of Liberal Party presidential candidate for 2016 elections, Mar Roxas. As part of Roxas' core team, she served as his communications coordinator, ensuring that communications efforts of the different campaign units were in sync.

She is currently the COO of DDI Strategic Communications, a public affairs and communications consultancy based in the Philippines Valte is also a frequent speaker for communications capacity building workshops by the APEC Secretariat, aimed at helping host economies prepare communications and media strategies for their hosting year.
