= Rio Diaz =

Filipino actress and model

Rio Díaz

Vice Mayor of Pontevedra, Negros Occidental
- In office June 30, 1998 – June 30, 2001
- Mayor: Jose Benito Alonso
- Preceded by: Jose Benito Alonso
- Succeeded by: Edgar Tomas

Personal details
- Born: Rosario Aspillera Díaz; August 14, 1959 Manila, Philippines
- Died: October 4, 2004 (aged 45) Daly City, California, U.S.
- Resting place: Basilica of the National Shrine of Our Lady of Mount Carmel Crypt, Quezon City
- Party: NPC
- Spouses: Hajji Alejandro (separated); Charlie Cojuangco (m. 1994)
- Children: 3 (including Jaime Cojuangco)
- Relatives: Cojuangco family (by marriage)
- Occupation: Model, presenter, actress, politician

Rio Díaz Cojuangco (Tagalog: [ˈɾijo ˈdɪas kɔˈhwaŋkɔ]; born Rosario Aspillera Díaz; August 14, 1959 – October 4, 2004), was a Filipino beauty queen, television presenter, actress and politician. The sister of former Miss Universe 1969 Gloria Díaz, she was diagnosed with stage four colon cancer and died in the United States in 2004. She was an aunt of Georgina Wilson, through another sister Aurora who is Wilson's mother.

== Biography ==
Born in Manila, Díaz was the youngest of twelve children born to Jaime Díaz and Teresa Aspillera. A ramp and commercial model, she was crowned Mutya ng Pilipinas in 1977 and won Fourth Runner-up in the Miss Asia Pageant that same year.

Díaz began a relationship with musician Hajji Alejandro, and together they emigrated to Los Angeles, California, where they operated a small restaurant along Melrose Avenue. They had a son named Ali Alejandro.

After separating from Alejandro, Díaz returned to the Philippines and resumed her career in entertainment. She co-hosted Eat Bulaga! in 1991 and stayed for a couple of years before meeting Charlie Cojuangco on a blind date in 1993 and marrying him the following year. For the greater part of the 1990s, Díaz worked for television and starred in several films. They had 2 children, Jaime Diaz Cojuangco and Claudia Diaz Cojuangco.

=== Politics ===
Diaz, similar to her first husband Hajji Alejandro, was a supporter of former President Ferdinand Marcos, even after his deposition in the People Power Revolution.

She was elected vice-mayor of Pontevedra, Negros Occidental, in the 1998 elections, while her husband won a seat in Congress. Díaz later became president of the vice-mayors' league of Negros Occidental. Diaz opted not to seek re-election in 2004 due to her illness, and was succeeded by her ally councilor Edgar Tomas.

=== Illness and death ===
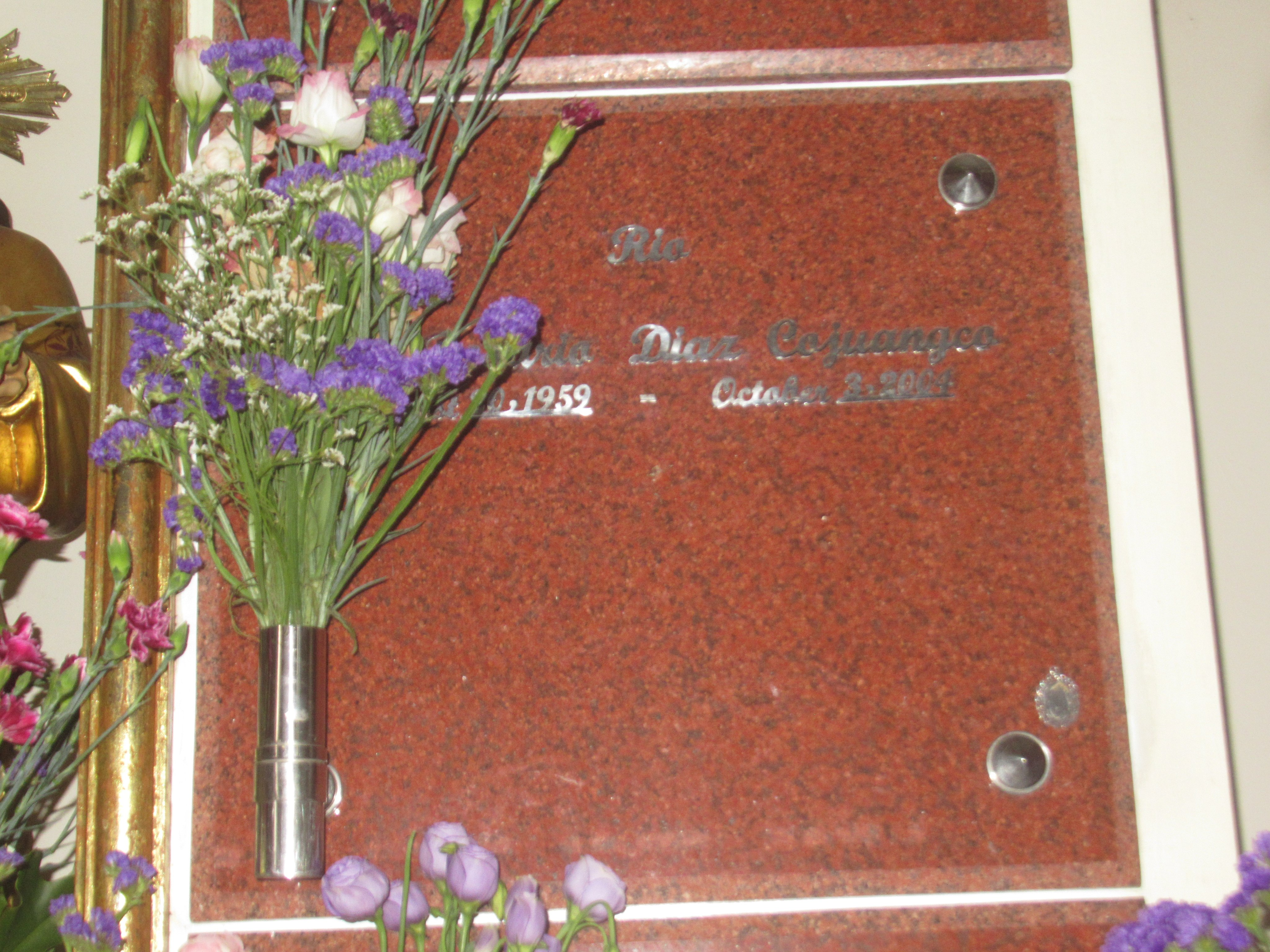
Rio Diaz's grave at the Mount Carmel Shrine columbarium in Quezon City

During a routine checkup in December 1998, her American doctors informed her of a small growth in her left abdomen. After a six-hour surgery, they found a malignant tumour in its fourth stage, and Díaz was given three months to live. She underwent another operation, and received chemotherapy for three months.

In 1999, Stanford oncologist Dr George Fisher, declared she had been cured. When the cancer cells returned in May 2000, Rio travelled back to Stanford for an eight-hour surgical procedure and another round of chemotherapy sessions. Díaz stopped the sessions in 2002, citing her body's inability to cope further, but her physicians later that year said she had no recourse but to continue treatment.

Six years after the original diagnosis, Díaz died on October 4, 2004, at Seton Medical Center in Daly City, California, at the age of 45. Her remains were cremated and inurned at the Cojuangcos' Hacienda Balvina in Pontevedra, Negros Occidental. These were later moved to the columbarium of Mount Carmel Shrine in Quezon City.

== Filmography ==
=== Film ===
- Sísingilín Ko ng Dugo (1990)
- Sam & Miguel (Your Basura, No Problema) (1992) as Mila
- Tunay Na Magkaibigan, Walang Iwanan...Peksman (1994)

=== Television ===
- Eat Bulaga! (1992–1996)
- Sarap TV (1998–1999)
- Maalaala Mo Kaya, "Pictures: The Rio Díaz-Cojuangco Story" - as herself (in a part of her story; mostly played by Eula Valdez; 2003)
