= Edna Marcoleta =

Wife of Filipino politician Rodante Marcoleta

Edna Magbitang Marcoleta is the wife of Filipino politician and Senator Rodante Marcoleta. She is a director at Stronghold Insurance Company, a role that became subject to scrutiny in September 2025 regarding bond guarantees for controversial infrastructure projects that involve the flood control scandal, which Senator Marcoleta has denied, clarifying her role as an independent, non-executive director.

== Background ==
Edna Magbitang is from Anao, Tarlac and is married to Rodante Marcoleta, Senator in the Philippines since 2025. She is the mother of Paolo Marcoleta, a SAGIP-Party list Representative since 2025. She was active in the Congressional Spouses Foundation, and served as the Party-List regional head starting in 2022. On inauguration day in 2022, her husband and her instead went on a date.

== Controversy ==
In late 2025, reports emerged alleging a conflict of interest due to the insurance where she was a director was closely working for projects linked to the Discaya family specifically on ghost and flood control projects. Both she and her husband have vehemently denied the links to each other. Fact-checkers have confirmed that her role, despite speculation that it was executive director, is that of an independent director without participation in managing and operation. She does, however, chair the firm audit committee.
