= Negros Occidental's at-large congressional district =

Legislative district of the Philippines

Negros Occidental's at-large congressional district refers to the provincewide electoral district that was used to elect members of Philippine national legislatures in Negros Occidental before 1987.

Negros Occidental first elected its representatives at-large in the 1943 Philippine legislative election for a seat in the National Assembly of the Second Philippine Republic, with a separate district created for Bacolod being a chartered city since 1938. Before 1943, the province including its capital city was represented in the national legislatures through its first, second and third districts. The province was also earlier represented in the Malolos Congress of the First Philippine Republic in 1898 by appointed delegates residing in Luzon.

The three districts were restored in Negros Occidental ahead of the 1941 Philippine House of Representatives elections whose elected representatives only began to serve following the dissolution of the Second Republic and the restoration of the Philippine Commonwealth in 1945. An at-large district would not be used in the province again until the 1984 Philippine parliamentary election for seven seats in the Batasang Pambansa which it shared with its highly-urbanized capital city. It became obsolete following the 1987 reapportionment under a new constitution that divided Negros Occidental into six congressional districts and re-established Bacolod's at-large district.

== Representation history ==
| # | Term of office | | National Assembly | Seat A | | | | Seat B | | | | Seat C | | | | | | | | | | | | | | | | | | | |
| # | Start | End | National Assembly | Image | Member | Party | Electoral history | Image | Member | Party | Electoral history | Image | Member | Party | Electoral history | | | | | | | | | | | | | | | | |
=== Negros Occidental's at-large district for the Malolos Congress ===
District created June 18, 1898.
| – | September 15, 1898 | March 23, 1901 | 1st | | Juan Benson | Independent | Appointed. | | Antonio Montenegro | Independent | Appointed. | | José M. de la Viña | Independent | Appointed. | | | | | | | | | | | | | | | | |
| # | Term of office | | National Assembly | Seat A | | | | Seat B | | | | Seats eliminated | | | | | | | | | | | | | | | | | | | |
| # | Start | End | National Assembly | Image | Member | Party | Electoral history | Image | Member | Party | Electoral history | Seats eliminated | | | | | | | | | | | | | | | | | | | |
| === Negros Occidental's at-large district for the National Assembly (Second Philippine Republic) === | | | | | | | | | | | | Seats eliminated | | | | | | | | | | | | | | | | | | | |
| District re-created September 7, 1943. | | | | | | | | | | | | Seats eliminated | | | | | | | | | | | | | | | | | | | |
| – | September 25, 1943 | February 2, 1944 | 1st | | Gil Montilla | KALIBAPI | Elected in 1943. | | Vicente F. Gustilo | KALIBAPI | Appointed as an ex officio member. | Seats eliminated | | | | | | | | | | | | | | | | | | | |
| District dissolved into Negros Occidental's 1st, 2nd and 3rd districts. | | | | | | | | | | | | Seats eliminated | | | | | | | | | | | | | | | | | | | |
| # | Term of office | | Batasang Pambansa | Seat A | | | | Seat B | | | | Seat C | | | | Seat D | | | | Seat E | | | | Seat F | | | | Seat G | | | |
| # | Start | End | Batasang Pambansa | Image | Member | Party | Electoral history | Image | Member | Party | Electoral history | Image | Member | Party | Electoral history | Image | Member | Party | Electoral history | Image | Member | Party | Electoral history | Image | Member | Party | Electoral history | Image | Member | Party | Electoral history |
=== Negros Occidental's at-large district for the Regular Batasang Pambansa ===
District re-created February 1, 1984.
| – | July 23, 1984 | March 25, 1986 | 2nd | | Wilson P. Gamboa | UNIDO | Elected in 1984. | | Antonio M. Gatuslao | Independent | Elected in 1984. | | Roberto A. Gatuslao | KBL | Elected in 1984. | | Jaime G. Golez | KBL | Elected in 1984. | | Alfredo G. Marañon Jr. | KBL | Elected in 1984. | | Roberto L. Montelibano | KBL | Elected in 1984. | | Jose Y. Varela Jr. | KBL | Elected in 1984. |
District dissolved into Negros Occidental's 1st, 2nd, 3rd, 4th, 5th, 6th and Bacolod's at-large districts.

== See also ==
- Legislative districts of Negros Occidental
