= Negros Occidental's 4th congressional district =

Legislative district of the Philippines

- Constituency for the House of Representatives of the Philippines
- Boundary of Negros Occidental's 4th congressional district in Negros Occidental
- Location of Negros Occidental within the Philippines
- Province: Negros Occidental
- Region: Negros Island Region
- Population: 406,666 (2020)
- Electorate: 241,130 (2022)
- Major settlements: 6 LGUs: Cities; Bago; La Carlota; Municipalities; Pontevedra; Pulupandan; San Enrique; Valladolid
- Area: 750.86 km^{2} (289.91 sq mi)

Current constituency
- Created: 1987
- Representative: Jeffrey P. Ferrer
- Political party: NUP; UNEGA
- Congressional bloc: Majority

Negros Occidental's 4th congressional district is one of the six congressional districts of the Philippines in the province of Negros Occidental. It has been represented in the House of Representatives since 1987. The district consists of the area in north-central Negros Occidental immediately to the south of the capital city of Bacolod. It contains the cities of Bago and La Carlota, and the municipalities of Pontevedra, Pulupandan, San Enrique and Valladolid. It is currently represented in the 20th Congress by Jeffrey P. Ferrer of the National Unity Party (NUP) and United Negros Alliance (UNEGA).

== Representation history ==
#	Image	Member	Term of office		Congress	Party	Electoral history	Constituent LGUs
#	Image	Member	Start	End	Congress	Party	Electoral history	Constituent LGUs
=== Negros Occidental's 4th district for the House of Representatives of the Philippines ===
District created February 2, 1987. Redistricted from Negros Occidental's at-large district.
1		Edward M. Matti	June 30, 1987	June 30, 1998	8th	Lakas ng Bansa	Elected in 1987.	1987–present Bago, La Carlota, Pontevedra, Pulupandan, San Enrique, Valladolid
1		Edward M. Matti	June 30, 1987	June 30, 1998	9th	NPC	Re-elected in 1992.	1987–present Bago, La Carlota, Pontevedra, Pulupandan, San Enrique, Valladolid
1		Edward M. Matti	June 30, 1987	June 30, 1998	10th	NPC	Re-elected in 1995.	1987–present Bago, La Carlota, Pontevedra, Pulupandan, San Enrique, Valladolid
2		Carlos O. Cojuangco	June 30, 1998	June 30, 2007	11th	NPC	Elected in 1998.	1987–present Bago, La Carlota, Pontevedra, Pulupandan, San Enrique, Valladolid
2		Carlos O. Cojuangco	June 30, 1998	June 30, 2007	12th	UNEGA	Re-elected in 2001.	1987–present Bago, La Carlota, Pontevedra, Pulupandan, San Enrique, Valladolid
2		Carlos O. Cojuangco	June 30, 1998	June 30, 2007	13th	NPC	Re-elected in 2004.	1987–present Bago, La Carlota, Pontevedra, Pulupandan, San Enrique, Valladolid
3		Jeffrey P. Ferrer	June 30, 2007	June 30, 2016	14th	NPC (UNEGA)	Elected in 2007.	1987–present Bago, La Carlota, Pontevedra, Pulupandan, San Enrique, Valladolid
3		Jeffrey P. Ferrer	June 30, 2007	June 30, 2016	15th	Independent (UNEGA)	Re-elected in 2010.	1987–present Bago, La Carlota, Pontevedra, Pulupandan, San Enrique, Valladolid
3		Jeffrey P. Ferrer	June 30, 2007	June 30, 2016	16th	NUP (UNEGA)	Re-elected in 2013.	1987–present Bago, La Carlota, Pontevedra, Pulupandan, San Enrique, Valladolid
4		Juliet Marie Ferrer	June 30, 2016	June 30, 2025	17th	NUP (UNEGA)	Elected in 2016.	1987–present Bago, La Carlota, Pontevedra, Pulupandan, San Enrique, Valladolid
4		Juliet Marie Ferrer	June 30, 2016	June 30, 2025	18th	NUP (UNEGA)	Re-elected in 2019.	1987–present Bago, La Carlota, Pontevedra, Pulupandan, San Enrique, Valladolid
4		Juliet Marie Ferrer	June 30, 2016	June 30, 2025	19th	NUP (UNEGA)	Re-elected in 2022.	1987–present Bago, La Carlota, Pontevedra, Pulupandan, San Enrique, Valladolid
(3)		Jeffrey P. Ferrer	June 30, 2025	Incumbent	20th	NUP (UNEGA)	Elected in 2025.	1987–present Bago, La Carlota, Pontevedra, Pulupandan, San Enrique, Valladolid

== Election results ==
=== 2025 ===
2025 Philippine House of Representatives election in the First District of Negros Occidental
Candidate	Party	Votes	%
Jeffrey Ferrer	National Unity Party	130,023	64.20
Lea Delfinado	Nationalist People's Coalition	72,503	35.80
Total		202,526	100.00
National Unity Party hold			
Source: Commission on Elections

=== 2022 ===
2022 Philippine House of Representatives elections
Party	Candidate	Votes	%
NUP	Juliet Marie Ferrer	140,367	
Total votes			
NUP hold			

=== 2019 ===
2019 Philippine House of Representatives elections
Party	Candidate	Votes	%
NUP	Juliet Marie Ferrer	134,041	
Independent	Enrique Erobas	3,511	
PDDS	Ann Joan Lenling	2,004	
Total votes			
NUP hold			

== See also ==
- Legislative districts of Negros Occidental
