= Valladolid, Negros Occidental =

Municipality in Negros Occidental, Philippines

Valladolid
- Municipality
- Municipality of Valladolid
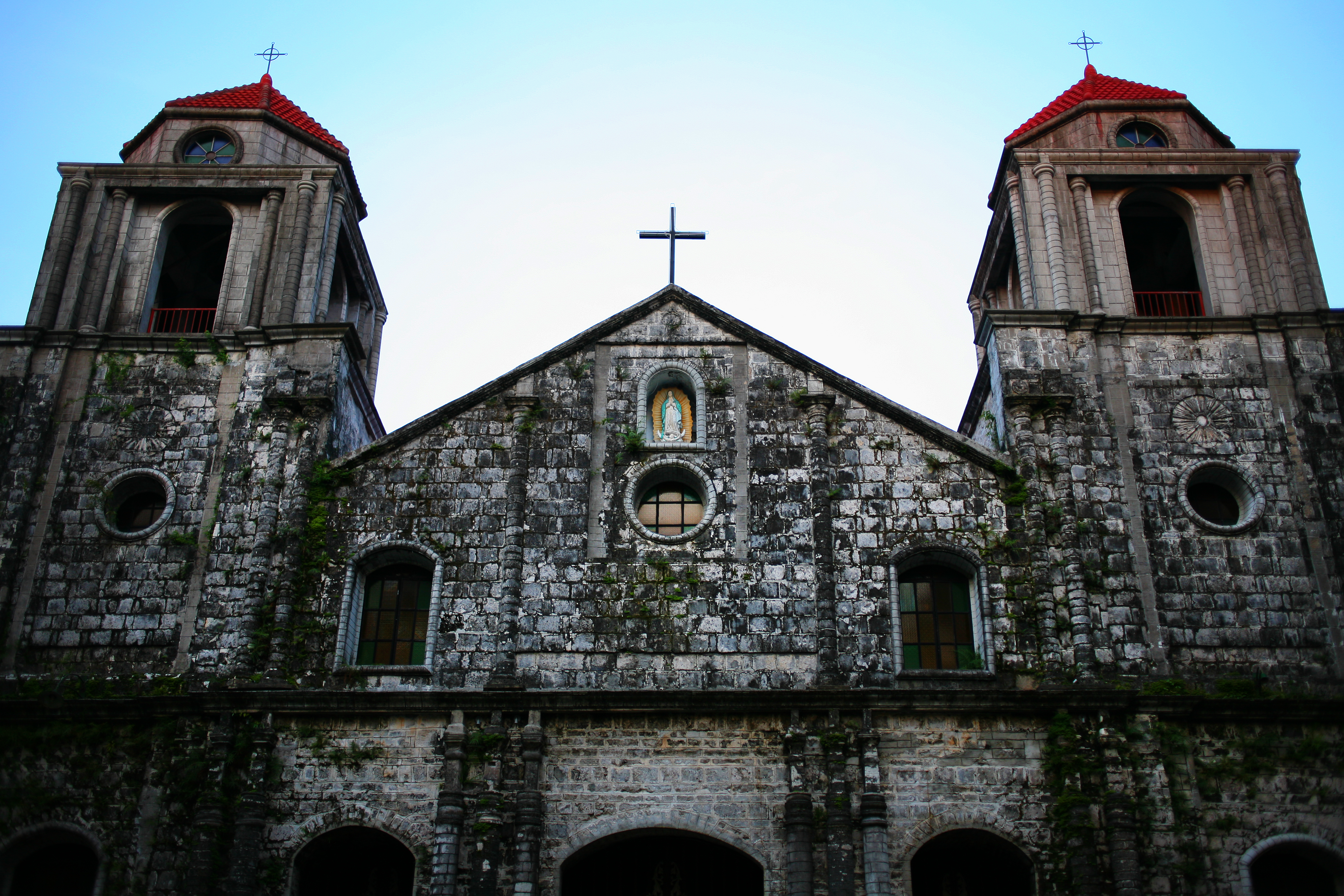
- Façade of Nuestra Señora de Guadalupe Church

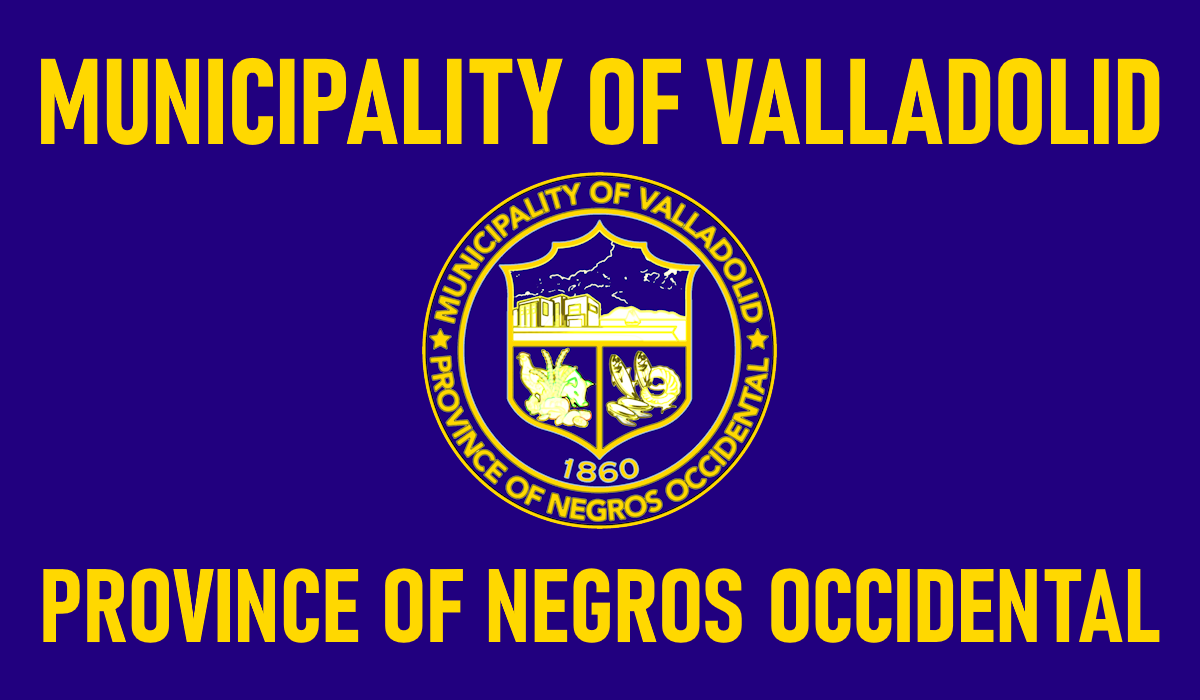
- Flag
- Nicknames: Rice Granary of Negros Occidental; Fruit Basket of Negros Occidental
- Motto: Ugyon Dolidnon
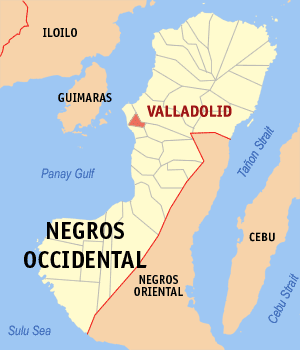
- Map of Negros Occidental with Valladolid highlighted
- Interactive map of Valladolid
- Location within the Philippines
- Coordinates: 10°28′N 122°50′E
- Country: Philippines
- Region: Negros Island Region
- Province: Negros Occidental
- District: 4th district
- Founded: 1860
- Named for: Valladolid, Spain
- Barangays: 16 (see Barangays)

Government
  - Type: Sangguniang Bayan
  - Mayor: Ricardo P. Presbitero Jr. (UNegA)
  - Vice Mayor: Shirley R. Nacion (UNegA)
  - Representative: Jeffrey P. Ferrer (NUP)
  - Municipal Council: Members: Ivar G. Gugudan, Jr.; Nonito G. Bedaure; Noel N. Nacion; Octavio D. Pagsuberon; Larry G. Garde; Rayzel Marie Y. Ramos; Rafael B. Palacios; Jeizyl Jaye G. Villo ^{◌}; ◌ ex officio SK chairman
  - Electorate: 27,057 voters (2025)

Area
  - Total: 48.03 km^{2} (18.54 sq mi)
- Elevation: 4.0 m (13.1 ft)
- Highest elevation: 23 m (75 ft)
- Lowest elevation: 0 m (0 ft)

Population (2024 census)
  - Total: 40,487
  - Density: 843.0/km^{2} (2,183/sq mi)
  - Households: 10,121

Economy
  - Income class: 2nd municipal income class
  - Poverty incidence: 20.23% (2023)
  - Revenue: ₱ 187.6 million (2024)
  - Assets: ₱ 334.3 million (2024)
  - Expenditure: ₱ 166.7 million (2024)
  - Liabilities: ₱ 49.43 million (2024)

Service provider
  - Electricity: Negros Occidental Electric Cooperative (NOCECO)
- Time zone: UTC+8 (PST)
- ZIP code: 6103
- PSGC: 064530000
- IDD : area code: +63 (0)34
- Native languages: Hiligaynon; Tagalog

Valladolid, officially the Municipality of Valladolid, is a municipality in the province of Negros Occidental, Philippines. According to the 2024 census, it has a population of 40,487 people.

Known as the "Fruit Basket of Negros Occidental," the municipality celebrates its fiesta every 28 February.

== Etymology ==
The place was first called “Inabuyan” until the Spanish leaders arrived and one of them named the place after his native town Valladolid in Mexico.

== History ==
During the Spanish era, Valladolid was considered one of the most prosperous towns of Negros Occidental. The size of the convent and church built by the Recollect Missionaries in 1851 were proofs of this status considering that the church authorities were powerful in running the affairs of the government.

Valladolid was established in 1860. The influx of settlers from the neighboring islands of Guimaras, Panay and Cebu prompted the then Governor Saravia to create an additional town which is now Pulupandan. The settlers made this town a landing area in coming to Negros, brought about by the introduction of sugar which resulted in the economic growth and prosperity of the island. The town is known as the Rice Granary of Negros Occidental with 90 percent of its arable land planted to palay. It produce more than half a million cavans of rice every year. It also produces vegetables, fruits and the diwal (Pholas orientalis) also known as the angel wings clam, a seasonal delicacy.

The Aetas were the original inhabitants of Valladolid. They were ultimately forced to move to the uplands when the early settlers and colonizers came to stay. Significant events in the province during the early founding years as well as major upheavals during and after the revolutionary period brought profound changes in the municipality.

By and large, Valladolid has its place in the historical set-up of the province of Negros Occidental socially, spiritually, economically and politically. It is also the bulwark of Filipinistas Aglipayan in Negros. This dominant sect caused the defeat of the fiery Manuel L. Quezon in the hands of the Aglipayans in the presidential election of 1935 during the Commonwealth era.

Pasundayag Festival is a thanksgiving and celebration of good harvest. It is a farmers festival in honor of the town's patroness, Nuestra Señora de Guadalupe featuring street dancing competition, arena festival dance showdown and merry making.

In 1957, Sitio Paloma was converted into a barrio.

== Geography ==
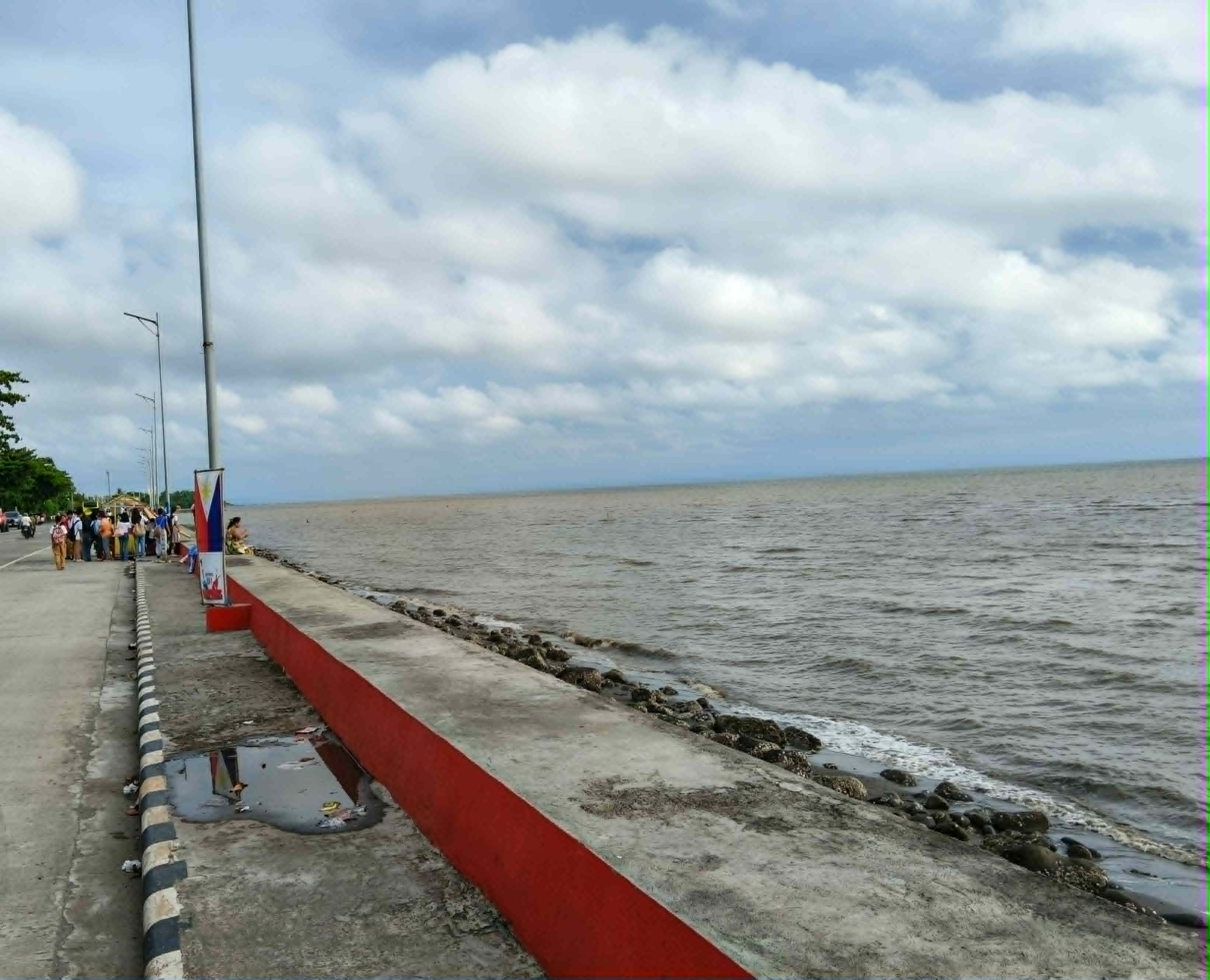
Along the coastal road of the town of Valladolid

Valladolid is bounded on the north by the town of Pulupandan and the city of Bago, on the south by the municipality of San Enrique, on the west by the Guimaras Strait, and on the east by the city of La Carlota. The global location of Municipality of Valladolid is 10 degrees, 27 minutes 54 seconds - north and 122 degrees 49 minutes 33.6 seconds - east with Our Lady of Guadalupe Church as the benchmark.

Valladolid is located on the south-western coast of the province of Negros Occidental. It is 29 kilometres (18 mi) from Bacolod, and 186 kilometres (116 mi) from Dumaguete.

=== Barangays ===
Valladolid is geographically subdivided into 16 barangays. Each barangay consists of puroks and some have sitios.

- Alijis
- Ayungon
- Bagumbayan
- Batuan
- Bayabas
- Central Tabao
- Doldol
- Guintorilan
- Lacaron
- Mabini
- Pacol
- Palaka
- Paloma
- Poblacion
- Sagua Banua
- Tabao Proper

=== Climate ===
Valladolid has two pronounced seasons, wet and dry. The rainy season starts from May to January of the following year with heavy rains occurring during the months of August and September. Dry season starts from the month of February until the last week of April.

Climate data for Valladolid, Negros Occidental
Month	Jan	Feb	Mar	Apr	May	Jun	Jul	Aug	Sep	Oct	Nov	Dec	Year
Mean daily maximum °C (°F)	30 (86)	31 (88)	32 (90)	33 (91)	32 (90)	30 (86)	29 (84)	29 (84)	29 (84)	29 (84)	30 (86)	30 (86)	30 (87)
Mean daily minimum °C (°F)	22 (72)	22 (72)	22 (72)	24 (75)	25 (77)	25 (77)	25 (77)	24 (75)	24 (75)	24 (75)	23 (73)	23 (73)	24 (74)
Average precipitation mm (inches)	38 (1.5)	29 (1.1)	55 (2.2)	65 (2.6)	141 (5.6)	210 (8.3)	212 (8.3)	176 (6.9)	180 (7.1)	180 (7.1)	130 (5.1)	70 (2.8)	1,486 (58.6)
Average rainy days	9.0	7.2	11.1	13.5	25.6	28.4	28.9	27.3	26.9	27.7	21.8	13.8	241.2
Source: Meteoblue

== Demographics ==
Population census of Valladolid
Year	Pop.	±% p.a.
1903	10,550	—
1918	10,213	−0.22%
1939	14,636	+1.73%
1948	13,393	−0.98%
1960	14,891	+0.89%
1970	17,961	+1.89%
1975	21,176	+3.36%
1980	21,728	+0.52%
1990	29,742	+3.19%
1995	31,380	+1.01%
2000	32,576	+0.81%
2007	34,895	+0.95%
2010	36,416	+1.56%
2015	37,833	+0.73%
2020	39,996	+1.18%
2024	40,487	+0.29%
Source: Philippine Statistics Authority

=== Religion ===
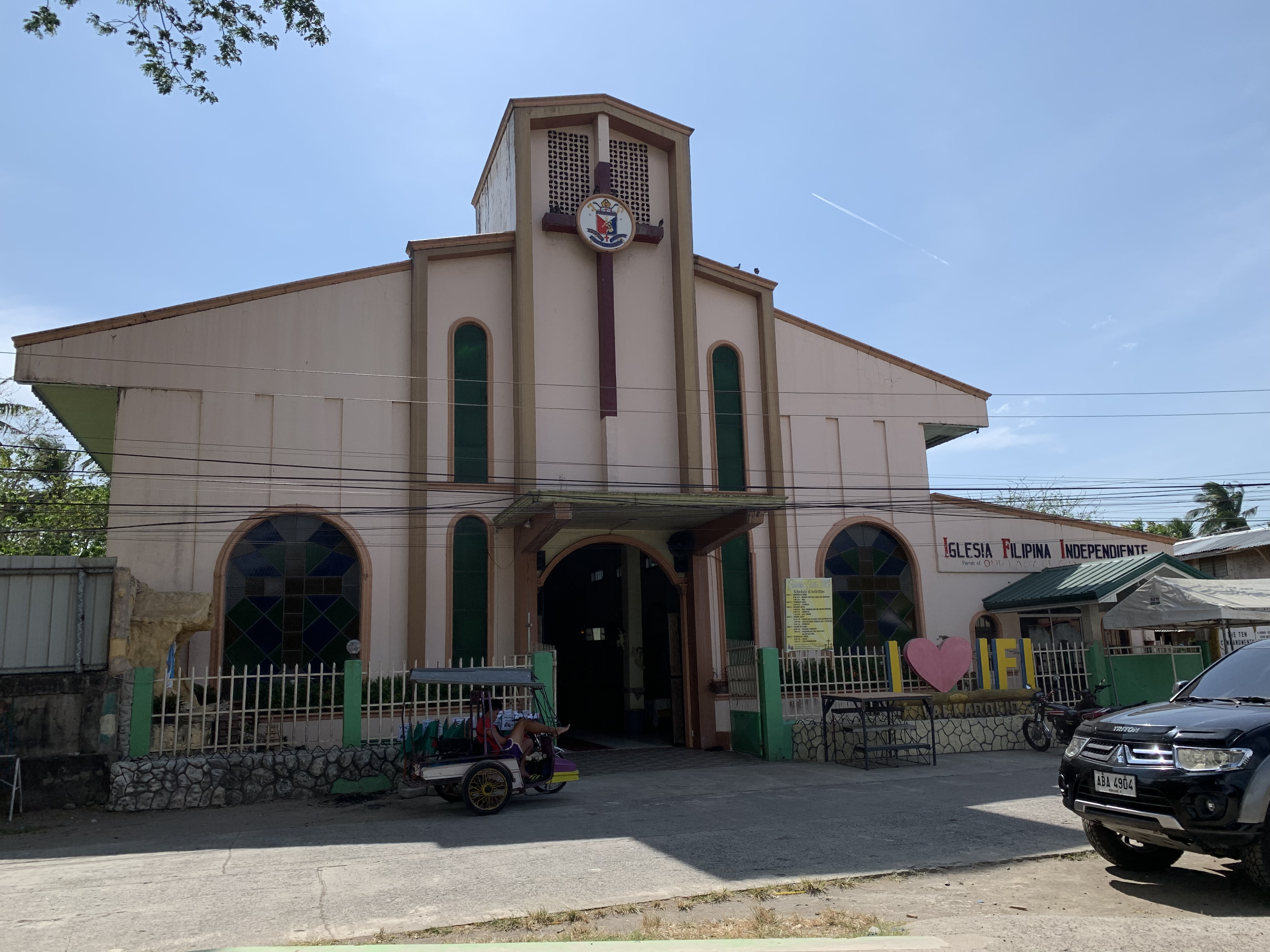
The Parish of Saint Mary of Guadalupe of the Philippine Independent Church.

- Philippine Independent Church – majority of the population of the town are followers of the Aglipayan faith.
- Roman Catholic Church – second largest religious denomination of the town.

== Economy ==
Poverty incidence of Valladolid (%)

Source: Philippine Statistics Authority

=== Major industries ===
- Hog raising
- Furniture
- Fishery
- Poultry
- Rice production
- Sugar production

=== Major products ===
- Hablon (garments)
- Angel Wing Clams
- Mango from Guimaras

== Education ==
=== Primary and elementary schools ===
Public

- Alijis Elementary school
- Ayungon Elementary School
- Batuan Elementary School
- Emilio Infante Elementary School
- Ma. Palacios Presbitero Elementary School
- Pacol Elementary School
- Tabao Elementary School
- Valladolid Elementary School

Private

- Bethel Baptist Church Kindergarten School
- Faith Christian School
- Maranatha Christian Academy
- Negros New Life In Jesus Christian Academy
- Our Lady of Guadalupe Kinder School

=== Secondary level ===
Public

- Tabao National High School
- Tabao National High School - Lacaron Extension
- Valladolid National High School
- Valladolid National High School - Ayungon Extension

Private

- Francisco Infante Memorial High School Inc.

== Infrastructure ==
=== Power ===
Power supply provided by NOCECO with frequent and unpredictable brownouts.

=== Water supply ===
Clean and safe water supply provided by Valladolid Water District.

== Tourism ==
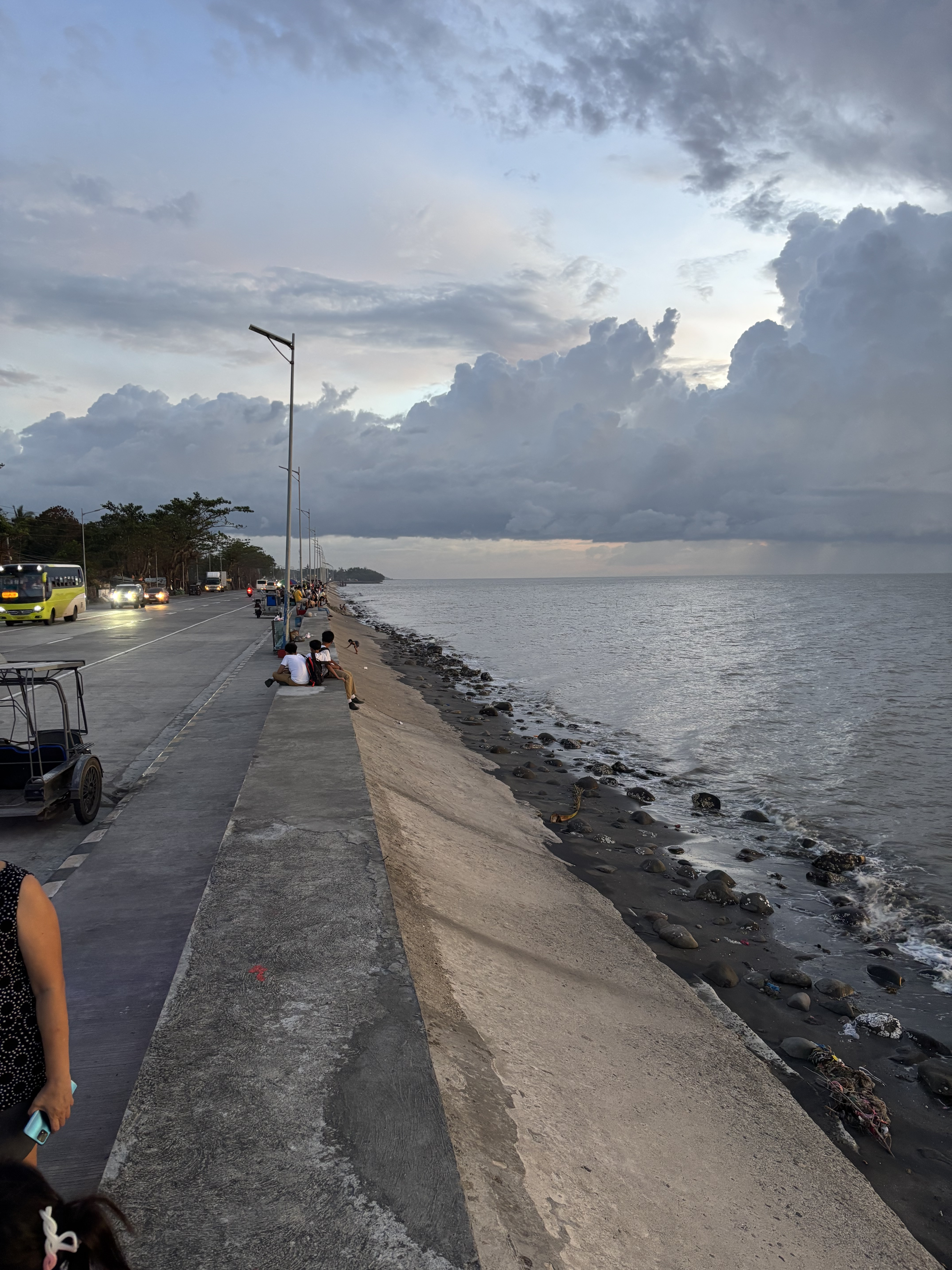
Sunset Boulevard

- Our Lady of Guadalupe Church: Our Lady of Guadalupe Church was founded in 1851 by the Recollect Missionaries and reputed to be the biggest in the province. The size of the church and convent is a living proof that Valladolid stood among the island's most progressive pueblos during the Spanish era.
- Balay Dolid (Valladolid Community Museum): Balay Dolid (Valladolid Community Museum) is one of the ancestral houses in town owned by the Ykalina family. The Valladolid Community Museum features the rich cultural heritage of the town.
- Sunset Boulevard: It is a perfect place to watch the beautiful sunset along the Guimaras Strait. A good venue to commune with nature as the water laps along the seawall.
- Century-old Acacia Haven: 32 Acacia trees surround the public plaza and provide shade to all passers. It was planted by Ykalina, the first town official.
- Relic of an 18th Century Graveyard: This resting place was solely intended for the Ilustrados or the rich member of the community during that time. The area is about 3 hectares surrounded by coral reef stones giving the place a classic effect
