= Paolo Marcoleta =

Filipino politician and party-list representative (born 1976)

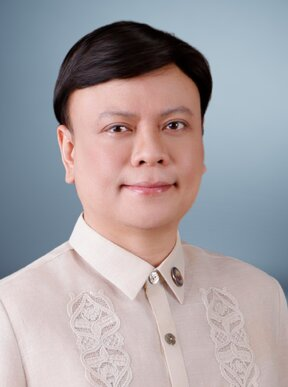
- Official portrait, 2025

Member of the Philippine House of Representatives for SAGIP Partylist
- Incumbent
- Assumed office June 30, 2025
- Preceded by: Caroline Tanchay; Rodante Marcoleta

Personal details
- Born: Paolo Henry Magbitang Marcoleta; August 15, 1976 (age 50)
- Party: SAGIP (partylist; 2024–present)
- Spouse: Ana V. Marcoleta
- Parents: Rodante Marcoleta (father); Edna Marcoleta (mother)
- Education: University of the Philippines Diliman (BA)
- Occupation: Politician; Business executive

Paolo Henry Magbitang Marcoleta (born August 15, 1976) is a Filipino politician serving as the first nominee and representative of the SAGIP Partylist in the 20th Congress of the Philippines. The son of former representative and senator Rodante Marcoleta, he succeeded his father in the party-list position after the elder Marcoleta's election to the Senate in 2025.

== Early life and education ==
Paolo Henry Magbitang Marcoleta was born on August 15, 1976. He is the son of Edna (née Magbitang) and Rodante Marcoleta. He graduated Bachelor's of Arts degree in broadcast communication at the University of the Philippines Diliman in 1998.

== Career ==
=== Political career ===
In the 2025 Philippine general election, Marcoleta assumed the first nominee position of SAGIP Party-list, with the organization winning another House seat under his leadership. During the election period, he joined his father in filing motions before the Commission on Elections regarding voting discrepancies through their legal counsel. The party-list gained one seat in the 20th Congress of the Philippines, with the younger Marcoleta filling it.

=== Acting career ===
Paolo Marcoleta appeared in EBC Films' Guerrero Dos, Tuloy ang Laban. He played Mr. Bernardo, a perfectionist teacher. He was recognized as New Movie Actor of the Year at the 36th Star Awards for Movies in 2021 by the Philippine Movie Press Club.

== Personal life ==
Marcoleta is married to Ana.

== Electoral history ==
Electoral history of Paolo Marcoleta
Year	Office	Party	Votes received				Result
Year	Office	Party	Total	%	P.	Swing	Result
2025	Representative (Party-list)	SAGIP	405,297	0.97%	26th	—N/a	Won
