= Rodante Marcoleta =

Senator of the Philippines since 2025

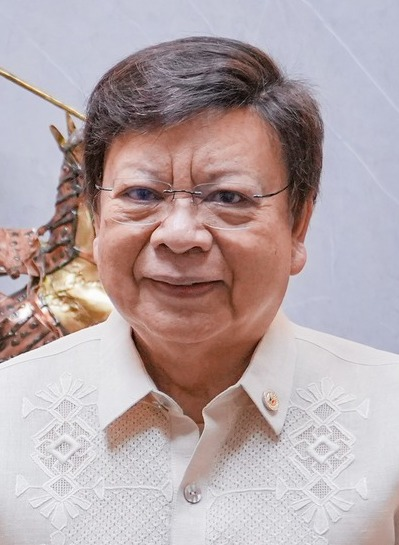
- Marcoleta in 2025

Senate Deputy Minority Leader
- In office September 9, 2025 – May 11, 2026 Serving with Joel Villanueva
- Leader: Alan Peter Cayetano
- Preceded by: Risa Hontiveros

Senate Deputy Majority Leader
- In office July 30, 2025 – September 8, 2025
- Leader: Joel Villanueva
- Preceded by: Mark Villar
- Succeeded by: Risa Hontiveros

Senator of the Philippines (suspended)
- Incumbent
- Assumed office June 30, 2025 (Note: Suspended since October 19, 2026.)
Committee positions
Chair of the Senate Public Services Committee
In office May 18, 2026 – June 3, 2026
Preceded by	Raffy Tulfo
Succeeded by	Raffy Tulfo
Chair of the Senate Justice and Human Rights Committee
In office May 20, 2026 – June 3, 2026
Preceded by	Francis Pangilinan
Succeeded by	Francis Pangilinan
Chair of the Senate Blue Ribbon Committee
In office July 29, 2025 – September 8, 2025
Preceded by	Pia Cayetano
Succeeded by	Panfilo Lacson
Chair of the Senate Trade, Commerce and Entrepreneurship Committee
In office July 29, 2025 – June 3, 2026
Preceded by	Alan Peter Cayetano
Succeeded by	Bam Aquino

Deputy Speaker of the House of Representatives of the Philippines
- In office July 29, 2019 – June 1, 2022 Serving with several others
- Speaker: Alan Peter Cayetano; Lord Allan Velasco

Member of the House of Representatives for SAGIP
- In office June 30, 2016 – June 30, 2025

Member of the House of Representatives for Alagad
- In office June 30, 2004 – June 30, 2013

Personal details
- Born: Rodante Dizon Marcoleta; July 29, 1953 (age 73) Paniqui, Tarlac, Philippines
- Party: Independent (since 2024)
- Other political affiliations: PDP (2021–2024); SAGIP (partylist; 2015–2025); Alagad (partylist; 2004–2013)
- Spouse: Edna Magbitang
- Children: 3, including Paolo
- Education: San Sebastian College-Recoletos (LL.B); University of the East (MBA); University of the Philippines Diliman (D.P.A)
- Occupation: Politician
- Profession: Lawyer
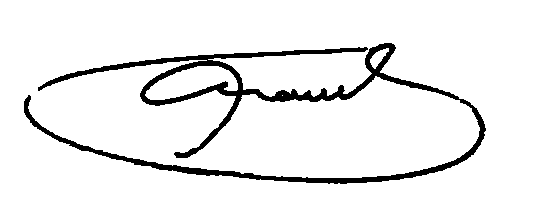
- Signature
- Criminal information
- Status: Incarcerated; awaiting trial
- Criminal charge: Plunder

Details
- Date apprehended: July 6, 2026
- Imprisoned at: New Quezon City Jail

Rodante Dizon Marcoleta (English: /mɑːrkəˈlɛtə/, Tagalog: [roˈdante maɾkɔˈlɛta]; born July 29, 1953) is a Filipino politician, lawyer, and television host who is a suspended senator of the Philippines since 2026. A former member of the Partido Demokratiko Pilipino, he served as the representative for the SAGIP Partylist from 2016 to 2025 and for the Alagad Party-list from 2004 to 2013. He is the first elected Philippine senator affiliated with the Iglesia ni Cristo.

During his tenure in the House of Representatives, Marcoleta chaired the Committee on Poverty Alleviation in 2009 and later the Special Committee on Globalization and WTO in 2018. He also chaired the Commission on Appointments Committee on Public Works and Highways and served as assistant majority leader of the Commission on Appointments before being removed from five committees. He served as senior deputy House majority leader from 2018 to 2019 and as a deputy speaker from 2019 to 2022.

Marcoleta was arrested on July 6, 2026, after the Sandiganbayan charged him with plunder for receiving ₱75 million in undeclared campaign donations as a congressman prior to the 2025 election campaign, and is currently awaiting trial. He was placed under a 90-day suspension by the Sandiganbayan on October 19, 2026.

== Early life and education ==
Rodante Marcoleta was born on July 29, 1953, in Paniqui, Tarlac. He graduated cum laude with a Bachelor of Arts degree in 1973. By 1989, he earned his law degree at San Sebastian College – Recoletos.

Marcoleta later obtained a master's degree in business administration at the University of the East and obtained a doctorate in public administration at the University of the Philippines Diliman in 2020. He also earned a developmental leadership certificate at Harvard Kennedy School.

== Pre-legal career ==
Marcoleta worked as a logistics supervisor at the Concrete Aggregates Corporation from 1975 to 1977, and as a research director at the Philippine Contractors Association from 1978 to 1980. At the Triumph Group of Companies, he served as an executive assistant for less than one year, and by 1982, he was given the position of deputy executive director at the International Federation of Asian and Western Pacific Contractors Associations (IFAWPCA), which he held until 2004.

In 1989, Marcoleta wrote an essay on the architecture of Iglesia Ni Cristo churches for the commemorative book titled 75 Blessed Years of the Iglesia Ni Cristo, 1914-1989.

== Legal career ==
In May 1992, Marcoleta filed a petition before the Supreme Court to halt the Media-Citizens Quick Count (MCQC) from further tabulating any more votes in the 1992 elections due to alleged violations in quick count procedures as set by the Commission on Elections.

== House of Representatives of the Philippines ==
=== Representing Alagad (2004–2013) ===
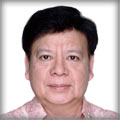
Portrait during the 15th Congress

Marcoleta was elected to the House of Representatives of the Philippines under the 13th Congress representing the partylist of Alagad from 2004 to 2007, which sought to represent the urban poor sector in Congress. Marcoleta was among the twelve new partylist congressmen who were already millionaires before being sworn in. He was later reelected under Alagad twice to the 15th and 16th Congress, serving from 2007 until 2013.

During his first term as congressman, Marcoleta was criticized for filing numerous bills and resolutions that were unrelated to issues concerning the urban poor, and was considered one of the leading proponents for family planning in the House of Representatives. In June 2005, Marcoleta endorsed the first impeachment complaint against President Gloria Macapagal Arroyo filed by lawyer Oliver Lozano for "betrayal of public trust" in the aftermath of the Hello Garci scandal. Although he was elected as an administration-allied congressman, Marcoleta explained that his intent was find out how truthful the electoral fraud allegations against the president were, and the decision to endorse was not influenced by the Iglesia ni Cristo. Minority Leader Francis Escudero criticized Marcoleta's decision due to it initiating a one-year-ban on filing for another impeachment, voicing his belief that the complaint was merely for show in order to prevent the opposition from filing its own impeachment complaint against president Arroyo.

In late 2004, Marcoleta was subject to an internal dispute inside Alagad, in which the founding president Diogenes Osabel, who Marcoleta succeeded as Alagad representative in the 2004 elections, attempted to oust Marcoleta for "loss of trust and confidence", and was given a deadline to resign at January 7, 2005. Marcoleta refused to heed the resignation order and insisted that then House Speaker Jose de Venecia Jr. would not honor the other faction's standing request to administer the oath of office to the Osabel faction.

On March 28, 2006, Marcoleta wrote an op-ed for the Philippine Daily Inquirer in which he questioned the actions of ABS-CBN (producer of Wowowee), who he alleged was "undermining the findings of the Department of Justice committee which investigated the PhilSports Arena stampede" for "prematurely questioning the impartiality of the National Bureau of Investigation", years before he voted and advocated for the shutdown of ABS-CBN broadcasting 14 years later in 2020.

In March 2013, President Benigno Aquino III vetoed a bill sponsored by Marcoleta with Luzviminda Ilagan that establishes a Magna Carta for the Poor, explaining that it was unrealistic due to a lack of government funds. The bill used was the Senate version that replaced Marcoleta's own House bill filed since his first term in Congress, and placed blame for the veto on Senator Kiko Pangilinan for insisting on using the Senate's version of the bill.

In September 2014, the Commission on Audit (COA) reported that Marcoleta channeled ₱15 million of pork barrel funds to dubious NGOs during his term in Congress as Alagad party-list representative, as part of the pork barrel scam involving Janet Lim-Napoles. In 2016, the COA's pork barrel investigation included Marcoleta on its list of lawmakers whose pork barrel funds were allotted to dubious NGOs from 2007 to 2009.

=== Representing SAGIP (2016–2025) ===
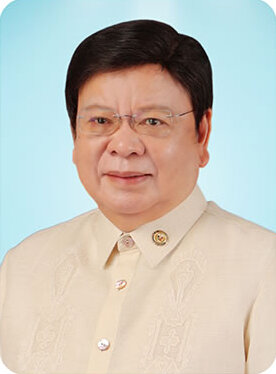
Portrait during the 19th Congress

In 2016, under the 17th Congress, he was elected party-list representative of the Social Amelioration and Genuine Intervention on Poverty, more commonly known by its abbreviation SAGIP. He is known as the proponent of slashing the budget of the Commission on Human Rights to ₱1,000 (equivalent to ₱1,155 in 2021). Marcoleta was a co-author of the House bill that was later consolidated with the Senate bill of Leila de Lima and Antonio Trillanes to become the landmark law Magna Carta of the Poor, which was signed by President Rodrigo Duterte in April 2019.

During the 18th Congress, he served as a house deputy speaker.

One of the vocal detractors against ABS-CBN, Marcoleta is one of the 70 representatives who voted to permanently deny the renewal of the network's franchise and is responsible for the termination of the landmark partnership deal between ABS-CBN and TV5.

On September 18, 2024, Marcoleta was removed as vice chairperson (and effectively as a member) of the House Committee on Good Government and Public Accountability and replaced by representative Janette Garin of Iloilo's 1st district. A week later on September 25, Marcoleta was unanimously expelled from five further committees (Constitutional Amendments, Public Accounts, Energy, Justice and the Commission on Appointments) by the House of Representatives and replaced by Manila Teachers Party-list representative Virgilio Lacson. Although no explanation was given, his removal from the committees came after his actions opposing the House committees' investigations into Vice President Sara Duterte's fund utilization.

During a House inquiry on disinformation in 2025, Marcoleta falsely claimed that "there was no West Philippine Sea", that it is only a designation "created by us" and does not appear in maps. He was fact-checked for this claim. A few days thereafter, he backpedaled as his remark drew flak. He clarified that the label does not appear in international maps and that the sea is the Philippines' regardless of the name.

==== Ivermectin pantry ====
In April 2021, during the COVID-19 pandemic in the Philippines, Marcoleta and Anakalusugan party-list representative Mike Defensor initiated an "ivermectin pan-three" that distributes the anti-parasitic drug ivermectin, despite warnings from the World Health Organization on the lack of evidence to support the drug's efficacy against COVID-19.

== Senate of the Philippines (since 2025) ==
=== Elections ===
==== 2022 withdrawn election bid ====
In September 2021, Marcoleta was nominated by the PDP–Laban political party to run for senator in the 2022 Philippine Senate elections. On April 27, 2022, 12 days prior to the elections, Marcoleta withdrew his senatorial bid, citing his 'poor showing' in the surveys.

==== 2025 Senate election ====
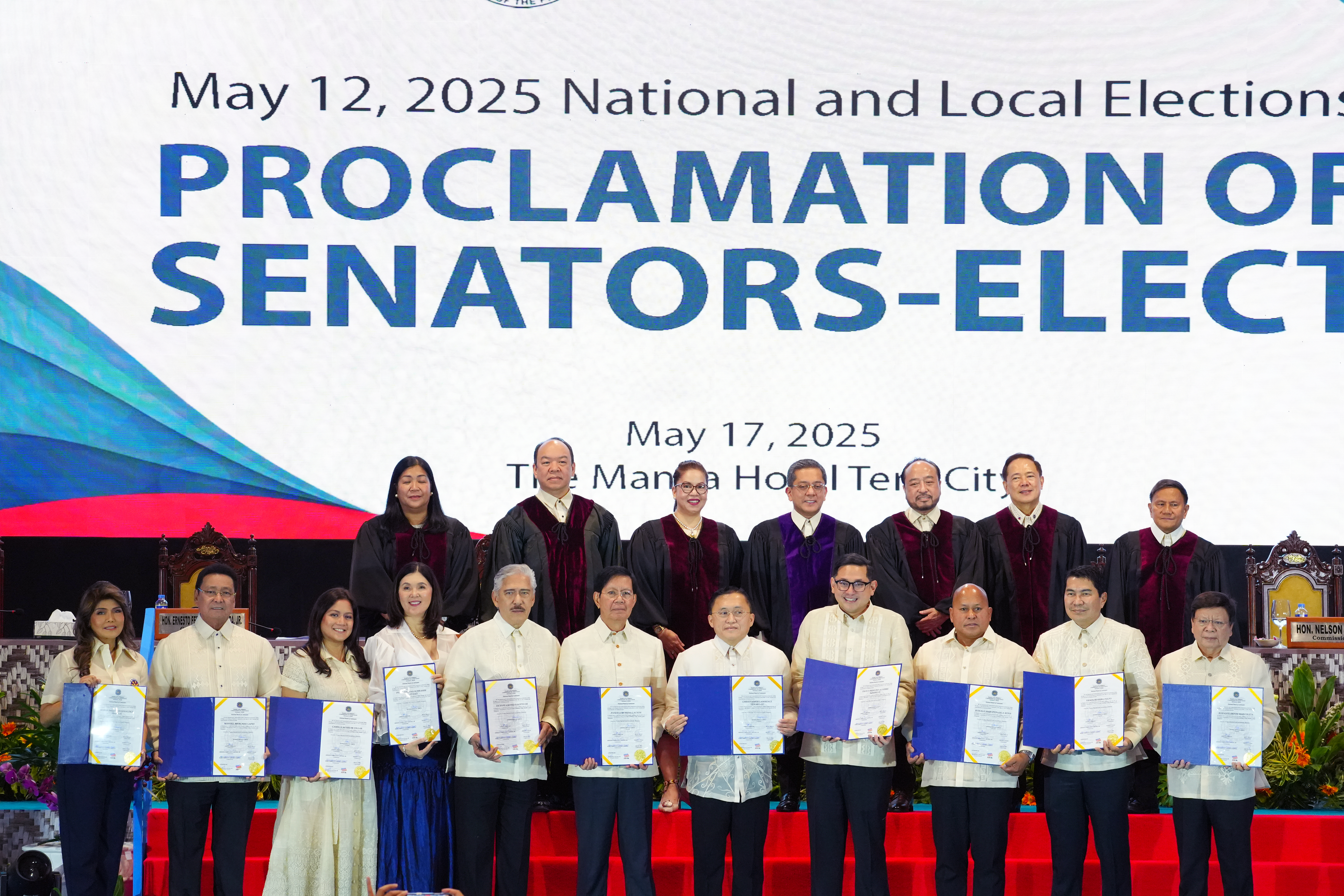
Marcoleta (5th from right) during the proclamation of senators at the Manila Hotel Forum in 2025.

On October 8, 2024, Marcoleta filed his candidacy for the 2025 Philippine Senate election as an independent candidate, and was one of the candidates of the DuterTen senatorial slate. He along seven other candidates received formal endorsement from his church, the Iglesia ni Cristo in May 2025 days prior to the election.

Despite consistently placing outside the top twelve in surveys in the lead up to the election, Marcoleta was elected as a senator, placing sixth with more than 15 million votes.

=== Tenure ===
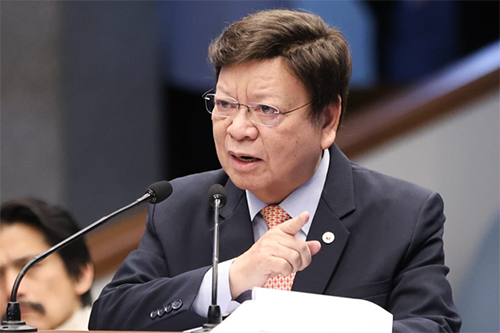
Senator Marcoleta explaining his "yes" vote to archive the articles of impeachment against Vice President Sara Duterte on August 6, 2025

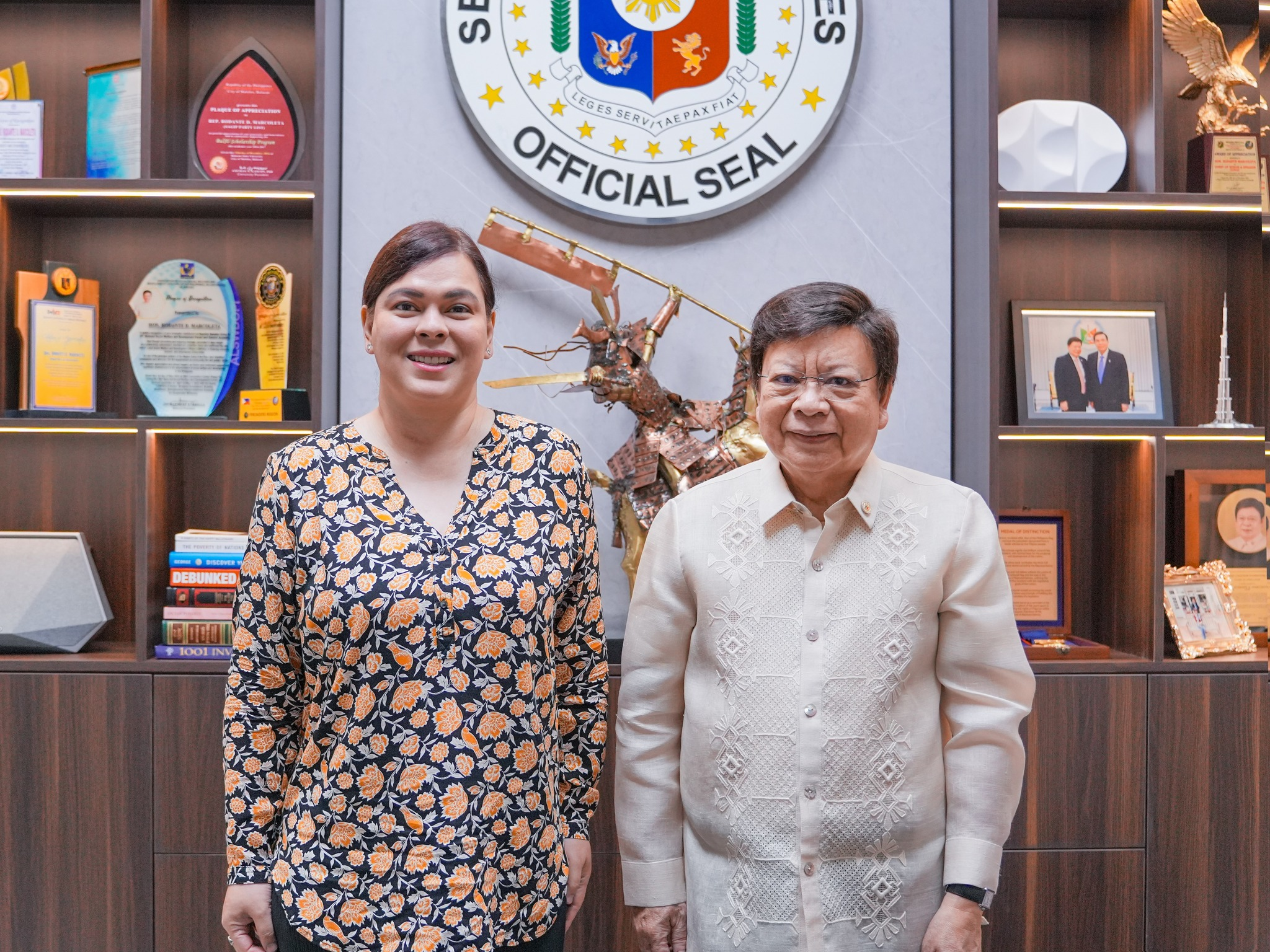
Vice President Sara Duterte (left) and Marcoleta (right) on September 17, 2025

Marcoleta assumed office as senator on June 30, 2025. In the following month, shortly after the opening of the 20th Congress, he was named as a Senate deputy majority floor leader and the chairman of the Senate Blue Ribbon Committee. As head of the Blue Ribbon Committee, Marcoleta led an investigation into the flood control projects controversy in the Philippines, where public funds were allegedly funneled to substandard and ghost projects to benefit a handful of favored contractors and government officials.

He served in both capacities until September 8, 2025, when Senator Tito Sotto became the Senate President, replacing Senator Francis Escudero. On September 9, Marcoleta was named as a Senate deputy minority floor leader, alongside Senator Joel Villanueva.

Following a Senate leadership coup on May 11, 2026, Marcoleta voted to elect Alan Peter Cayetano as Senate President in the Senate President election. As a result, he relinquished his position as Deputy Minority Floor Leader and joined the majority bloc. Following the shakeup, he was named the new chairperson of the committees on Public Services and Justice and Human Rights.

== Controversies ==
=== Campaign funds controversy ===
Prior to filing his senatorial candidacy in the 2025 elections on October 8, 2024, Marcoleta received campaign donations from congressman Mike Defensor, construction magnate Aristotle Viray and businessman Joseph V. Espiritu amounting to ₱75 million. Marcoleta claimed to have decided against declaring the donations in his statement of contributions and expenditures (SOCE) out of respect for his donors' desired anonymity. In December 2025, election watchdog Kontra Daya and the Advocates of Public Interest Law filed a perjury complaint against Marcoleta before the Ombudsman, for failing to disclose the campaign donations he received. The Office of the Deputy Ombudsman's field investigation bureau for Luzon in May 2026 later filed plunder and indirect bribery complaints against Marcoleta and three of his 2025 senatorial campaign donors including Mike Defensor. The complaint alleged that in January 2025, Marcoleta received a combined total of ₱75 million from the donors—surpassing the ₱50 million statutory threshold for plunder.

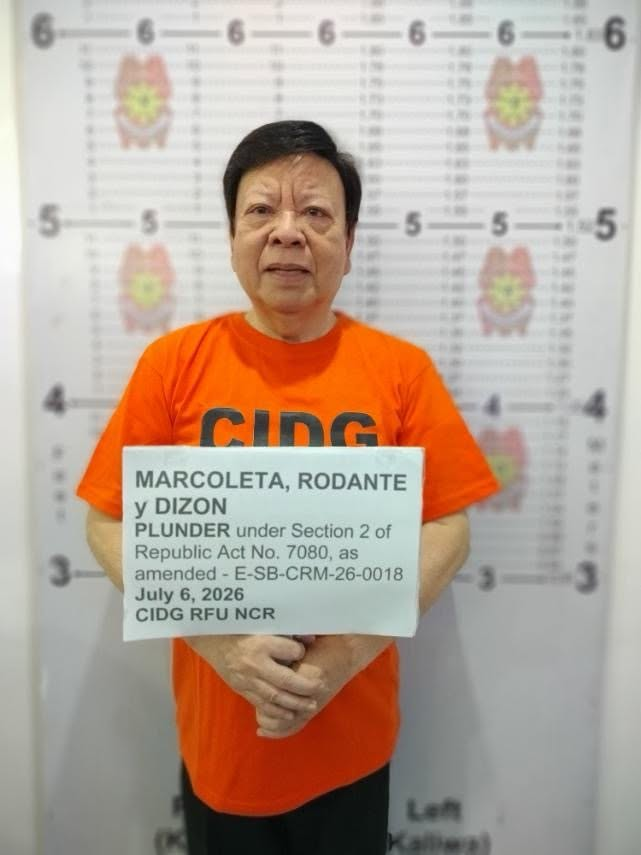
Mug shot of Marcoleta after his arrest by the Philippine National Police on July 6, 2026.

After the arrest warrant against Marcoleta and his peers were made public in July 7, Marcoleta tried to block the arrest by going to the Sandiganbayan. However, his legal remedies were denied, which led him to be arrested on the spot. Moments after being arrested, Marcoleta claimed he has chest pains and need to be transferred to an air-conditioned hospital room.

It was later claimed that he also has mild pneumonia, degenerative disc disease, hypertension, and, later, even high cholesterol. Because of his alleged sudden health conditions, it was recommended by the officers of the PNP Hospital that Marcoleta was not yet fit for travel, which allegedly prevents him from attending trial. Prior to the arrest, he attended a rally and vocally criticized future attempts to arrest him, while standing in good health in front of Iglesia ni Cristo members.

After being diagnosed with sudden and alleged medical conditions after his arrest, he was visited by vice president Sara Duterte, who did not show up to her own trial. The visit was questioned by Sandigan justices, who questioned why the visit was allowed when Marcoleta allegedly has pneumonia.

The Sandiganbayan afterwards ordered an independent Philippine General Hospital (PGH) medical exam to determine the accurate medical condition of Marcoleta. Alarmed by the court order, PNP Hospital officers released a statement saying Marcoleta is now medically fit to travel but would still allegedly need time to finish taking all his antibiotics. The following day, Marcoleta was transported to the PGH for a thorough and independent health check-up. He arrived on a wheelchair, which was criticized by many as a stunt similar to what former President Gloria Macapagal Arroyo did when she was arrested in November 2011. The PGH found that Marcoleta actually has no traces of pneumonia or any diseases and sicknesses that may hinder his appearance in court. The independent medical result noted that "there is no finding or medical condition to require further hospitalization." After the PGH medical report was released, Marcoleta, who entered the hospital on a wheelchair, was seen exiting the area brisk walking, disproving any physical disability he claimed before.

The PNP afterwards retracted their previous statements, and said Marcoleta is now fit to stand trial. He was afterwards sent to the New Quezon City Jail. The counsel of Marcoleta afterwards questioned the conditions and congestion level of the jail, but jail officials debunked the counsel's claims, stating that the jail where Marcoleta was sent actually has a negative congestion rate, meaning there is no congestion within its facilities. The BJMP earlier said there won’t be special treatment for the senator. The Sandiganbayan placed Marcoleta under a 90-day preventive suspension on October 19, 2026.

=== Pro-China position ===
Marcoleta, who has held private talks with China's ambassador, has been known as a vocal opponent of the Philippine national government's position on the West Philippine Sea. In numerous occasions, he has echoed the talking points of China against the national interests of the Philippines, leading some to believe he may be a Manchurian candidate.

Marcoleta has criticized Philippine Coast Guard spokesperson Jay Tarriela in January 2026 after the latter previously delivered a presentation which included satirical images of Chinese president Xi Jinping. He also criticized the government's transparency initiative and suggested the Philippines could be an ally of China if the South China Sea dispute is resolved. Marcoleta has also downplayed the territorial claims of the Philippines in the halls of the Senate. His statements of support towards China has garnered widespread criticism and rebuttals from fellow senators and the general public. Various groups have branded Marcoleta as a Tsinador, or a Chinese senator.

=== Connection with the Discaya family ===
During the flood control controversy, Marcoleta, in his capacity as committee chair and later as member after he was ousted, was accused by Senator Panfilo Lacson and others of protecting Curlee and Sarah Discaya, two of the major actors in the flood control scandal where billions of pesos were stolen beginning in the administration of former president Rodrigo Duterte. Marcoleta has pushed several times for the Discaya couple to be included in the witness protection program, which would shield the couple from legal prosecution. He has also stated that the Discayas do not need to return the billions of pesos they stole from public funds to become state witnesses. Because of these incidents, Lacson questioned the motives of Marcoleta regarding the flood control issues and the Discaya couple. It was later revealed the insurance provider of the Discaya couple's flood control businesses was Stronghold Insurance Corp, where its director was Edna Marcoleta, the wife of senator Marcoleta. After the Blue Ribbon Committee under Lacson provided copies of the official Senate flood control report, Marcoleta and his allies in the Senate refused to sign it since some of their political allies were named in the report, preventing the continuation of the flood control investigations.

== Personal life ==
Marcoleta is married to Edna Magbitang of Anao, Tarlac. The couple has three children, including incumbent SAGIP Party-list Representative Paolo Marcoleta. Magbitang is an independent director of Stronghold Insurance Co. Inc. since February 2024.

Marcoleta is a member of the Iglesia ni Cristo and his former partylist Alagad is noted for its association with the religion. He is also the host of Net 25 public affairs program Sa Ganang Mamamayan (lit. For Citizens) and public service program Sagip Barangay ng Mamamayan in Action.

== Electoral history ==
Electoral history of Rodante Marcoleta
Year	Office	Party	Votes received				Result
Year	Office	Party	Total	%	P.	Swing	Result
2004	Representative (Party-list)	Alagad	340,977	2.68%	11th	—N/a	Won
2007	Representative (Party-list)	Alagad	423,165	2.64%	8th	−0.04	Won
2010	Representative (Party-list)	Alagad	227,281	0.76%	36th	−1.88	Won
2016	Representative (Party-list)	SAGIP	397,064	1.23%	27th	—N/a	Won
2019	Representative (Party-list)	SAGIP	257,313	0.92%	32nd	−0.31	Won
2022	Representative (Party-list)	SAGIP	780,456	2.14%	6th	+1.20	Won
2022	Senator of the Philippines	PDP	3,591,899	6.63%	31st	—N/a	Withdrawn
2025	Senator of the Philippines	Independent	15,250,723	26.59%	6th	+19.96	Won
