= Alagad Party-list =

Political party in the Philippines

Alagad
- — Philippine partylist —
- Full name: Alagad Party-List
- Sector(s) represented: Urban poor
- Founder: Diogenes Osabel
- Founded: November 14, 1997; 28 years ago
- Delisted: 2021

Website
- www.alagad.org.ph (archived)

Alagad was a party-list in the Philippines closely linked with the religious group, Iglesia Ni Cristo which was founded on November 14, 1997, by Diogenes Osabel, an advocate for the urban poor's rights and welfare. The party was originally constituted by a group of urban poor leaders in the National Capital Region (NCR) led by Elymer de Guzman. Its initial base included the cities of Baguio, Cebu, Davao, Cagayan de Oro, and Zamboanga City, and the provinces of Pangasinan, Pampanga, Tarlac, Bulacan, and Cavite.

"Alagad" means "Disciple" or "Follower" in the Filipino language.

The Commission on Elections cancelled the registration of Alagad as a partylist organization in 2021 for failing to participate in the last two elections.

== Electoral performance ==
Election year	Votes	%	Seats
1998	312,500	3.41%	1
2001	117,161	0.77%	0
2004	340,977	2.68%	1
2007	423,165	2.64%	2
2010	227,281	0.75%	1
2013	27,348	0.10%	0

== Representatives to Congress ==
Period	1st Representative	2nd Representative	3rd Representative
11th Congress; 1998–2001	Dioegenes Osabel	—N/a	—N/a
12th Congress; 2001–2004	Out of Congress		
13th Congress; 2004–2007	Rodante Marcoleta	—N/a	—N/a
14th Congress; 2007–2010	Dioegenes Osabel	Rodante Marcoleta	—N/a
15th Congress; 2010–2013	Rodante Marcoleta	—N/a	—N/a
16th Congress; 2013–2016	Out of Congress		
