= Lili Marlene (aircraft) =

1947 air crash in Lanao, Philippines

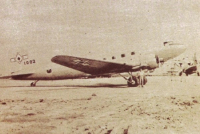
- 1002, the aircraft involved, seen on its delivery to the Philippines in 1946.

Accident
- Date: May 18, 1947
- Summary: Controlled Flight into Terrain
- Site: Mount Makaturing, Lanao; 7°39′N 124°19′E

Aircraft
- Aircraft type: Douglas C-47 Skytrain
- Aircraft name: Lili Marlene
- Operator: Philippine Army Air Corps
- Registration: 1002
- Flight origin: Rajah Buayan Air Base, General Santos, South Cotabato
- Stopover: Dansalan Airfield, Dansalan, Lanao
- Destination: Bacolod City Domestic Airport, Bacolod, Negros Occidental
- Occupants: 17 (confirmed)
- Fatalities: 17 (confirmed)
- Survivors: 0

The Lili Marlene, also known as the Lily Marline, was a Douglas C-47 Skytrain that crashed at Mount Makaturing, near Dansalan, Lanao, Philippines. All 17 people on board were killed. Among those on board, were high-ranking Philippine Government Officials, including Colonel Edwin Andrews, Chief of Staff of the Philippine Army Air Corps (PAAC, later Philippine Air Force) and the Board of Directors of the National Land Settlement Administration (NSLA) (now known as the Department of Agrarian Reform), including the Chairman of the NSLA and President of the Philippine Sugar Association, Rafael Alunan Sr. This was the first recorded air accident of the Philippine Air Force.

== Aircraft ==
The Douglas C-47 Skytrain Lili Marlene was delivered to the Philippines as a result of the Treaty of Manila, and on the day of Philippine Independence, the Lili Marlene was delivered to the Philippines, in Manila. The equipment the United States gave to the Philippines was "Sorely needed" as the Philippine Government, at the time was attempting to suppress communist movements in the Philippines.

== Incident ==
On May 18, 1947, the C-47 was scheduled to fly a route from South Cotabato (Buayan Air Base) to Bacolod via Dansalan, with Rafael Alunan Sr. (NLSA), Francisco Zulueta (NSLA), Alfredo Paredes (NSLA) and 4 other NSLA staff, Colonel Edwin Andrews and Officers and Soldiers of the Philippine Army Air Corps.

However, mid-way through the first leg of the trip, the plane had been guided into the direct flight path of Mount Makaturing in Lanao, near Dansalan, at around 5300 feet. However, no one noticed that the plane had crashed until 96 hours after the plane's expected time of arrival in Bacolod.

On May 22, 1947, the public was informed that the C-47 failed to arrive at Bacolod after 96 hours, President Manuel Roxas hosted a search party in an attempt to recover the plane and fate of the people on board, headed by Major General Rafael Jalandoni. The Search Party was tasked with carrying out maritime and aerial reconnaissance over Visayas and Mindanao in an attempt to recover the plane.

== Search ==
On the same day of the search, a plane wreckage emerged on a mountain in Bukidnon. In which the search party concluded that no one survived the accident. However, it was later then confirmed that this was not the case, as the plane was a C-47, but not the Lili Marlene

As a result, another search party was sent out to find the Lili Marlene. This included both maritime and air searches.

On May 26, 1947, a plane was suspected to be found, now on Mount Makaturing, which was investigated by the search party.

On May 29, 1947, it was confirmed that the plane was the Lili Marlene, and 17 bodies were recovered, including Rafael Alunan Sr. and Colonel Edwin Andrews, which thus ended the search, and began the process of Investigation.

== Investigation ==
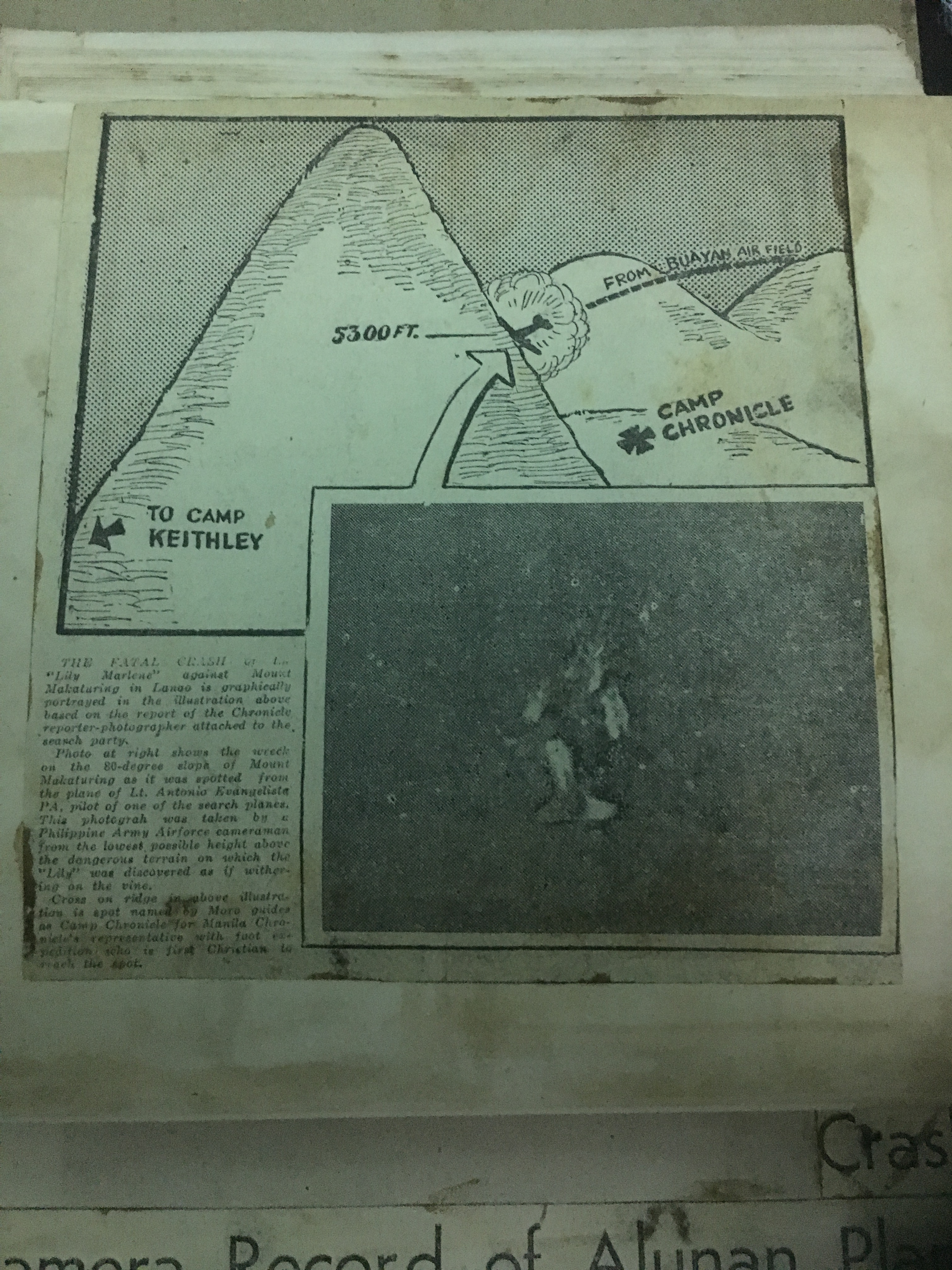
An Article showing the last moments of the Plane towards its crash, and an Aerial Photo of the wreckage of the plane.

On the evening of May 29, 1947, a statement by Major General Rafael Jalandoni to Malacañang concluded that the aircraft underwent a controlled flight into terrain.

However, there were also some suspicions that there may have been more passengers loaded than the original 17, in which Jalandoni explains that "Some of the passengers may have been disintegrated" as well as the grounds that there were "women's clothing and other articles among the debris." He also states that "Not a body was found whole." He also stated that "Some of the Passengers may have Disintegrated in the Intense Heat", which led to an overall conclusion that the plane was overweight, therefore the plane may have been controlled into terrain, with it being impossible to pull up or avoid the mountain.

However, a week later on June 5, 1947, members of the Macaso Party near Mount Makaturing found body parts and parts of a plane on the slopes of Mount Seriban. This then raised speculation on whether the plane had "exploded in mid-air due to undetermined causes".

== Aftermath ==
After the search, the remains of those on board the Lili Marlene were transported back to Manila on May 31, 1947. This then led to the State Funeral, held by President Manuel Roxas, honouring the men aboard the Lili Marlene, such as the men who were part of the Alunan Party (NSLA) (Including Rafael Alunan Sr.), the Chief of Staff of the PAAC, Colonel Edwin Andrews and Judge Francisco Zulueta.

On December 6, 1956, The Philippine Government which retained control of a former American airfield in Zamboanga, renamed it after Colonel Edwin Andrews. Today, Edwin Andrews Air base is still in service, with it being partially joined with Zamboanga International Airport.

Rafael Alunan Sr. was the grandfather of Rafael Alunan III, who grew up to become the Secretary of Tourism under the Administration of Former President Corazon Aquino.

Francisco Zulueta's brother, Jose Zulueta later became a Senator of the Philippines in 1953 and the Governor of Iloilo.

== See also ==
- List of accidents and incidents involving Philippine Air Force aircraft
- List of accidents and incidents involving the DC-3
- List of accidents and incidents involving the DC-3 in 1947
- Treaty of Manila (1946)
- Lili Marleen
