= List of accidents and incidents involving Philippine Air Force aircraft =

This is a list of accidents and incidents involving aircraft of the Philippine Air Force.

== Before 2000 ==
=== 1947 ===
- May 18: The Lili Marlene, a Douglas C-47 Skytrain crashed in Mount Makaturing near Dansalan, Lanao, killing Col. Edwin Andrews, head of the Philippine Army Air Corps (PAAC, later the Philippine Air Force) and 17 others on board, including government officials.

=== 1948 ===
- February 24: A Douglas C-47 crashed after take-off during a test flight at Fernando Air Base in Lipa, Batangas, killing three out of six people on board.

=== 1957 ===
- March 17 - 1957 Cebu Douglas C-47 crash - Mount Pinatubo, a Douglas C-47 carrying President Ramon Magsaysay, Education Secretary Gregorio Hernandez Jr., former Senator Tomas Cabili, Congressman Pedro Lopez and Philippine Air Force Commanding General Benito Ebuen to Manila from a visit to Cebu, crashed into Mount Manunggal in Balamban, Cebu killing 25 of the 26 people on board. The only survivor was journalist Nestor Mata.

=== 1965 ===
- July 25: A Douglas C-47 crashed near Libacao, Aklan, killing all 36 on board.

=== 1968 ===
- November 7: A Douglas C-47 crashed into a mountain in Zambales, killing all 11 on board.

=== 1971 ===
- April 15: A Douglas C-47A stalled and crashed into a rice field near Floridablanca Air Base, Pampanga, killing all 40 on board.
- November 8: A helicopter conducting reconnaissance operations against the New People's Army was shot down over San Mariano, Isabela, killing Colonel Melchor dela Cruz, Commander of the Philippine Army's 10th Infantry Battalion.

=== 1972 ===
- December 26: A Douglas C-47A crashed in Tongkil, Sulu after being shot down by MNLF rebels.

=== 1974 ===
- January 11: An F-86F Sabre piloted by Maj. Antonio Bautista of the 9th Tactical Fighter Squadron was severely damaged by MNLF rebels and crashed in Jolo, Sulu. He ejected from his plane but drifted behind enemy lines and was killed-in-action the same day.

=== 1978 ===
- September 14: A Fokker F27 Friendship 200 crashed into a fishpond on approach to Nichols Air Base in Parañaque, killing 17. Most of the victims were aides and reporters covering President Ferdinand Marcos.

=== 1979 ===
- March 2: A Vought F-8H Crusader (serial number 147906, modex 300) crashed on takeoff from Basa Air Base in Pampanga after the left wing folded. The pilot, LtCol. Orlando Avila, was killed.

=== 1982 ===
- March 17: A BN-2A-21 Islander crashed under unspecified circumstances.

=== 1983 ===
- March 16: A Vought F-8H Crusader (serial number 147047, modex 323) crashed into the sea while experiencing electrical problems on final approach into Puerto Princesa International Airport. The body of the pilot, Maj. Phil Bacolod, was never recovered.

=== 1984 ===
- July 11: A Bell UH-1 "Huey" helicopter crashed in Buenavista (province unnamed).

=== 1985 ===
- November 20: A helicopter crashed into the Iloilo Strait during a heavy rainstorm, killing Col. Arturo Licup, the deputy AFP commander for Western Visayas and four other officers.

=== 1986 ===
- August 15: An F-5 fighter jet crashed into a house in Angeles, Pampanga, killing the pilot and three people on the ground.

=== 1987 ===
- January 10: A BN-2A-21 Islander crashed off Pilas island in Hadji Muhtamad, Basilan following engine problems. Three occupants were rescued while the remaining nine on board died.
- May 30: A Sikorsky S-76 helicopter on loan for a filming of Chuck Norris' Missing in Action II crashed in Manila Bay, killing four soldiers and injuring five.

=== 1988 ===
- December 19: A Fokker F27 Friendship 200MAR carrying Defense Secretary Fidel Ramos crash-landed in bad weather before bursting into flames at Catarman Airport in Northern Samar. All 15 on board managed to escape, although the pilot was slightly injured.
- December 20: A helicopter dispatched from Tacloban, Leyte to fetch Ramos and his party in Catarman developed engine trouble and crashed into the sea, injuring two of its crewmembers.

=== 1989 ===
- April 1: A Fokker F27 Friendship 200MAR overshot the runway at Laoag Airport in Ilocos Norte and came to rest partly submerged into the sea.
- December 1: An F-5 fighter jet participating in sorties against RAM positions during the 1989 Philippine coup attempt crashed in unclear circumstances near Sangley Air Base in Cavite, killing its pilot, Major Danilo Atienza, who was posthumously awarded by President Corazon C. Aquino with the Medal of Valor and to whom the base was subsequently renamed after.

=== 1990 ===
- October 5: A T-28 trainer aircraft participating in military operations against rebels during the 1990 Mindanao revolt developed engine failure and crashed in Cebu, killing the pilot.

=== 1991 ===
- August 28: A BN-2A-21 Islander crashed in Romblon, Romblon, killing 10.

=== 1992 ===
- December 18: A BN-2A-21 Islander ditched near Zamboanga. All four on board survived.

=== 1993 ===
- December 15: A Lockheed C-130H Hercules crashed in Libmanan, Camarines Sur, killing 30.
- December 17: An SIAI-Marchetti SF.260 trainer aircraft crashed into a coconut grove near Fernando Air Base in Lipa, Batangas, killing all two on board.
- December 28: A GAF Nomad N.22B crashed in Margosatubig, Zamboanga del Sur.

=== 1997 ===
- A Fokker F27 crashed at Lubang Airport, Occidental Mindoro.

== 2000-present ==
=== 2000 ===
- July 2: A GAF Nomad N-22 C crashed off the coast of Cagayancillo, Palawan, killing Palawan Governor Salvador Socrates, AFP Western Command Commanding General Major General Santiago Madrid and 12 others. An American national was the only survivor.

=== 2001 ===
- March 26: An OV-10 Bronco developed engine failure and crashed into a residential area in Mabalacat, Pampanga, killing the pilot, Captain Mary Grace Baloyo, who ordered her copilot to eject and then steered the plane into an empty lot. She posthumously became the first female member of the Armed Forces of the Philippines to receive the Medal of Valor.
- April 13: A Bell 250 helicopter carrying staff members of President Gloria Macapagal-Arroyo plunged amid zero visibility into the Cordillera mountains in Bokod, Benguet. Despite the helicopter being a total wreck, all 11 on board survived.
- May 18: A Sikorsky-47 helicopter carrying six bodies from the site of an earlier helicopter crash went down in Puerto Princesa, Palawan, killing seven.
- August 14: Two pilots and four crew members survived the crash of a Huey during a test flight on the runway of Francisco Bangoy International Airport.

=== 2002 ===
- January 14: An S-211 trainer jet crashed into a row of houses in Cabanatuan, Nueva Ecija, killing the two pilots and three people on the ground.
- May 2: A Northrop F-5A Freddom Fighter (serial number 67-21176) crashed during war games into an empty school in Mabalacat, Pampanga, killing the pilot.
- October 5: An SF-260 Marchetti reconnaissance-bomber crashed off Little Santa Cruz Island in Zamboanga City. Both pilots ejected and were rescued.
- December 12: Two pilots and a civilian on the ground were killed after an SF-260 trainer plane crashed into the roof of a computer parts factory in Santo Tomas, Batangas.
- December 17: A GAF Nomad N.22B crashed off the coast of Zamboanga City with no casualties.

=== 2003 ===
- January 21: Three crewmen and four TV journalists were injured after their Huey spun out of control after being buffeted by strong winds and crash-landed on a mountain slope outside San Jose, Nueva Ecija.
- August 3: Four airmen and five other unidentified passengers of a Huey were injured after it crashed in Mount Salacot in Puerto Princesa due to strong winds.
- November 29: An OV-10 Bronco malfunctioned and crashed off Nasugbu, Batangas. Both pilots parachuted to safety.

=== 2004 ===
- January 9: A Huey suddenly went into an uncontrollable rotation during a simulated emergency landing on a vacant lot in a reclamation site in Cebu City and crashed. All four people on board survived.

=== 2005 ===
- April 28: Former PHIVOLCS Director and Philippine National Red Cross governor Raymundo Punongbayan and eight others died in the crash of a Huey in Gabaldon, Nueva Ecija.
- May 24: A Cessna Training Plane T-41D crashed at Loakan Airport in Baguio, killing four.
- June 23: A pilot and six members of the Presidential Security Group (PSG) were injured after a helicopter carrying them crashed as it was maneuvering to land on an airstrip in Rosales, Pangasinan.

=== 2006 ===
- January 24: An OV-10 Bronco bomber encountered engine and mechanical trouble and crashed into a fishpond in Paombong, Bulacan, killing the pilot, who ordered his copilot to eject and steered the plane away from a populated area.
- April 24: An 520MG helicopter encountered problems and was forced to crash-land into a sparsely vegetated mountain slope in San Ildefonso, Bulacan. All three people on board survived.
- October 24: An OV-10 had its right landing gear collapse while landing at Diosdado Macapagal International Airport in Pampanga after war games, causing the aircraft to swerve to the right and injuring its two pilots.
- December 28: An MG-520 helicopter crashed while landing at Zamboanga International Airport after a routine maintenance flight, injuring its two pilots.

=== 2007 ===
- April 28: A Huey crashed into a residential area and crushed two tricycles in Lapu-Lapu, Cebu, killing two crew members and seven civilians on the ground.
- August 18: An MG-520 helicopter crashed at sea during counterinsurgency operations in Ungkaya Pukan, Basilan, killing a pilot.

=== 2008 ===
- January 27: A Huey hit trees and rolled down a slope as it crash-landed in Balamban, Cebu. All nine on board survived.
- August 25: A C130 Hercules crashed into Davao Gulf after takeoff from Francisco Bangoy International Airport, killing all nine on board.
- November 17: A helicopter crashed during a training flight at Basa Air Base in Floridablanca, Pampanga. The two pilots survived.

=== 2009 ===
- April 7: A Bell 412 helicopter carrying senior staff members of President Gloria Macapagal-Arroyo crashed in the Cordillera mountains in Tinoc, Ifugao, killing all eight on board.

=== 2010 ===
- January 4: An OV-10 Bronco attack aircraft crash-landed into the main runway of Francisco Bangoy International Airport after it developed engine trouble following a routine maintenance flight. The pilot was unharmed.
- January 28: A GAF Nomad crashed into a residential area in Cotabato City, killing all eight on board and one on the ground. Among the passengers was Maj. Gen. Mario 'Butch' Lacson, commander of the PAF's 3rd Air Division in Zamboanga City.
- February 24: An OV-10 Bronco crashed at Crow Valley Gunnery Range in Capas, Tarlac, killing all two on board.
- July 19: An AS-211 training aircraft crashed in a sugarcane field in Concepcion, Tarlac. Its two pilots managed to eject and land safely.

=== 2011 ===
- April 13: A Huey suddenly lost power and went down on a hard landing during a training flight in Taytay, Rizal. Two pilots and three crewmembers were injured.
- April 28: An AS-211 jet aircraft crashed while undergoing a routine proficiency flight off the coast of Bagac, Bataan, killing two pilots on board.
- October 1: A Huey crashed during a resupply mission in Patikul, Sulu, killing three soldiers and wounding another.
- November 9: An OV-10 crashed inside Edwin Andrews Air Base in Zamboanga City, injuring the two pilots.

=== 2012 ===
- March 11: A Huey delivering supplies crashed in Kitcharao, Agusan del Norte, injuring seven.
- May 18: An SF-260TP trainer aircraft crashed off Mariveles, Bataan while conducting a proficiency flight, killing the two pilots.

=== 2013 ===
- June 23: An OV-10 Bronco crashed during a night flying proficiency flight off the coast of Puerto Princesa, killing all two on board.
- December 6: A Huey crashed during relief operations between Burauen and La Paz, Leyte. All eight on board survived.

=== 2014 ===
- August 7: A Sokol helicopter crashed inside Camp Ranao in Marawi, Lanao del Sur, injuring a passenger and one person on the ground. The passengers on board included 4th Infantry Division commanding general Major General Ricardo Visaya and other government officials.

=== 2015 ===
- January 31: Two pilots were killed when an SF260 trainer aircraft crashed off the coast of Nasugbu, Batangas.
- February 4: One person was injured when a Huey rolled over and crashed during takeoff at Camp Evangelista in Cagayan de Oro.
- May 11: The front landing gear of a Fokker 27 detached upon landing at Legazpi Airport in Albay. There were no injuries.
- November 7: A Huey on a casualty evacuation mission crash landed in Malapatan, Sarangani The 9 passengers on board suffered slight injuries.

=== 2016 ===
- November 8: A Sokol helicopter with 13 passengers on board “experienced a mechanical problem and crash landed” during a reconnaissance flight in Puerto Princesa. Four people, including Chief Superintendent Wilben Mayor, police director for the Mimaropa region, suffered minor injuries.

=== 2017 ===
- May 4: A Huey crashed in Tanay, Rizal, killing three and wounding another.

=== 2018 ===
- November 22: A Sokol helicopter carrying Coop-NATCCO party-list Representative Anthony Bravo crashed in Crow Valley, Tarlac, injuring four.

=== 2019 ===
- March 27: A C-130 cargo plane caught fire while about to take off from Clark Air Base, Pampanga. The fire was extinguished within 30 minutes. No one was injured.
- May 24: An OV-10 Bronco crashed on approach to Sangley Point Airbase in Cavite. The two pilots safely ejected and were recovered by fishermen.

=== 2020 ===
- July 23: Four soldiers died and another was injured after a helicopter crashed while taking off at Cauayan Air Station in Isabela.
- September 16: A Sikorsky S-76 ambulance helicopter crashed in Lantawan, Basilan, killing all four on board.
- November 26: Two pilots and five others were injured when a Huey carrying military casualties from counterinsurgency operations crash-landed due to mechanical trouble in Madalum, Lanao del Sur. One of the injured soldiers later died in transit.

=== 2021 ===
- January 16: A Huey crashed in the mountains of Impasug-ong, Bukidnon, killing all seven on board.
- April 27: A McDonnell Douglas MD 500 Defender helicopter crashed during an engineering flight in Getafe, Bohol, killing the pilot and injuring the other three passengers.
- June 23: An S-70i Black Hawk Utility Helicopter crashed in Capas, Tarlac, killing all six on board.
- July 4 – 2021 Philippine Air Force C-130 crash. A Lockheed C-130 Hercules crashed after an attempted landing at Jolo Airport in Sulu. 50 people on board and three civilians on the ground died.

=== 2022 ===
- May 28: A Hermes 900 unmanned aerial vehicle crash-landed while it was about to land at Lumbia Airport, Cagayan de Oro.

=== 2023 ===
- January 25: An SF260 Marchetti plane plummeted onto a rice paddy in Pilar, Bataan, killing the pilot and another aviator.
- April 8: A C-130 transport plane got one of its wheels stuck in mud on the runway of Catarman Airport during takeoff. No damage or injuries were reported and the aircraft flew to its destination in Mactan, Cebu later that day.
- April 24: An SF260 Marchetti plane encountered problems during a standard training flight at Fernando Air Base and crashed into an open field. The two pilots on board were rescued.

=== 2024 ===
- June 13: A W-3A Sokół helicopter performed an emergency landing in Moncada, Tarlac due to engine failure.
- November 1: A C-295 skidded off the runway of Basco Airport during landing, causing one of its tires to detach.

=== 2025 ===
- March 4: An FA-50PH fighter jet with the tail number 002 crashed into Mount Kalatungan in Bukidnon during an operation against the New People's Army, killing its two crew.
- September 12: An NC-212i light transport aircraft carrying 11 people had its two main tires burst during landing at Puerto Princesa International Airport, forcing its pilots to stop the aircraft in the middle of the runway. No injuries were recorded.
- November 4: A Super Huey helicopter conducting disaster reconnaissance in the aftermath of Typhoon Kalmaegi (Tino) crashed in Loreto, Agusan del Sur, killing six people.
- November 5: An S-70i Black Hawk performed an emergency landing in Saint Bernard, Southern Leyte following a technical issue.

=== 2026 ===
- May 20: An SF-260 trainer aircraft crashed in Tuba, Benguet, killing the two pilots.
- October 23: Two SF-260 trainer aircraft crashed after colliding with each other mid-air over Fernando Air Base, killing four pilots.

== Miscellaneous ==
- April 5, 1997: A bush fire triggered the explosion of bombs stored at Basa Air Base, leaving a deep crater in the depot area, injuring 15 and causing extensive damage inside the base and in neighboring residential areas.
