= Rafael Alunan Sr. =

Filipino lawyer and politician (1885–1947)

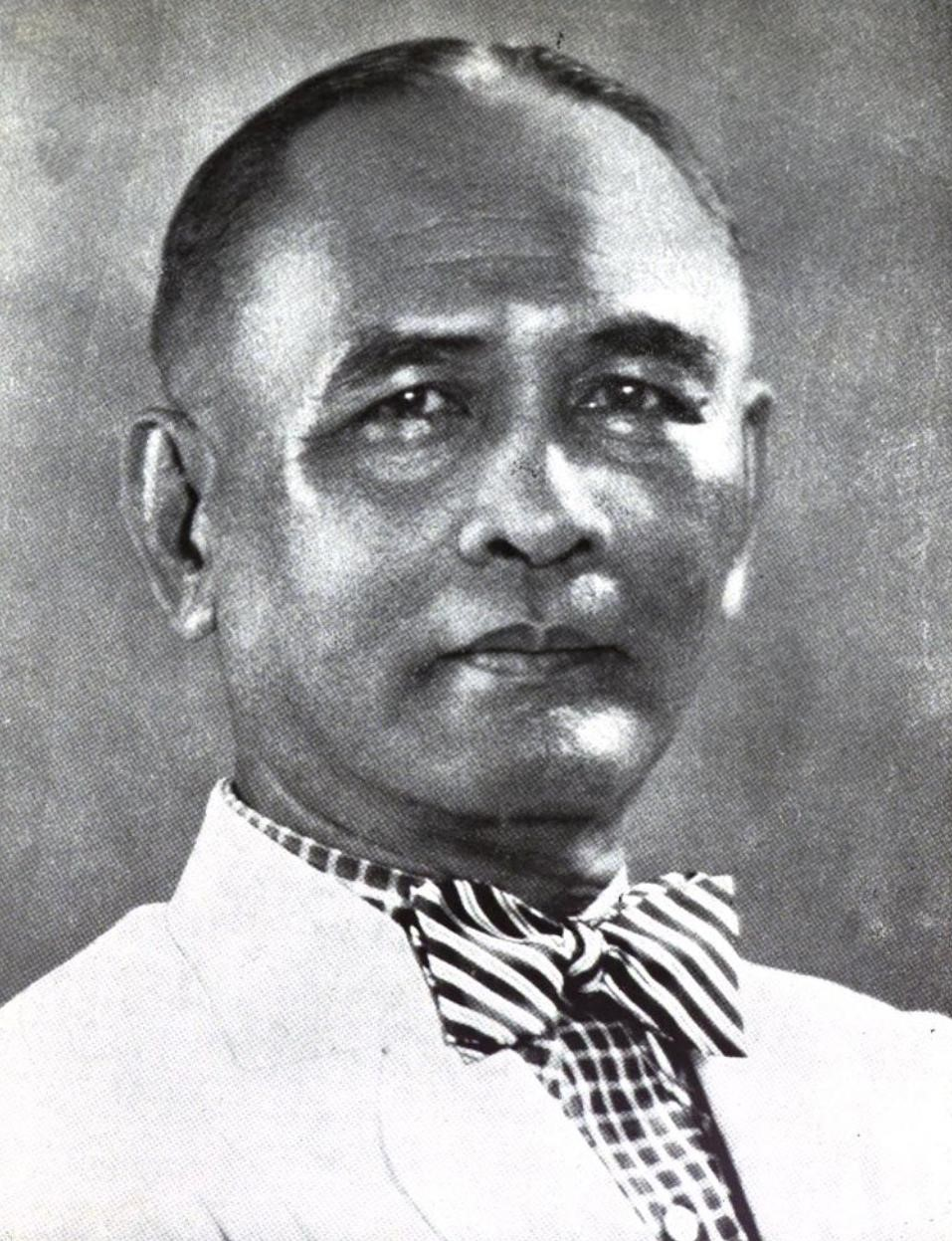
- Photograph from The Commercial & Industrial Manual of the Philippines, 1941

Secretary of the Interior of the Commonwealth of the Philippines
- In office November 16, 1938 – August 29, 1941
- Preceded by: Elpidio Quirino
- Succeeded by: Francisco Zulueta

Secretary of Agriculture and Commerce
- In office September 6, 1928 – January 1, 1933
- Preceded by: Silverio Apostol
- Succeeded by: Vicente Singson Encarnacion
- In office August 28, 1941 – December 24, 1941
- Preceded by: Benigno Aquino Sr.
- Succeeded by: Vicente Singson Encarnacion
- In office January 26, 1942 – March 20, 1945
- Preceded by: Andrés Soriano
- Succeeded by: Manuel Nieto

Secretary of Finance
- In office January 1, 1933 – April 30, 1933
- Preceded by: Vicente Carmona
- Succeeded by: Vicente Singson Encarnacion

Member of the House of Representatives from Negros Occidental's 2nd district
- In office October 16, 1912 – June 6, 1922
- Preceded by: Manuel Fernández Yanson
- Succeeded by: Vicente Jiménez Yanson

Personal details
- Born: December 16, 1885 Talisay, Negros Occidental, Captaincy General of the Philippines
- Died: May 18, 1947 (aged 61) Mount Makaturing, Lanao del Sur, Philippines
- Cause of death: Plane crash
- Resting place: Manila, Philippines
- Party: Nacionalista
- Education: Colegio de Bacolod Ateneo de Manila University

Rafael Rivas Alunan Sr. (December 16, 1885 – May 18, 1947) was a Filipino lawyer and politician. Alunan served as a senator in the Senate of the Philippines and influenced the Philippines' growth economically during the American Occupation years.

== Early life and education ==
Rafael Rivas Alunan was born on December 16, 1885 in Talisay City, Negros Occidental to Raymundo Labayen Alunan and Josefa Rivas. He studied in the Colegio de Bacolod de los Recolectos, where he obtained a bachelor's degree in art, before studying in Ateneo de Manila University, where he studied business, and got his degree when he was 17 years old in the class of 1902, and later on, law in the class of 1910.

== Political career ==
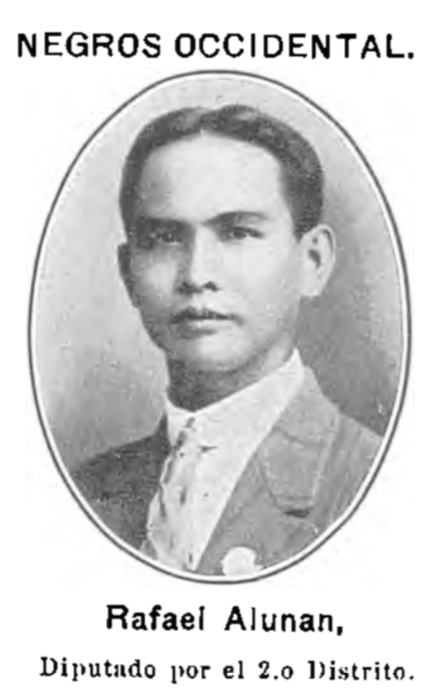
Alunan as member of the Philippine Assembly, c. 1913

In 1912, Alunan became a member of the Philippine House of Representatives for Negros Occidental's 2nd congressional district. He was re-elected in 1916, becoming the Majority Floor Leader, and again in 1919.

Alunan in 1919

In 1928, Alunan succeeded Silverio Apostol as Secretary of Agriculture, Industry and Commerce. While in this position, he attended multiple meetings to the United States to discuss Filipino economic growth. In 1933, Alunan was moved from his previous position to being the Secretary of Finance, as well as acting Secretary of Public Works and Communications. However, Alunan served only four months in this position, refusing to continue due to a conflict of interest he held as the President of the Philippine Sugar Association.

In 1938, Manuel L. Quezon appointed Alunan as Secretary of the Interior, which he held until August 1941, when he was re-appointed as Secretary of Agriculture, serving only four months due to the Japanese occupation of the Philippines in December. However, Alunan returned as the Secretary of Agriculture under the occupation, serving for over three years in his third non-consecutive stint. 5 days later, the newly elected Filipino President, Jose P. Laurel re-established his position as Secretary of Agriculture until the end of the Japanese Occupation in March 1945.

In 1947, Alunan was appointed one of five Directors of the National Land Settlement Administration (now the Department of Agrarian Reform). This was his last position due to his death in May of the same year.

== Treason charge ==
In 1945, all of the occupation Laurel Administration's cabinet members, including Alunan, were placed under trial for treason against the people in the Philippines. Alunan was found not guilty, as the court determined his duties as Secretary of Agriculture did not show sympathisation or aid to the Japanese.

== Business career ==
Alunan was also the president of the Bacolod-Murcia Milling Company, which controlled much of the Philippines' Sugar in 1928 while Alunan was president of the company. Alunan also held the presidencies of the Philippine-American Trade Association and Philippine Sugar Association, often meeting with America to discuss the sugar resources in the Philippines and lobby the American government to make goods cheaper for Filipino citizens.

== Death ==
After a meeting in Cotabato regarding the newly formed National Land Settlement Administration (now the Department of Agrarian Reform), Alunan was on board the Lili Marlene bound for Dansalan, when the aircraft crashed near Mount Makaturing in Lanao del Sur. He was one of 17 on board, including Chief of Staff of the Philippine Air Army Corps, Colonel Edwin Andrews, and his successor to the Secretary of the Interior, Francisco Zulueta.

== Personal life ==
Alunan was married to Asuncion de la Rama whom he had seven children with. His grandson, Rafael Alunan III was the Secretary of Tourism under Corazon Aquino and the Secretary of the Interior and Local Government under Fidel V. Ramos.
