= Lake Butig National Park =

Protected area in Lanao, del Sur, Philippines

- IUCN category V (protected landscape/seascape)
- Location within Mindanao mainland Location within Philippines
- Location: Lanao del Sur, Philippines
- Nearest city: Marawi, Lanao del Sur, Philippines
- Coordinates: 7°59′N 124°29′E
- Area: 68 hectares (170 acres)
- Established: May 5, 1965
- Governing body: Department of Environment and Natural Resources

Lake Butig National Park is a protected area of the Philippines located in the municipality of Butig, Lanao del Sur in Mindanao Island. The park spans an area of 68 hectares comprising Lake Butig and its surrounding forest. It was declared a national park in 1965 by virtue of Republic Act No. 4190.

== Topography and ecology ==
Lake Butig lies in the southern part of Lanao del Sur at the foot of the Butig Mountain range. It is located specifically at the Barangay of Pindolonan, Butig, Lanao del Sur. At 500 meters above sea level, the lake is a magnet for visitors seeking to cool off where a swimming resort has been set up owing to its invigorating climate. The surrounding forest has been known to house at least four species of birds: hornbills, parrots, woodpeckers and wild ducks. Other fauna includes Philippine monkeys, Philippine deer and wild pigs.

Mounts Makaturing and Somiorang river form Barangay Dalama and Lingcoan, Lunay near in Tambac, Macadar a natural backdrop to the lake. It can be reached via the Lake Lanao Circumferential Road from Marawi, a 30-kilometer journey.

== See also ==
- List of national parks of the Philippines
