= Francisco Zulueta =

Filipino judge and senator (1891–1947)

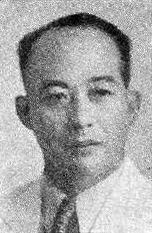

Senator of the Philippines from the 8th District
- In office September 18, 1929 – June 5, 1934 Serving with Gil Montilla
- Preceded by: Mariano Yulo
- Succeeded by: Isaac Lacson

Secretary of the Interior of the Commonwealth of the Philippines
- In office August 29, 1941 – December 22, 1941
- President: Manuel Quezon
- Preceded by: Rafael Alunan Sr.
- Succeeded by: Benigno Aquino Sr. (Second Philippine Republic); Tomas Confesor (Commonwealth)

Member of the National Assembly of the Philippines from Bacolod's at-large district
- In office September 25, 1943 – February 2, 1944
- Preceded by: district established
- Succeeded by: district abolished Romeo Guanzon (as Congressman)

Personal details
- Born: August 21, 1891 Molo, Iloilo, Captaincy General of the Philippines
- Died: May 18, 1947 (aged 55) Mount Makaturing, Butig, Lanao del Sur, Philippines
- Party: KALIBAPI (1942–1945); Nacionalista (1929–1934)
- Relatives: Jose Zulueta (brother)

Francisco Casten Zulueta (August 21, 1891 – May 18, 1947) was a Filipino judge and senator. He also served as Secretary of the Interior of the Commonwealth of the Philippines.

== Biography ==
Francisco Zulueta was born on August 21, 1891, in Molo, today a district in Iloilo City. His parents were Evaristo Zulueta and Atilana Casten. After earning a Bachelor of Arts degree from the Ateneo Municipal de Manila, Zulueta studied law at the Escuela de Derecho de Manila. He completed his bachelor's degree and subsequently worked as a stenographer and clerk for the Court of First Instance of Manila. A promotion to prosecutor (fiscal) of Antique followed in 1920. In 1922 he was transferred to Capiz and in 1924 to Negros Occidental.

After five years as a prosecutor in Negros Occidental, Zulueta was appointed an assistant judge of a Court of First Instance on June 11, 1929. Later that year, Zulueta was elected to succeed the late Mariano Yulo in the Senate of the Philippines in a special election on behalf of the 8th District. Because he was supported in the election by both the "antis" and the "cons" (the two factions of the Nacionalista Party), he became the only member of the American-era Senate to be elected without an opponent. In the Senate, Zulueta chaired the nomination committee and the health committee. He was re-elected in the 1931 elections and served until 1934. During that time, he was a member of the Philippine Independence mission led by Senate President Manuel Quezon to the United States that led to the passage of the Tydings–McDuffie Act that established the Philippine Commonwealth and led to full independence after ten years.

That same year he was appointed a Judge of a Court of First Instance in Zamboanga and Sulu. In June 1936, Zulueta was appointed judge of the Court of First Instance in Cavite. He was also a judge of the Court of Industrial Relations. From 1939 until the invasion of the Japanese in World War II, Zulueta served as Secretary of the Interior of the Commonwealth of the Philippines under President Quezon. During the Japanese occupation, Zulueta was one of the most important members of the National Assembly of the Second Philippine Republic, representing Bacolod City and serving as Floor Leader from 1943 to 1944.

After the war, Zulueta was the manager of the National Land Settlement Administration. While performing this duties, Zulueta died in 1947 at the age of 55 after the military transport plane he was in, the Lili Marlene, crashed into Mount Makaturing in Lanao. All 17 people on board, including Philippine Air Force Commander Colonel Edwin Andrews, were killed.

== Personal life ==
Zulueta was married to Paula Menchaca. His younger brother Jose Zulueta served as a congressman, governor of Iloilo and senator, among others.
