= List of accidents and incidents involving the DC-3 in 1947 =

This is a List of accidents and incidents involving Douglas DC-3 ^{A} variants that have taken place in the year 1947, including aircraft based on the DC-3 airframe such as the Douglas C-47 Skytrain and Lisunov Li-2 and military variants converted to DC-3 standard for post-war airline use. Military accidents are included; and hijackings and incidents of terrorism are covered, although acts of war are outside the scope of this list.

== January ==
January 11
In the United Kingdom, a BOAC C-47A crashed at Stowting, Kent crashed while attempting to land at Lympne Airport after multiple diversions caused by bad weather, killing eight of 16 on board.
January 12
In the United States, Eastern Airlines Flight 665 (a C-49-DO, registration NC88872) crashed at Galax, Virginia after the pilot intentionally deviated from the flight route and got lost, killing 18 of 19 on board.
January 22
In Colombia, an Avianca DC-3 converted from a C-53B (registration C-108) crashed in the jungle near Puesto Aruajo, killing all 17 on board; the wreckage was found a week later.
January 25
In China, a DC-3 (registration 138) of China National Aviation Corporation crashed while on a domestic flight with a crew of three and sixteen passengers from Guangzhou to Chongqing. All nineteen occupants were killed in the crash in mountainous terrain about 190 kilometres (120 mi) from the aircraft's destination.
January 25
While at an altitude of 1,570 feet (480 m) on approach to land at Hong Kong, a Philippine Airlines DC-3 conversion of a C-47A (registration PI-C12) struck 1,723-foot (525 m) high Mount Parker, killing all four crew.
January 25
In the United Kingdom, a DC-3 (converted from a C-47) of Southern Rhodesian (now Zimbabwe) airline Spencer Airways, registration VP-YFD, crashed on takeoff from Croydon Airport in London due to pilot error, killing 12 of 23 on board. The aircraft struck a parked ČSA DC-3 registered OK-WDB, which caught fire and was written off.
January 26
In Denmark, a DC-3C of Dutch airline KLM (registration PH-TCR) crashed on takeoff from Copenhagen's Kastrup Airport, killing all 22 on board including Prince Gustaf Adolf of Sweden and American opera singer Grace Moore. A member of the airport ground staff, who had less than three weeks' work experience and no training, did not remove the elevator control locks, causing the aircraft to climb at an extreme angle after lifting off the ground and stall.

== February ==
February 1
In Portugal, a DC-3C converted from a C-47A of Air France (registration F-BAXQ) struck Serra de Cintra in bad weather while on approach to Lisbon, killing 15 of 16 on board.
February 5
An International Air Freight DC-3C (converted from a C-47A) with registration NC54451 crashed at Harrington, Delaware in the United States after an engine lost power due to fuel contamination, killing one of three crew on board.
February 14
In the United States, an Atlantic & Pacific Airlines DC-3 conversion of a C-47A (registration NC59398) force-landed at an abandoned army airfield near League City, Texas due to double engine failure. The pilot, who was the only person on board, survived, but the aircraft was written off.
February 17
A Danish Air Lines C-47A (registration OY-AEB) on a domestic flight from Aalborg to Copenhagen was force-landed on the sea ice off Malmö, Sweden> The crew diverted the aircraft from Copenhagen to Malmö because of bad weather and carried out the forced landing while returning to Copenhagen after diverting from Malmö due to fog; all four crew survived, but the aircraft was written off after it burned out following the forced landing.
February 24
In the United States a United Air Lines DC-3A-197E (registration NC33646) crashed at Philadelphia, Pennsylvania.

== March ==
March 5
Aeroflot Flight 34 (operated by a C-47B registered CCCP-L952) disappeared while operating a Moscow-Tbilisi passenger service; the aircraft was found on June 20 on a mountain in the North Caucasus Mountains; all 23 on board had died. The pilot, who wanted to land on time, straightened his route through the mountains and the aircraft encountered possible icing conditions.
March 8
A VIARCO C-47-DL converted to DC-3 standard (registration C-400) struck a mountainside 12 minutes after takeoff from Villavicencio on a domestic flight to Bogotá in Colombia, killing all nine on board; the wreckage was found four days later.
March 14
An Air France C-47A (registration F-BAXO) on a domestic flight struck 7,493-foot (2,284 m) high Mont Moucherolle near Château-Bernard due to a navigation error, killing all 23 on board.

== April ==
April 22
In the Soviet Union an Aeroflot/Krasnoyarsk C-47-DL (registration CCCP-L1204, formerly 42-32892) force-landed in tundra near Volochanka due to engine failure; all 37 on board survived, but nine disappeared while searching for help. The pilot's body was found in a bog 120 km (75 mi) southwest of the crash site in 1953; the remaining eight have never been found. The 25 survivors were rescued three weeks later by an Li-2. In 2016, the aircraft was salvaged and transported by water to Krasnoyarsk for restoration and eventual display in the Museum of the Exploration of the Russian North.
April 22
In the United States, a Delta Air Lines DC-3C (registration NC49657) crashed at Muscogee County Airport in Columbus, Georgia after a private Vultee BT-13 Valiant (NC55312) landed on it while it was taking off, killing all eight on board the DC-3; the BT-13 also crashed, killing the pilot.

== May ==
May 16
An Aeroflot/Far East C-47A (CCCP-L1048) crashed at Khabarovsk in the Soviet Union after a wing struck a broadcast station tower while landing in low visibility, killing all 22 on board.
May 18
A Philippine Air Force C-47 "Lili Marlene" (1002) was controlled into terrain at Mount Makaturing due to the plane being overweight, killing all 17 (confirmed) people on board.
May 29
A Flugfélag Íslands C-47A (registration TF-ISI) crashed at Héðinsfjörður, Iceland in bad weather, killing all 25 on board.

== June ==
June 16
An Aeroflot/Kazakhstan Li-2 (CCCP-L4088) crashed on takeoff from Leninabad Airport due to overloading, killing three of seven on board. The aircraft was operating a Leninabad (now Khujand)–Alma-Ata (now Almaty) cargo service.
June 21
An Aeroflot/Ukraine Li-2 (CCCP-L4138) ditched in Karkinitsky Bay due to a loss of engine power, killing eight of twenty-nine on board.

== July ==
July 13
In the United States a Burke Air Transport DC-3C (registration NC79024) crashed near Melbourne, Florida due to crew fatigue, killing 14 of 26 on board.

== August ==
August 6
In the Soviet Union, an Aeroflot Li-2 (registration CCCP-L4017) stalled and crashed at Severo-Vostochny Bank, Azerbaijan during a training flight after a loss of speed while turning, killing four of six crew.
August 8
In the United States an American Airlines DC-3C (registration NX88787) crashed at New York's LaGuardia Airport due to pilot error, killing three of five on board.
August 9
An AB Aerotransport DC-3F (registration SE-BAY) overran the runway on landing at Malmö, Sweden, killing one of five on board.
August 13
In Romania a TARS Li-2 (registration YR-TAV) crashed at Băneasa Airport on the outskirts of Bucharest, killing three.

== September ==
September 3
A Hellenic Airlines C-47A (SX-BAB) crashed on a beach at Voula, Greece following a wind shift while on approach to Hassani Airport, killing three crew. The aircraft was on a training flight.
September 6
US Navy R4D-5 17093 crashed at Grosse Ile NAS, Michigan.
September 8
USAAF C-47B 43-48721 struck a mountain 4.1 mi south of Larkspur, Colorado, killing the three crew.
September 13
A Philippine Air Lines DC-3 (PI-C59) was written off in an accident at Zamboanga, Philippines.
September 17
A Compania Anonima Vuelos Express C-47A (YV-C-CAJ) crashed on landing at Carlota, Venezuela; both pilots survived.
September 18
A Tata Airlines C-47A (VT-CFL) crashed at Junagarh, India.
September 27
A Royal Indian Air Force C-47 crashed on landing at Palam Air Force Station, killing 13 of 20 on board.

== October ==
October 9
USAF C-47B 43-48810 was written off after suffering engine failure on takeoff from Albrook AFB, Panama.
October 10
USAF C-47B 43-48296 crashed in the Andes mountains 40 mi SSW of Borja, Peru, killing all six on board (including Col. John R. Hawkins, Chief of USAF Mission Peru); the wreckage was found on October 20.
October 13
US Navy R4D-5 12421 crashed shortly after takeoff from Changchun Airport in a blizzard and broke in two; no casualties.
October 14
USAF C-47A 42-23503 crashed on Pikes Peak due to pilot error and weather, killing three of seven on board.
October 16
A Strato-Freight DC-3 struck a mountain at Sylva, North Carolina due to pilot error and weather, killing all three on board.
October 17
A Civil Air Transport DC-3 crashed near Hopei AFB, China, killing the three crew.
October 27
A CNAC DC-3 was shot down by communist anti-aircraft fire and crashed near Yulin, China, killing two of three on board.
October 31
Royal Indian Air Force C-47A MA965 disappeared with 25 on board while carrying troops from Ambala Air Force Station to Srinagar; the wreckage was found in June 1980 in the Pir Panjal Range.

== November ==
November 13
An Air-India C-53 (VT-ATI) overran the runway on landing at Jammu Airport; no casualties.
November 15
USAF C-47B 44-77252 was written off at Adak, Alaska.
November 21
In Czechoslovakia an Li-2P (registration YR-TAI) of Romanian airline TARS struck Tabor Peak in fog due to radio failure, killing 13 of 26 on board.
November 22
A Philippine Air Express DC-3 crashed in the sea off Rizal Province, Philippines, killing all five on board.
November 27
In Yugoslavia, JUSTA Flight 247 (an Li-2P, registration YU-BAD) struck a mountain near Rumija, Montenegro in a freak snowstorm, killing all 23 on board.
November 27
A Columbia Air Cargo C-47 (NC95486) crashed while on approach to Yakutat Airport due to pilot error, killing all 13 on board.
November 28
USAF C-47B 43-48796 crashed in the Italian Alps near Trappa, Italy some 30 mi off course, killing all 20 on board; wreckage was found on January 31, 1948, by Italian skiers.
November 30
USAF C-47B 45-1066 struck the crater of Mount Hoeizan (a secondary peak on the side of Mount Fuji), killing both pilots; wreckage was found two days later.

== December ==
December 10
USAF C-47B 45-1060 crashed short of the runway at Andrews AFB, killing one of six on board.
December 11
USAF C-47B 44-76366 spiraled down and crashed near Memphis, Tennessee for reasons unknown, killing all 20 on board.
December 18
In the Soviet Union an Aeroflot C-47 (CCCP-L997) crashed near Tyoply Stan, Moscow region during a test flight due to crew error; the casualty count was unknown.
December 27
An Air India C-48-DO (registration VT-AUG) crashed at Korangi Creek, Pakistan due to instrument malfunction, killing all 23 on board.
December 30
An Aeroflot/Moscow Li-2 (CCCP-L4214) struck a mountain 20 km north of Zlatoust in the Soviet Union, killing all six on board.>

== See also ==
- List of accidents and incidents involving the DC-3 in the 1940s

== Notes ==
^Note A Military versions of the DC-3 were known as C-47 Skytrain, C-48, C-49, C-50, C-51, C-52, C-53 Skytrooper, C-68, C-84, C-117 and YC-129 by the United States Army Air Forces and as the R4D by the United States Navy. In Royal Air Force (and other British Commonwealth air forces') service, these aircraft were known as Dakotas.
