= Manuel Lopez (politician) =

Filipino lawyer and politician (1875-1947)

The Honourable Manuel López
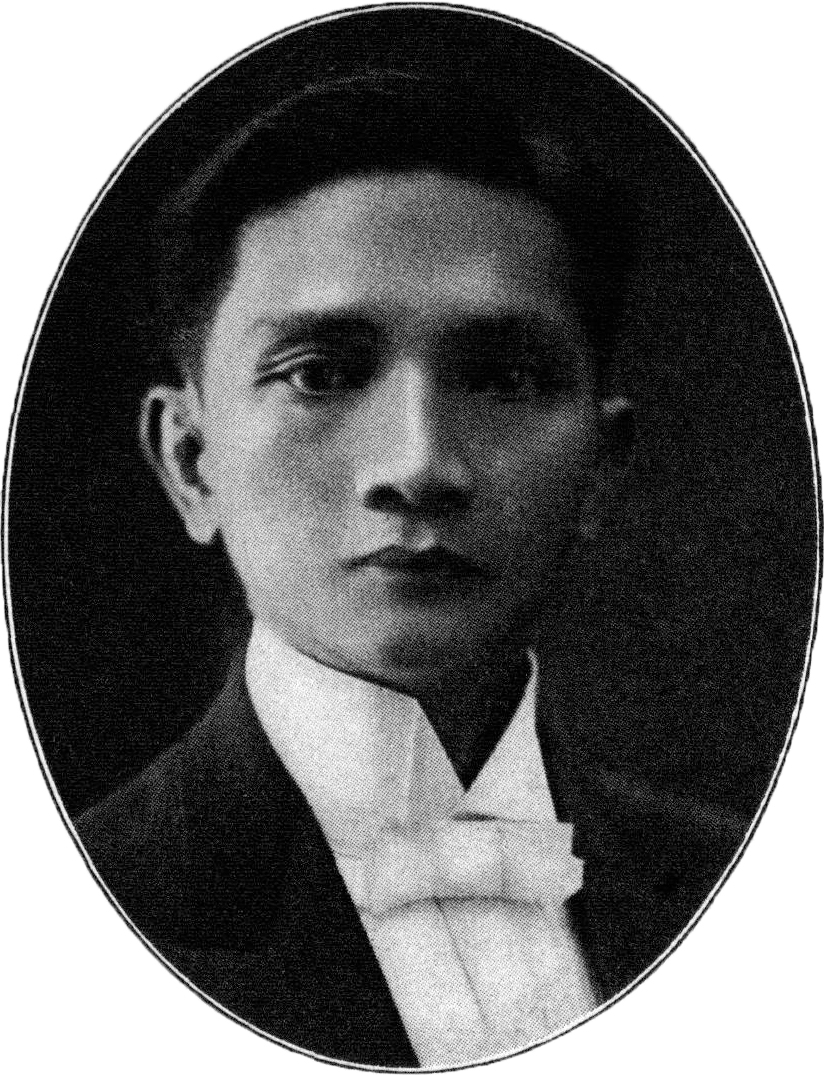
- Official portrait, c. 1917

Senator of the Philippines from the 8th district
- In office October 16, 1916 – June 3, 1919 Serving with Espiridion Guanco
- Preceded by: Post created
- Succeeded by: Hermenegildo Villanueva

5th Governor of Negros Occidental
- In office May 9, 1906 – September 25, 1907
- Preceded by: Antonio Ledesma Jayme
- Succeeded by: Mariano Yulo

Personal details
- Born: Manuel López y Villanueva; June 9, 1876 Molo, Iloilo, Captaincy General of the Philippines
- Died: January 14, 1947 (aged 70)
- Party: Nacionalista
- Parents: Marcelo López; Julita Villanueva
- Relatives: López family

Manuel Villanueva López (June 9, 1876 - January 14, 1947) was a Filipino lawyer and politician. He served as Governor of Negros Occidental from May 9, 1906 to September 25, 1907. He later represented the eighth district at the Senate of the Philippines from October 16, 1916 to June 3, 1919.

== Biography ==
Manuel López was born on June 9, 1876, in Molo, now a district of Iloilo City, to Marcelo López and Julita Villanueva. He has a brother named José, a member of the Philippine Assembly from Negros Occidental. He studied law at the University of Santo Tomas, where he received his bachelor's degree in law in 1898. On November 29, 1901, he was admitted to the Philippine bar.

During the Philippine Revolution, he was appointed as the military commander of revolutionary forces in Victorias, Negros Occidental in 1898, and following the Spanish defeat, was promoted by the revolutionary government to become prosecutor and registrar, a role which he continued during the Negros Republic.

From 1906 to 1907, López served as governor of Negros Occidental, during which he helped suppress the revolutionary leader Papa Isio. In the 1916 elections, López was elected to the newly established Senate of the Philippines representing the 8th senatorial district. Because he received fewer votes than Espiridión Guanco in the district, he won a three-year term and served until 1919.

In 1917, López became the chairperson for the Senate Committee on Agriculture and Natural Resources.
