= Mary Grace Baloyo =

Filipino military officer (1973–2001)

Mary Grace P. Baloyo
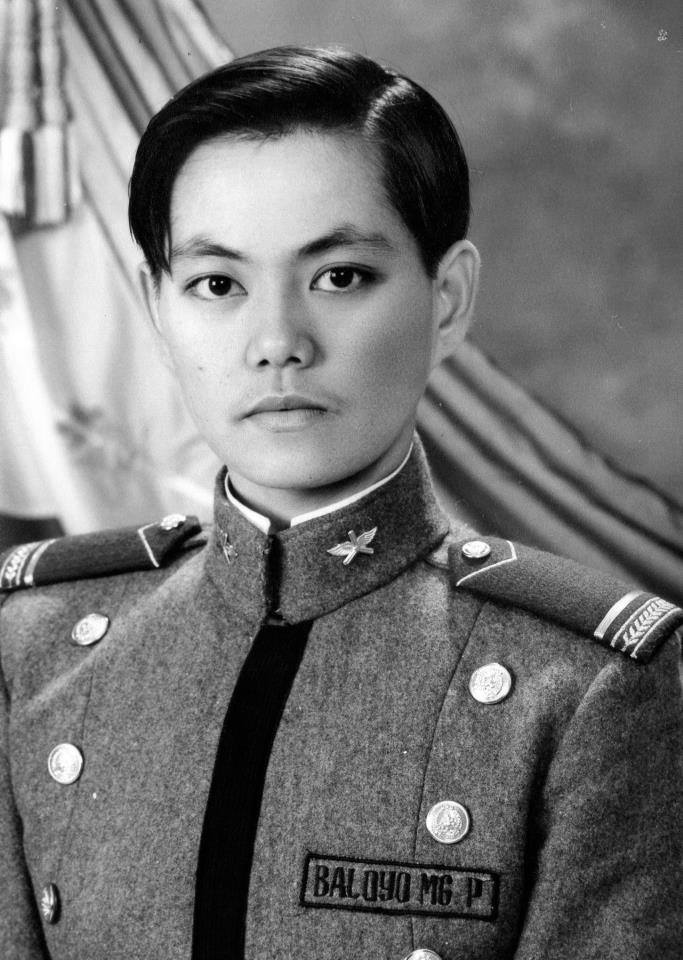
- Air Force Captain Mary Grace Baloyo in the uniform of an Aviation Cadet
- Born: October 30, 1973; Bacolod, Negros Occidental, Philippines
- Died: March 26, 2001 (aged 27); Mabalacat, Pampanga, Philippines
- Military career
- Allegiance: Philippines
- Branch: Philippine Air Force
- Service years: 1995–2001
- Rank: Captain
- Nickname: "Amazing Grace"
- Unit: 15th Strike Wing
- Awards: Medal of Valor

Mary Grace Pango Baloyo (October 30, 1973 – March 26, 2001) was a Filipino flight officer in the Philippine Air Force who posthumously became the first female member of the Armed Forces of the Philippines to receive the Medal of Valor.

== Early life ==
Mary Grace Baloyo was born in Bacolod, Negros Occidental to Rommie Baloyo and Annie Pango, who were meat vendors at the city's Libertad Market. Baloyo took up her primary and secondary education in her hometown, and graduated from the St. Scholastica's Academy in 1991. She then entered Cebu Institute of Technology – University and took up Bachelor's Science degree in Airline Management. Upon earning her bachelor's degree, she applied and passed for the Philippine Air Force Flying School (PAFFS) at Basilio Fernando Air Base in Lipa City, Batangas, taking up her wings on Cessna T-41 Mescalero and SIAI-Marchetti SF.260. She completed her flight qualifications and finished with the PAFFS Class of 1997.

== Military career ==
Upon graduation from PAFFS, Lt. Baloyo was assigned to the 15th Strike Wing in Danilo Atienza Air Base, Sangley Point, Cavite City, where she was one of 36 flight officers of the unit, and one of 6 combat rated female pilots of the PAF on OV-10 Bronco.

On 26 March 2001, Lt. Baloyo flew with Capt. Ben Nasayao on a proficiency flight from Danilo Atienza Airbase to Clark Air Base. While in the vicinity of Mabalacat, Pampanga, approaching Clark's Runway 20 at 1,000 feet (300 m) above ground level the aircraft's engine failed and thus rapidly descended into a heavily populated area. Capt. Nasayao ejected at 300 feet (91 m) above ground level sustaining injuries, while Lt. Baloyo remained on board and diverted the aircraft in an open field of Fil-Homes Subdivision, Barangay Mabiga. Lt. Baloyo was instantly killed by the crash. She was posthumously promoted to the rank of Captain.

== Honors ==
To date, Lt. Baloyo is one of only four recipients of the Medal of Valor from the Philippine Air Force, and the only female officer.

== See also ==
- List of accidents and incidents involving Philippine Air Force aircraft
