= Yulo's Park =

- Parke ng Yulo
- Interactive map of the Yulo's Park area

General information
- Location: Bacolod, Philippines
- Coordinates: 10°39′58.4″N 122°56′24.5″E
- Inaugurated: August 10, 1919
- Owner: Yulo family

Technical details
- Material: Concrete, wood
- Floor count: 2

Yulo's Park (Filipino: Parke ng Yulo) is a historic house and gathering place in Bacolod, Negros Occidental, Philippines built on August 10, 1919 by Mariano Yulo. It is an Important Cultural Property.

== History ==
The house at Yulo's Park was built on August 10, 1919 by Mariano Yulo, Governor of Negros Occidental and later Commonwealth-era Senator.

The first inter-island telephone call between Negros and Panay islands was made at Yulo's Park. on December 28, 1926. Senator Yulo called Iloilo Governor Jose Ledesma.

The house was inherited by his son, Alfredo Yulo who was mayor of Bacolod from 1940 to 1942.

It earned its name from being known as a gathering place prior to the establishment of the Bacolod Public Plaza. It served as a meeting place for executives of Yulo's Water Works, the precursor of the Bacolod City Water District (Baciwa). It was used by Presidents Manuel L. Quezon and Sergio Osmeña.

During the Japanese occupation of World War II, Yulo's Park was spared due to Alfredo Yulo's role as mayor. It also hosted a air raid shelter which has since been removed.

The Yulo family has kept the Yulo's Park close to the general public. The compound also gradually shrank from a hectare due to encroachment and reclamation work since the 1960s. The house also deteriorated.

This changed in 2024, when the Yulo's have opened the house to the public although visits are limited on an appointment basis.

== Architecture and design ==
The Yulo's Park is a two-storey house. The first floor is made of concrete while the second is made of wood, It sits on a 6,000-square-meter (65,000 sq ft) land.

== Heritage designation ==
The National Museum of the Philippines recognized the Yulo's Park as an Important Cultural Property on September 28, 2017. A historical marker was unveiled on August 22, 2024.
