= Jose Zulueta =

President of the Senate of the Philippines in 1953

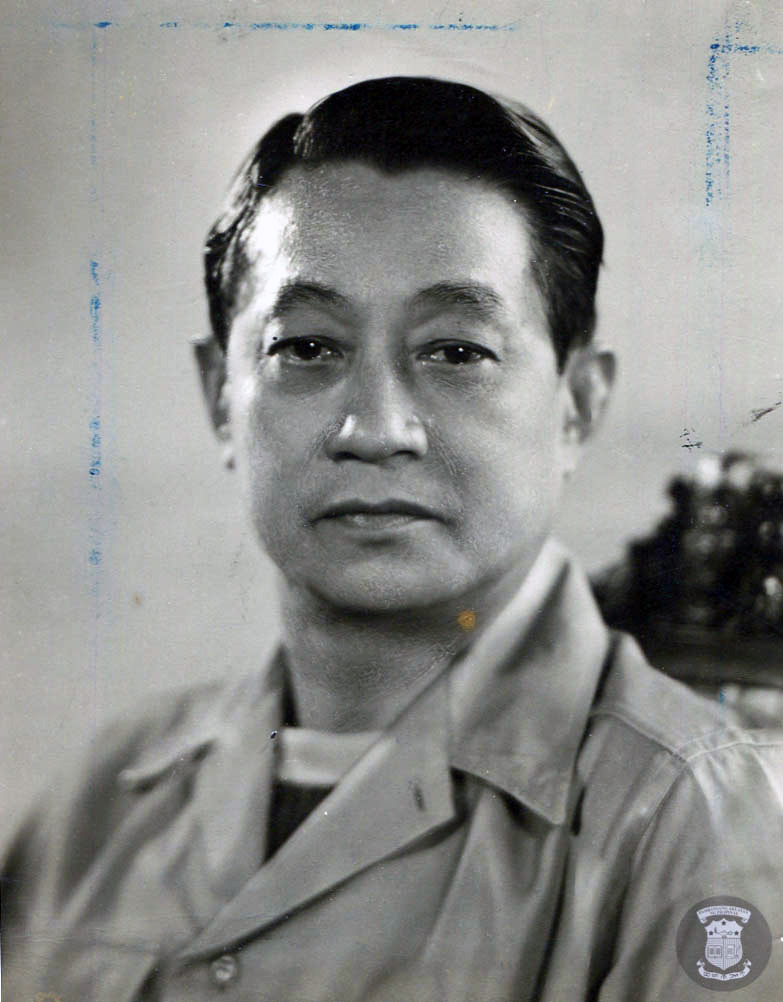

9th President of the Senate of the Philippines
- In office April 30, 1953 – May 20, 1953
- Preceded by: Camilo Osías
- Succeeded by: Eulogio Rodriguez

Senator of the Philippines
- In office December 30, 1951 – December 30, 1957

7th Speaker of the Philippine House of Representatives
- In office June 9, 1945 – December 20, 1945
- Preceded by: Benigno Aquino, Sr. (Note: Aquino served as Speaker of the National Assembly during the Japanese Occupation (1942-1945))
- Succeeded by: Eugenio Pérez

Member of the Philippine House of Representatives from Iloilo's 1st district
- In office June 5, 1928 – May 28, 1946
- Preceded by: Eugenio Baldana
- Succeeded by: Mateo M. Nonato
- In office December 30, 1949 – December 30, 1951
- Preceded by: Mateo M. Nonato
- Succeeded by: Pedro G. Trono
- In office December 30, 1969 – September 23, 1972
- Preceded by: Pedro G. Trono
- Succeeded by: Vacant (Note: When Martial Law was declared, the Congress was dissolved.); Post later held by Oscar G. Garin

23rd Governor of Iloilo
- In office January 1, 1960 – December 31, 1963
- Vice Governor: Guardalino Mosqueda
- Preceded by: Mariano Peñaflorida
- Succeeded by: Rafael Palmares

Secretary of the Interior
- In office May 28, 1946 – April 17, 1948
- President: Manuel Roxas
- Preceded by: Rafael Alunan Sr.
- Succeeded by: Sotero Baluyut

Personal details
- Born: José Zulueta y Casten; November 23, 1889 Molo, Iloilo, Captaincy General of the Philippines
- Died: December 6, 1972 (aged 83) Paco, Manila, Philippines
- Party: Nacionalista (1928–1946, 1951–1953, 1960–1972)
- Other political affiliations: Liberal (1946–1951, 1953); People's (Veterans) Democratic Movement for Good Government (1957)
- Spouse: Soledad B. Ramos
- Relatives: Francisco Zulueta (brother)
- Education: Ateneo de Manila
- Profession: Lawyer, politician

Jose Casten Zulueta (November 23, 1889 – December 6, 1972) was a Filipino lawyer and politician. He served as Senate President for a brief period in 1953.

== Early life and education ==
Jose Zulueta was born to Evaristo Zulueta and Atilana Casten. Zulueta studied at the Ateneo de Manila. In 1911 he was appointed as a stenographer at Court of First Instance. He studied law and graduated in 1916 for the entrance examination for the Philippine bar (bar exam) and started a law practice.

== Political career ==
=== House of Representatives ===
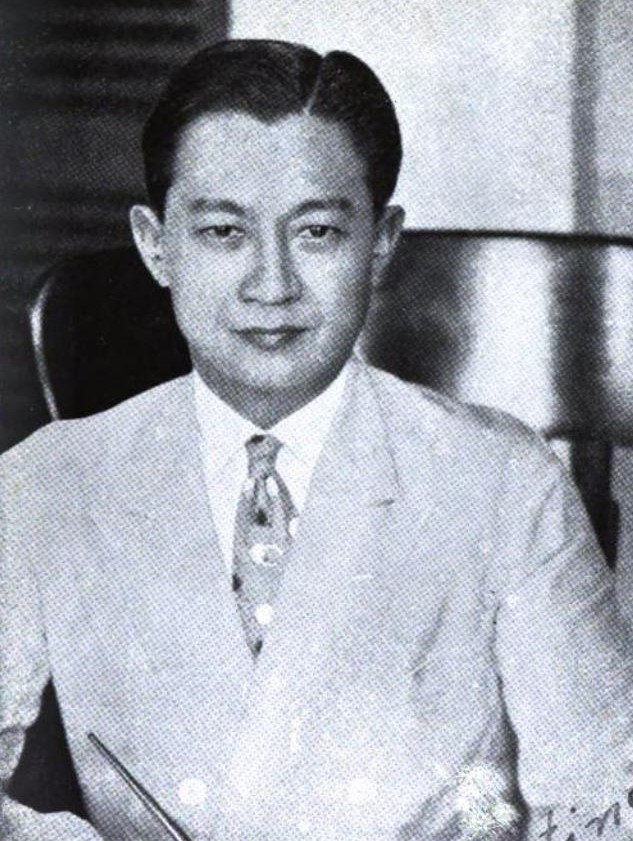
Photograph from The Commercial & Industrial Manual of the Philippines, 1941

In 1928, Zulueta was elected to the House of Representatives of the Philippines on behalf of the 1st constituency of Iloilo. He was re-elected several times, and he would sit in the House until 1946. During the Japanese occupation, Zulueta was accused of collaboration, along with Jorge Vargas, Jorge Bocobo and Manuel Roxas, being the first to respond to General Homma's order to form an Executive Commission. After the establishment of the Philippine Republic in 1946, the Department of Interior was restored and Zulueta was appointed by President Manuel Roxas once again to head the agency until 1948. Zulueta's term was marked by heightened tensions with the Hukbalahap movement, with Zulueta instituting a pass system that was required of Central Luzon residents wishing to travel outside their towns. Like his mentor Roxas, he adopted a hardline attitude toward the Huks, declaring in 1947 that the Huks faced only two choices: surrender or annihilation. He gave carte blanche to the Philippine Constabulary in all their operations against "dissidents". He was in charge of negotiating several times with its leaders, including Luis Lava, Luis Taruc, Juan Feleo and Jose de Leon.

In 1946, Zulueta was elected as Speaker of the House of Representatives in the inaugural session of the Congress.

After his term as minister he stood in April 1949 successfully apply for a new term in the House of Representatives. Before the end of his term, he is more than two years later at the 1951 election elected to the Philippine Senate.

=== Senator of the Philippines ===
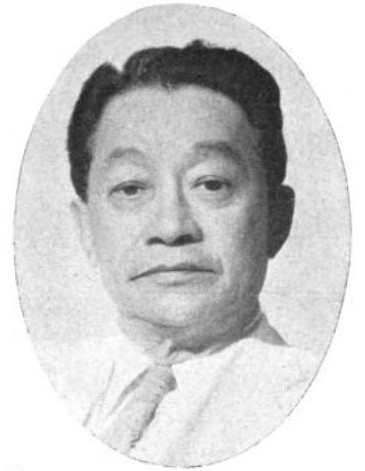
Zulueta in 1951

In 1951, he joined the Nacionalista Party and ran as a candidate in the 1953 vice-presidential nomination at the Nacionalista Convention. In his time as a senator, which lasted until 1957, he was President of the Senate from April 30 to May 20, 1953.

He initially supported the Nacionalista Party to further his political fortunes but switched sides by forming an agreement with the Liberal Party. Unsatisfied with the Nacionalista Party, he strengthened his support for the Liberal Party. As a result of the power struggle within the Philippine Senate, the Nacionalista Party compensated Zulueta by electing him Senate President.

He became Senator (1951–1957) and was briefly elected the Senate President in 1953. Due to Zulueta's opportunistic behavior affecting the power balance in the senate, he was induced to step down from the senate presidency in favor of Eulogio Rodriguez.

In mid-September 1953, he rejoined the Liberal Party.

=== Later political career ===
Zulueta in 1959 was elected governor of his native province of Iloilo. Later, he was from 1969 to 1972 again delegate on behalf of the first constituency of Iloilo.

During the Marcos administration, he was made the Presidential Consultant on Local Government. In November 1967, he began campaigning for the reelection of president Marcos in the 1969 presidential election.

He is among the few Filipinos included in the World Biography, 1948 edition and in the International Who's Who, 1952 edition.

== Personal life and legacy ==
Zulueta was married to Soledad B. Ramos. His brother, Francisco Zulueta, also served as a Senator. A major road called J.C. Zulueta St. in Oton, Iloilo is named after him.
