= Secretary of the Interior and Local Government =

Cabinet position in the Philippine government

- Kalihim ng Interyor at Pamahalaang Lokal
- Official seal of the Department of the Interior and Local Government

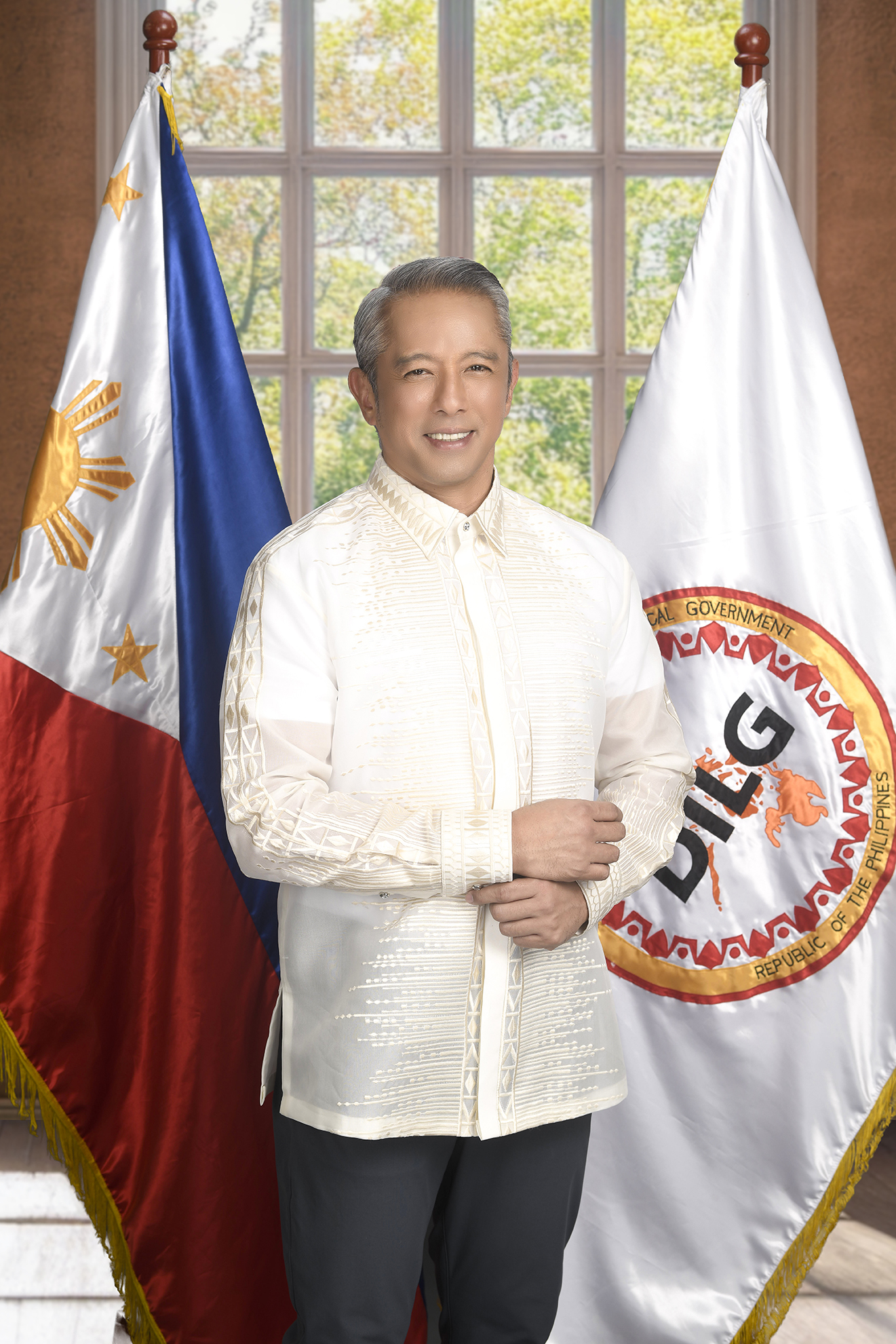
- Incumbent; Jonvic Remulla since October 8, 2024
- Style: The Honorable
- Member of: Cabinet, National Security Council
- Appointer: The president with the consent of the Commission on Appointments
- Term length: At the president's pleasure
- Inaugural holder: Pascual Alvarez
- Formation: March 22, 1897
- Website: www.dilg.gov.ph

The secretary of the interior and local government (Filipino: Kalihim ng Interyor at Pamahalaang Lokal) is the member of the Cabinet in charge of the Department of the Interior and Local Government.

The seat of the secretary of the interior and local government is currently held by Jonvic Remulla since 2024.

== Powers and functions ==
- Assist the president in the exercise of general supervision over local governments;
- Advise the president in the promulgation of policies, rules, regulations and other issuances on the general supervision over local governments and on public order and safety;
- Establish and prescribe rules, regulations and other issuances implementing laws on public order and safety, the general supervision over local governments and the promotion of local autonomy and community empowerment and monitor compliance thereof;
- Provide assistance towards legislation regarding local governments, law enforcement and public safety; Establish and prescribe plans, policies, programs and projects to promote peace and order, ensure public safety and further strengthen the administrative, technical and fiscal capabilities of local government offices and personnel;
- Formulate plans, policies and programs which will meet local emergencies arising from natural and man-made disasters; Establish a system of coordination and cooperation among the citizenry, local executives and the department, to ensure effective and efficient delivery of basic services to the public;
- Organize, train and equip primarily for the performance of police functions, a police force that is national in scope and civilian in character.

== List ==
=== Director of the Interior (1897) ===
	Portrait	Name (Birth–Death)	Took office	Left office	President
1		Pascual Álvarez (1861–1923)	April 24, 1897	October 31, 1897	Emilio Aguinaldo

=== Secretary of the Interior (1897) ===
	Portrait	Name (Birth–Death)	Took office	Left office	President
2		Isabelo Artacho	November 1, 1897	December 15, 1897	Emilio Aguinaldo

=== Secretary of the Interior (1898–1899) ===
	Portrait	Name (Birth–Death)	Took office	Left office	President
3		Leandro Ibarra	June 23, 1898	December; 1898	Emilio Aguinaldo
4		Teodoro Sandiko (1860–1939)	January 21, 1899	May 7, 1899	Emilio Aguinaldo
5		Severino de las Alas	May 7, 1899	November 13, 1899	Emilio Aguinaldo

=== Secretary of the Interior (1901–1935) ===
	Portrait	Name (Birth–Death)	Took office	Left office	Governor-General
6		Dean Conant Worcester (1866–1924)	September 6, 1901	September 15, 1913	William Howard Taft
6		Dean Conant Worcester (1866–1924)	September 6, 1901	September 15, 1913	Luke Edward Wright
6		Dean Conant Worcester (1866–1924)	September 6, 1901	September 15, 1913	Henry Clay Ide
6		Dean Conant Worcester (1866–1924)	September 6, 1901	September 15, 1913	James Francis Smith
6		Dean Conant Worcester (1866–1924)	September 6, 1901	September 15, 1913	William Cameron Forbes
6		Dean Conant Worcester (1866–1924)	September 6, 1901	September 15, 1913	Newton W. Gilbert
7		Winfred Thaxter Denison (1873–1919)	January 27, 1914	March 3, 1916	Francis Burton Harrison
8		Rafael Palma (1874–1939)	January 11, 1917	July 7, 1920	Francis Burton Harrison
9		Teodoro Kalaw (1884–1940)	July 7, 1920	December 31, 1922	Francis Burton Harrison
9		Teodoro Kalaw (1884–1940)	July 7, 1920	December 31, 1922	Charles Yeater
9		Teodoro Kalaw (1884–1940)	July 7, 1920	December 31, 1922	Leonard Wood
10		Jose P. Laurel (1891–1959)	February 9, 1923	July 17, 1923	Leonard Wood
11		Felipe Agoncillo (1859–1941)	July 18, 1923	October 1, 1925	Leonard Wood
12		Honorio Ventura	October 1, 1925	January 16, 1933	Leonard Wood
12		Honorio Ventura	October 1, 1925	January 16, 1933	Eugene Allen Gilmore
12		Honorio Ventura	October 1, 1925	January 16, 1933	Henry L. Stimson
12		Honorio Ventura	October 1, 1925	January 16, 1933	Eugene Allen Gilmore
12		Honorio Ventura	October 1, 1925	January 16, 1933	Dwight F. Davis
12		Honorio Ventura	October 1, 1925	January 16, 1933	George C. Butte
12		Honorio Ventura	October 1, 1925	January 16, 1933	Theodore Roosevelt Jr.
13		Teófilo Sison (1850–1975)	January 16, 1933	November 15, 1935	Theodore Roosevelt Jr.
13		Teófilo Sison (1850–1975)	January 16, 1933	November 15, 1935	Frank Murphy

=== Secretary of the Interior (1935–1941) ===
	Portrait	Name (Birth–Death)	Took office	Left office	President
13		Teófilo Sison (1850–1975)	November 15, 1935	February 5, 1936	Manuel L. Quezon
14		Elpidio Quirino (1890–1956)	February 8, 1936	September 27, 1938	Manuel L. Quezon
15		Rafael Alunan Sr. (1885–1947)	November 16, 1938	August 29, 1941	Manuel L. Quezon
16		Francisco Zulueta (1891–1947)	August 29, 1941	December 22, 1941	Manuel L. Quezon

=== Commissioner of the Interior (1942–1943) ===
	Portrait	Name (Birth–Death)	Took office	Left office	Chairman of the Philippine Executive Commission
17		Benigno Aquino Sr. (1894–1947)	January 26, 1942	December 4, 1942	Jorge B. Vargas
10		Jose P. Laurel (1891–1959)	December 4, 1942	October 14, 1943	Jorge B. Vargas

=== Minister of the Interior (1943–1944) ===
	Portrait	Name (Birth–Death)	Took office	Left office	President
10		Jose P. Laurel (Note: In concurrent capacity as the President.) (1891–1959)	October 14, 1943	January 1, 1944	Jose P. Laurel

=== Minister of Home Affairs (1944–1945) ===
	Portrait	Name (Birth–Death)	Took office	Left office	President
10		Jose P. Laurel (1891–1959)	January 1, 1944	August 24, 1944	Jose P. Laurel
13		Teófilo Sison (1850–1975)	August 24, 1944	1945	Jose P. Laurel

=== Secretary of the Interior (1945–1950) ===
	Portrait	Name (Birth–Death)	Took office	Left office	President
18		Tomás Confesor (1891–1951)	March 8, 1945	July 10, 1945	Sergio Osmeña
19		Alfredo Montelibano Sr. (1905–1989)	July 11, 1945	May 27, 1946	Sergio Osmeña
20		Jose Zulueta (1889–1972)	May 28, 1946	April 17, 1948	Manuel Roxas
21		Sotero Baluyut (1889–1975)	September 21, 1948	December 22, 1950	Elpidio Quirino

=== Secretary of Local Government and Community Development (1972–1978) ===
	Portrait	Name (Birth–Death)	Took office	Left office	President
22		Jose Roño (1923–2002)	January 1, 1973	June 2, 1978	Ferdinand Marcos

=== Minister of Local Government and Community Development (1978–1982) ===
	Portrait	Name (Birth–Death)	Took office	Left office	President
22		Jose Roño (1923–2002)	June 2, 1978	February 28, 1982	Ferdinand Marcos

=== Minister of Local Government (1982–1987) ===
	Portrait	Name (Birth–Death)	Took office	Left office	President
22		Jose Roño (1923–2002)	February 28, 1982	February 25, 1986	Ferdinand Marcos
23		Nene Pimentel (1933–2019)	February 25, 1986	December 7, 1986	Corazon Aquino

=== Secretary of Local Government (1987–1990) ===
	Portrait	Name (Birth–Death)	Took office	Left office	President
24		Jaime Ferrer (1916–1987)	December 8, 1986	August 2, 1987 (Note: Died in office.)	Corazon Aquino
		Lito Monico Lorenzana; Acting	August 3, 1987	November 8, 1987	Corazon Aquino
25		Luis T. Santos	November 9, 1987	December 13, 1990	Corazon Aquino

=== Secretary of the Interior and Local Government (from 1990) ===
	Portrait	Name (Birth–Death)	Took office	Left office	President
25		Luis T. Santos	December 13, 1990	December 10, 1991	Corazon Aquino
26		Cesar Sarino	December 11, 1991	June 30, 1992	Corazon Aquino
27		Rafael Alunan III (born 1948)	June 30, 1992	April 16, 1996	Fidel V. Ramos
28		Robert Barbers (1944–2005)	April 16, 1996	February 4, 1998	Fidel V. Ramos
29		Epimaco Velasco (1935–2014)	February 4, 1998	May 30, 1998	Fidel V. Ramos
		Sonny Collantes (born 1952); Officer in Charge	June 1, 1998	June 30, 1998	Fidel V. Ramos
30		Joseph Estrada (born 1937)	June 30, 1998	April 12, 1999	Joseph Estrada
31		Ronaldo Puno (born 1948)	April 12, 1999	January 10, 2000	Joseph Estrada
32		Alfredo Lim (1929–2020)	January 10, 2000	January 20, 2001	Joseph Estrada
		Anselmo Avelino Jr. Officer in Charge	January 20, 2001	January 28, 2001	Gloria Macapagal Arroyo
33		Joey Lina (born 1951)	January 29, 2001	July 11, 2004	Gloria Macapagal Arroyo
34		Angelo Reyes (1945–2011)	July 12, 2004	February 16, 2006	Gloria Macapagal Arroyo
31		Ronaldo Puno (born 1948)	April 4, 2006	June 30, 2010	Gloria Macapagal Arroyo
		Benigno Aquino III (1960–2021); Officer in Charge	June 30, 2010	July 9, 2010	Benigno Aquino III
35		Jesse Robredo (1958–2012)	July 9, 2010	August 18, 2012	Benigno Aquino III
		Paquito Ochoa Jr. (born 1960); Officer in Charge	August 19, 2012	September 19, 2012	Benigno Aquino III
36		Mar Roxas (born 1957)	September 20, 2012	September 11, 2015	Benigno Aquino III
37		Mel Senen Sarmiento (born 1962)	September 14, 2015	June 30, 2016	Benigno Aquino III
38		Ismael Sueno (born 1947/1948)	June 30, 2016	April 4, 2017	Rodrigo Duterte
		Catalino Cuy (born 1957); Officer in Charge	April 5, 2017	January 4, 2018	Rodrigo Duterte
39		Eduardo Año (Note: Eduardo Año served in the capacity of an Officer in Charge from January 5 until November 6, 2018.) (born 1961)	January 5, 2018	November 6, 2018	Rodrigo Duterte
39		Eduardo Año (born 1961)	November 6, 2018	June 30, 2022	Rodrigo Duterte
40		Benhur Abalos (born 1962)	June 30, 2022	October 7, 2024	Bongbong Marcos
41		Jonvic Remulla (born 1967)	October 8, 2024	Incumbent	Bongbong Marcos
