= Pindolonan National High School =

Public high school in Lanao del Sur, Philippines

Location
- Butig, Lanao del Sur; Philippines
- Coordinates: 7°44′07″N 124°17′36″E

Information
- Established: 2002

Pindolonan National High School is a high school located at the center of the Municipality of Butig, Province of Lanao del Sur, in the Barangay Pindolonan, Philippines. It has 15,000 square meters land area duly donated by late Municipal Councilor, Datu Ditual Bundas Maliwanag. The area is bounded at east by the Sawa River, west by Lake Butig, north by Sultan Dimnatang Ditual and south by Macabago Canapi.

== History ==
Pindolonan National High School was started sometimes on 1998 when the Municipality of Butig goes on crises. Butig National High School disrupted its operation due to heavy opposing family feud during the local election, Pindolonan became the sanctuary of teachers and students to pursue their classes thereon.

The school applied its independence of the same year through the joint Barangay Resolution of the Barangay Councils of the three adjacent Barangay known as Barangay Malungun, Barangay Sundig and Barangay Pindolonan under Barangay Resolution No.3, s. 1998 and duly endorsed thru Municipal Resolution of the Municipal Council of Butig under Municipal Resolution No. 18, s. 1998 but only realized its legal basis on September 30, 2002, at the DepEd Central Office signed and approved by the former DepEd National Secretary Edilberto de Jesus.

== Buildings ==
The school has three permanent buildings through the initiative of Hon. Benasing O. Macarambon, Jr., Former Congressman of Second District of Lanao del Sur, one Cover Court through the assistance of Dr. Pasayud M. Macarambon, Vice President for Mindanao, National Power Corporation, one permanent school stage through the initiative of former Vice Mayor of Butig, Hadja Sittie Faizah Bao-Macabuntal Ditual and one computer laboratory with complete units thru the recommendation of Dr. Zenaida P. Ampatua, Al-hadja, the school's Division Superintendent of Lanao del Sur II.

== Staff ==
The school has fourteen regular secondary school teachers, one secondary school principal, and four contractual teachers funded by the Municipal Government of Butig. It has an enough enrollment regularly attending their classes.

The operation of the school that which is not seen but public knowledge of its assistance, the previous and present administration in solving a part of irradiation of students stoppage, there were so many affairs like the community assembly, Foundation Day and others attended by various key officials. On the occasion of the commencement exercises which were attended by the following key officials:

1. AY 2003-2004 - Dr. Mahid M. Mutilan, Regional Vice Governor and Regional Secretary, DepEd - ARMM and Hon. Benasing O. Macarambon,. Jr., Congressman of the Second District of Lanao del Sur;

2. AY 2004-2005 - Hon. Benasing O. Macarambon, Jr., Congressman of Second District of Lanao del Sur and Dr. Somerado M. Pandapatan, Administrative Officer of the Division of Lanao del Sur II;

3. AY 2005-2006 - Hon. Usman Sarangani, Assemblyman, Second District of Lanao del Sur and Datu Abdul Faffar C. Ali, Chief of Staff, Congressman Macarambon;

4. AY 2006-2007 - Hon. Hadja Sittie Faizah BM Ditual, Municipal Mayor of Butig Municipality;

5. AY 2007-2008 - Dr. Pasayud M. Macarambon, Vice President for Mindanao, National Power Corporation;

6. AY 2008-2009 - Dr. Zenaida P. Ampatua, Al-hadja, Schools Division Superintendent, Lanao del Sur II;

7. AY 2009-2010 - Hon. Benasing O. Macarambon, Jr. Former Congressman of Second District of Lanao del Sur;

8. AY 2010-2011 - Dr. Pendi M. Ibrahim, General Education Supervisor, Division Madaris Coordinator;

9. AY 2011-2012 - Hon. Ibrahim M. Macadato, Al-Hadj, Municipal Mayor of Butig Municipality and Bae Zenaida B. Amanodin, Division Education Supervisor.

Pindolonan National High School has strong linkages with each other because of its existing different organizations like the Parents, Teachers and Community Association (PTCA), the School Governing Councils (SSC) and above all the Local Government Unit of the Municipality Butig are extending their full support for effective operation of the school.
