= Isaac Lacson =

Filipino lawyer, politician, diplomat

The Honourable Isaac Lacson
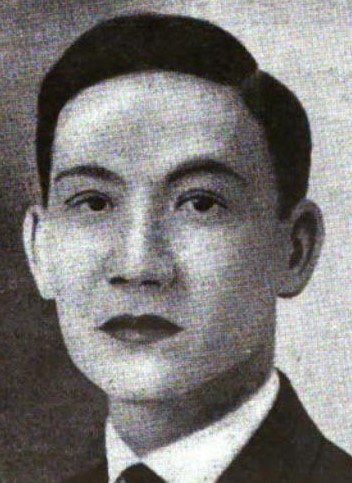
- Senatorial portrait of Lacson, published by Benipayo Press, c. 1935

Senator of the Philippines from the 8th District
- In office 5 June 1934 – 16 September 1935 Serving with Gil Montilla
- Preceded by: Francisco Zulueta
- Succeeded by: office abolished

Member of the House of Representatives from Negros Occidental's 3rd district
- In office 2 June 1925 – 5 June 1928
- Preceded by: Eliseo Limsiaco
- Succeeded by: Emilio Montilla

12th Governor of Negros Occidental
- In office 16 October 1931 – 12 July 1934
- Preceded by: Agustin Ramos
- Succeeded by: Ramon Severino

Personal details
- Born: July 28, 1889 Talisay, Negros Occidental, Captaincy General of the Philippines
- Died: October 4, 1964 (aged 75)
- Party: Nacionalista

Isaac Araneta Lacson (28 July 1889 - 4 October 1964) was a Filipino politician who served as the Governor of Negros Occidental during the American occupation.

== Early life and education ==
Lacson was born on July 28, 1889 in Talisay, Negros Occidental to General Aniceto Lacson, a revolutionary hero who then served as the President of the short lived Republic of Negros during the Philippine Revolution, and Rosario Araneta, a matron of the Araneta clan of the Philippines.

He attended the Ateneo de Manila and graduated in 1910 from the San Juan de Letran College with a Bachelor of Arts degree.

== Political career ==
In 1925, he was elected to the House of Representatives representing the 3rd district of Negros Occidental, serving until 1928. He then became Governor of Negros Occidental from 1931 to 1934, when he was elected to the Philippine Senate as the representative of the 8th senatorial district composed of the Negros provinces, Antique and Palawan. He served in the Senate until its abolition in 1935. As a senator, he served as chairman of the committees on banks and corporations and franchises.
