= Espiridion Guanco =

Filipino politician

The Honorable Espiridión Guanco
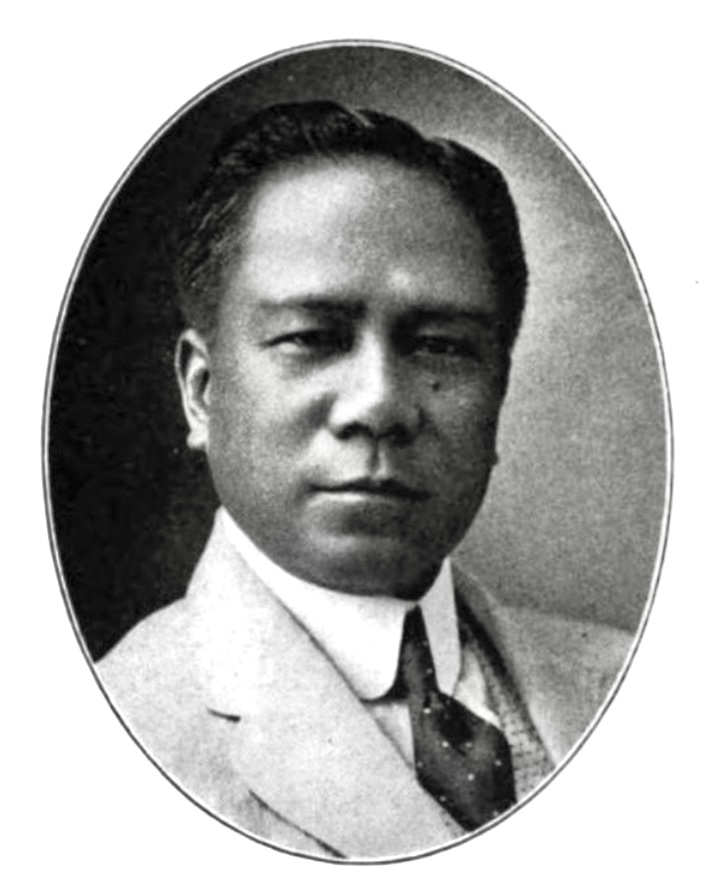
- Guanco in c. 1917

Senator of the Philippines from the 8th District
- In office October 16, 1916 – May 2, 1925 Serving with Manuel López; Hermenegildo Villanueva
- Preceded by: office established
- Succeeded by: Mariano Yulo

President pro tempore of the Senate of the Philippines
- In office c. 1919 – October 27, 1922
- Preceded by: Rafael Palma
- Succeeded by: Sergio Osmeña

Member of the Philippine Assembly from Iloilo's 4th district
- In office October 16, 1909 – October 16, 1912
- Preceded by: Adriano Hernández y Dayot
- Succeeded by: Amando Avanceña

Personal details
- Born: December 29, 1874 Pototan, Iloilo, Captaincy General of the Philippines
- Died: May 2, 1925 (aged 50) Manila, Philippine Islands
- Cause of death: Cerebral attack
- Party: Nacionalista (1909-1925)

Espiridión Guanco y Cordero (29 December 1874 - 2 May 1925) was a Filipino politician during the American occupation. While serving as senator, he was the Secretary to the Senate President Manuel L. Quezon.

During the 1910s, Guanco lobbied the Philippine Legisture for the establishment of a national bank. This was to protect farmers in Negros Occidental. His advocacy for agricultural development continued as a senator. He died in 1925 due to a cerebral attack.

== Biography ==
Guanco was born on 29 December 1874 to Agustin Guanco and Filomena Cordero in Pototan, Iloilo. He entered the seminary in Jaro at age seven. He then studied law and later worked as a teacher in a small village in Hinigaran, Negros Occidental. However, the Philippine Revolution against Spanish control began. During this event, Guanco joined the uprising in Hinigaran.

After the revolution, he became a lawyer in 1900 and returned to Iloilo. He made his law office there. Along with his career as a lawyer, he also dedicated himself to teaching and became a faculty member of the Molo Institute, a Filipino school established by Ilonggo intellectuals. He co-founded the Filipino newspaper, El Pais, over which the publication campaigned against the Americans.

Guanco also managed a sugar mill in Hinigaran. He also owned a sugar plantation near Binalbagan, which was merged in 1920 with the Binalbagan sugar central run by the Whitiker Company, over which he was vice-president.

=== Philippine Legislature ===
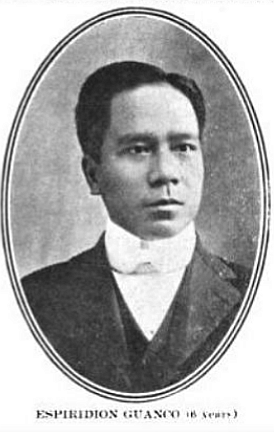
Guanco as a senator, from the Philippine Education, published c. 1917

He was first elected to the Philippine Assembly as the representative of the 4th district of Iloilo from 1909 to 1912. As a member of the Philippine Assembly, he was appointed by the Speaker for the chairmanship of the irrigation committee.

==== Establishment of a national bank ====
During the 1910s, farmers in Negros Occidental were alarmed by the potential delay in the establishment of a national bank. Guanco, who used to serve as president of the first agricultural congress, feared this would lead to severe financial consequences, including the withdrawal of government funds consisting of two million pesos and the cessation of credit from British banks due to World War I. To address this, the farmers sent representatives, which include Guanco, to Manila and lobby for the immediate passage of the national bank bill.

==== As senator ====
Upon the establishment of the Philippine Senate in 1916, he was elected as the first representative of the 8th senatorial district composed of the Negros provinces, Antique and Palawan. In 1917, he became Secretary to the Senate President Manuel L. Quezon. He also became a member of the Senate committees on Agriculture and Natural Resources, Elections and Privileges, Finance, and Relations with the Sovereign Country. During this period, he served as the chamber's President pro tempore during the 5th Legislature until 1922. He served three terms until his death in office on 2 May 1925.

As a senator, Guanco advocated for the development of agriculture as a source of wealth in the Philippine Islands.

== Death and legacy ==
On 2 May 1925, Guanco died at the Philippine General Hospital in Manila because of a cerebral attack.

A bridge in Hinigaran was named after him. The bridge was set for demolition by the Department of Public Works and Highways in 2018.
