= Philippines's 8th senatorial district =

- Former constituency for the Senate of the Philippines
- Provinces / Cities: Antique, Negros Occidental, Negros Oriental, Palawan
- Population: 1,124,197 (1935)
- Electorate: 153,706 (1935)

Former constituency
- Created: 1916
- Abolished: 1934

Philippines's 8th senatorial district, officially the Eighth Senatorial District of the Philippine Islands (Spanish: Octavo Distrito Senatorial de las Islas Filipinas), was one of the twelve senatorial districts of the Philippines in existence between 1916 and 1935. It elected two members to the Senate of the Philippines, the upper chamber of the bicameral Philippine Legislature under the Insular Government of the Philippine Islands for each of the 4th to 10th legislatures. The district was created under the 1916 Jones Law from the western Visayas provinces of Antique, Negros Occidental, Negros Oriental and Palawan.

The district was represented by a total of seven senators throughout its existence. It was abolished in 1935 when a unicameral National Assembly was installed under a new constitution following the passage of the Tydings–McDuffie Act which established the Commonwealth of the Philippines. Since the 1941 elections when the Senate was restored after a constitutional plebiscite, all twenty-four members of the upper house have been elected countrywide at-large. It was last represented by Gil Montilla and Isaac Lacson of the Nacionalista Democrático.

== List of senators ==
| Seat A | | | | | | | Legislature | Seat B | | | | | | |
| # | Image | Senator | Term of office | | Party | Electoral history | Legislature | # | Image | Senator | Term of office | | Party | Electoral history |
| # | Image | Senator | Start | End | Party | Electoral history | Legislature | # | Image | Senator | Start | End | Party | Electoral history |
| 1 | | Espiridion Guanco | October 16, 1916 | May 2, 1925 | Nacionalista | Elected in 1916. | 4th | 1 | | Manuel López | October 16, 1916 | June 3, 1919 | Nacionalista | Elected in 1916. |
| 1 | | Espiridion Guanco | October 16, 1916 | May 2, 1925 | Nacionalista | Elected in 1916. | 5th | 2 | | Hermenegildo Villanueva | June 3, 1919 | June 2, 1931 | Nacionalista | Elected in 1919. |
| 1 | | Espiridion Guanco | October 16, 1916 | May 2, 1925 | Nacionalista; Colectivista | Re-elected in 1922. Died. | 6th | 2 | | Hermenegildo Villanueva | June 3, 1919 | June 2, 1931 | Nacionalista; Colectivista | Elected in 1919. |
| 2 | | Mariano Yulo | August 31, 1925 | July 11, 1929 | Nacionalista; Consolidado | Elected to finish Guanco's term. | 7th | 2 | | Hermenegildo Villanueva | June 3, 1919 | June 2, 1931 | Nacionalista; Consolidado | Re-elected in 1925. |
| 2 | | Mariano Yulo | August 31, 1925 | July 11, 1929 | Nacionalista; Consolidado | Re-elected in 1928. Died. | 8th | 2 | | Hermenegildo Villanueva | June 3, 1919 | June 2, 1931 | Nacionalista; Consolidado | Re-elected in 1925. |
| 3 | | Francisco Zulueta | September 18, 1929 | June 5, 1934 | Nacionalista; Consolidado | Elected to finish Yulo's term. | 8th | 2 | | Hermenegildo Villanueva | June 3, 1919 | June 2, 1931 | Nacionalista; Consolidado | Re-elected in 1925. |
| 3 | | Francisco Zulueta | September 18, 1929 | June 5, 1934 | Nacionalista; Consolidado | Elected to finish Yulo's term. | 9th | 3 | | Gil Montilla | June 2, 1931 | September 16, 1935 | Nacionalista; Consolidado | Elected in 1931. |
| 4 | | Isaac Lacson | June 5, 1934 | September 16, 1935 | Nacionalista; Democrático | Elected in 1934. | 10th | 3 | | Gil Montilla | June 2, 1931 | September 16, 1935 | Nacionalista; Democrático | Elected in 1931. |

== See also ==
- Senatorial districts of the Philippines
