= Mariano Yulo =

Filipino doctor and politician

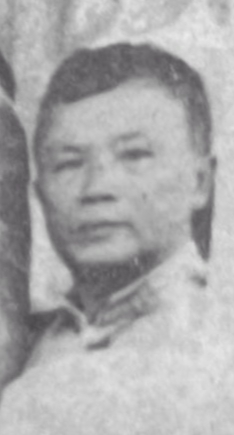
- Yulo in 1925

Senator of the Philippines from the 8th District
- In office 31 August 1925 – 11 July 1929 Serving with Hermenegildo Villanueva
- Preceded by: Espiridion Guanco
- Succeeded by: Francisco Zulueta

6th Governor of Negros Occidental
- In office 8 March 1908 – 15 October 1912
- Preceded by: Manuel Lopez
- Succeeded by: Matias Hilado

Personal details
- Born: Mariano Yulo y Regalado; September 3, 1873 Hinigaran, Negros Occidental, Captaincy General of the Philippines
- Died: July 11, 1929 (aged 55) Hinigaran, Negros Occidental, Philippine Islands
- Party: Nacionalista

Mariano Regalado Yulo (born Mariano Yulo y Regalado; September 3, 1873 – July 11, 1929) was a Filipino physician and politician. Yulo served as a member of the Senate of the Philippines from 1925 to 1929.

== Biography ==
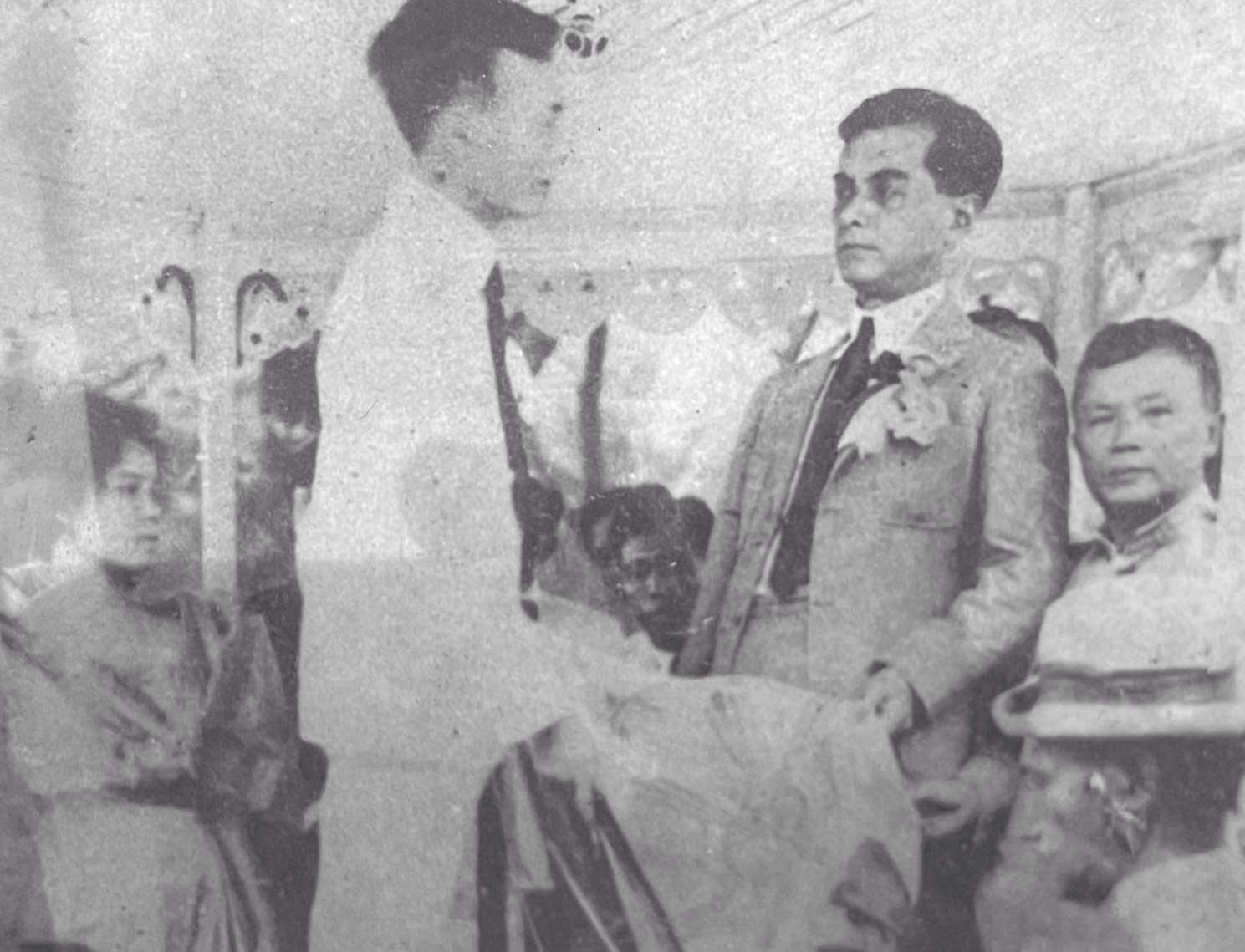
Yulo (right of Quezon) with Senate President Manuel L. Quezon (right of the image) and Governor Jose Locsin (left of the image) during the 1925 campaign for Philippine independence

Mariano Yulo was born on September 3, 1873, in Hinigaran, Negros Occidental to Teodoro Yulo and Gregoria Regalado. Yulo completed an education at the Colegio de San Juan de Letran. He then followed medical training at the San Juan de Dios Hospital and graduated in 1898 with his Doctor of Medicine from the University of Santo Tomas. During the Philippine Revolution, he worked as a doctor in the military hospital in Manila. During Philippine-American War, he was active as a doctor in Binalbagan. He was also one of the members of the Malolos Congress.

After the American victory, Yulo was a member of the provincial board of Negros Occidental and president of the provincial health board from 1902. In 1908 he was elected governor of Negros Occidental and served until 1912. In 1925, Yulo was elected to the Senate of the Philippines on behalf of the 8th District after a special election to succeed Espiridion Guanco, who died in office. He was re-elected in 1928.

On July 8, 1929, Yulo was injured in a serious car accident in Hinigaran and died on July 11 in his hometown at the age of 55. On July 16, Senator Hermenegildo Villanueva appointed a committee to represent the Senate in Yulo's funeral. The senate session was also adjourned that same day declaring it as a day of mourning for the late senator. In a special election for his seat, Francisco Zulueta was elected unopposed to complete the remainder of Yulo's term.

His son, Alfredo Yulo, served as mayor of Bacolod from 1940 to 1942.

=== Sugar milling ===
Yulo was one of the sugar millers who held positions in the US colonial government. However due to an economic crisis in 1919 and rising costs, the Yulo family gave up management of the sugar central they founded in Binalbagan to an American, Philip Whitiker. Whitiker acquired a major interest with credit from the Philippine National Bank (PNB) and gave its president Venancio Concepcion over ₱600,000 (equivalent to ₱119,682,396 in 2021) in stock. Senator Espiridion Guanco was vice-president when Binalbagan estate owed ₱12,000,000 (equivalent to ₱2,393,647,913 in 2021). The credit pyramid collapsed, and the PNB took over ownership of the plant under a new president due to problematic management.

== Legacy ==
Yulo's two-story house and garden built in 1919, also known as Yulo's Park, has been declared as an "important cultural heritage" by the National Museum of the Philippines and installed a national historical marker there in 2024.
