= Rafael Alunan III =

Filipino businessman and former government official

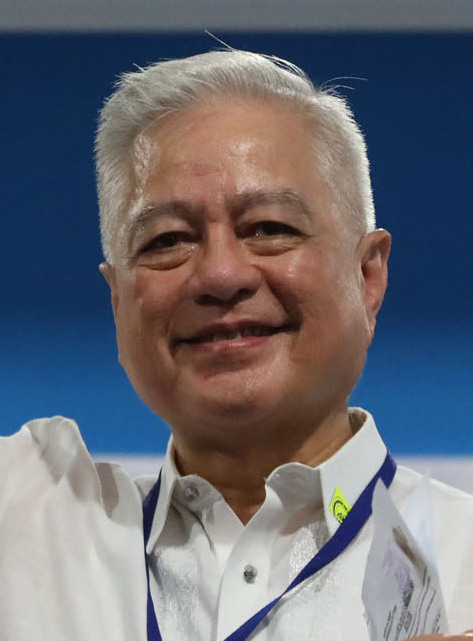
- Alunan in 2018

Secretary of the Interior and Local Government
- In office July 1, 1992 – April 15, 1996
- President: Fidel V. Ramos
- Preceded by: Cesar Sarino
- Succeeded by: Robert Barbers

Secretary of Tourism
- In office January 9, 1991 – February 16, 1992
- President: Corazon Aquino
- Preceded by: Peter Garrucho
- Succeeded by: Narzalina Lim

Personal details
- Born: Rafael Moreno Alunan III; May 17, 1948 (age 78) Manila, Philippines
- Party: Bagumbayan (2018–present)
- Other political affiliations: Independent (until 2018)
- Spouse: Elizabeth Alunan
- Education: De La Salle University (BA, MBA); Harvard University (MPA)

Rafael "Raffy" Moreno Alunan III (born May 17, 1948) is a Filipino businessman and former government official. He is a former Tourism and Interior and Local Government Secretary of the Philippines.

== Education ==
Rafael Alunan III was born on May 17, 1948, in Manila and raised in Bacolod. He graduated secondary school at La Salle College - Bacolod and attended De La Salle University where he graduated with bachelor's degrees in political science and business administration in 1970. He also attended the Ateneo de Manila University under its MBA Senior Executive Program from 1980 to 1981. He entered the John F. Kennedy School of Government of the Harvard University in the United States, acquiring a master's degree in public administration in 1997. He also attended the Command and General Staff College of the Philippine Army in 2002.

== Career ==
=== Government ===
Rafael Alunan III served as Secretary of the Department of Tourism (DOT) from January 9, 1991, to February 16, 1992, under President Corazon Aquino and as Secretary of the Department of the Interior and Local Government (DILG) from July 1, 1992, to April 15, 1996, under President Fidel V. Ramos.

As Interior Secretary, Alunan initiated Oplan Paglalansag, a measure against private armies. Under that initiative, a politician having more than two personal armed guards would be considered as having a private army and such groups could be dissolved. Oplan Paglalansag also sought the recovery of unauthorized firearms across the country. This policy would later be known as the Alunan doctrine.

Alunan ran for Senator in the 2016 election and was supported by then-presidential candidate Rodrigo Duterte but failed to get elected after placing 26th. Duterte advised against Alunan running again in the 2019 elections and offered his appointment to the DILG as Secretary.

Alunan declined and became a guest candidate of PDP-Laban, Duterte's party during the 2019 elections. He ran under the Bagumbayan Party. His second Senate bid also failed.

=== Other ===
Alunan was also part of the Manindigan as a trustee, an organization of academics, entrepreneurs, and professionals which launched protests against the presidency of Ferdinand Marcos in the 1980s.

He also served as board chairman of the Philippine Council for Foreign Relations and the independent director of Pepsi-Cola Products Philippines.

Amidst the COVID-19 pandemic, Alunan promoted ivermectin as an alternative to the COVID-19 vaccine through a post that the drug was approved only as a antinematodal agent by the Philippine Food and Drug Administration rather as a treatment for COVID-19.

== Personal life ==
Alunan is married to Elizabeth Alunan.They have no children.
