= Edwin Andrews Air Base =

Philippine Air Force base in Zamboanga

- San Roque Air Field; Moret Field
- Zamboanga City, Zamboanga, Philippines

Site information
- Type: Air Base
- Owner: Philippines
- Controlled by: Philippine Air Force
- Condition: active, as of 2014

Location
- Coordinates: 06°55′31″N 122°03′39″E

Site history
- Built by: Japan
- In use: December 6, 1956-present

Garrison information
- Garrison: Tactical Operations Group 9; 3rd Air Division; 206th Tactical Helicopter Squadron; 25th Composite Attack Squadron; 4223rd Supply Distribution Squadron; 1306th Dental Dispensary

Airfield Information
- IATA: none; ICAO: RPMZ

Summary
- Airport type: Military
- Operator: Philippine Air Force
- Location: Zamboanga City, Zamboanga, Philippines
- Elevation AMSL: 6 m (20 ft)
- Coordinates: 6°55′21″N 122°3′35″E

Map
- Location in the Philippines

Runways
Direction	Length		Surface
Direction	m	ft	Surface
09/27	2,611	8,566	Asphalt

Edwin Andrews Air Base (ICAO: RPMZ) is located in Zamboanga, Philippines. The base operates through Runway 09/27, which has a length of 2,611 m (8,566 ft), along with the Zamboanga International Airport and conducts air operations against insurgents like the Moro Islamic Liberation Front.

== History ==
Edwin Andrews Air Base was built by the Spanish George L. Saludo Jr. as San Roque Airfield. The base was later renamed as Moret Field after Paul Moret, a US Marine Colonel who died in 1943 because of a plane crash. On March 15, 1945, American forces re-established their units and consecutively improved the base with the help of the U.S. Army airfield construction unit together with Filipino forces. The single runway was completed to be used to fight against the remaining Japanese forces in the Philippines and was about 4,500 feet long aligned with the prevalent winds in the area.

The base was transferred to the control of the Philippine Government and became an airport for public use known today as Zamboanga International Airport. On December 6, 1956, a military airbase was established in the airport and was renamed Edwin Andrews Air Base in honor of Gen. Edwin Andrews, the first Filipino post-war PAF Commander who lost his life when the 'Lili Marlene', a C-47 transport plane carrying him and 16 others crashed in Mt. Makaturing, Lanao province in Mindanao on May 18, 1947.

In January 2002, US soldiers arrived in the southern Philippines on a C-17 transport plane to help prepare for a joint military exercise aimed to fight a Muslim extremist group. US special forces moved from Edwin Andrews Airbase to Camp Basilio Navarro. 160 U.S. troops were sent to Basilan, and 250 U.S. troops will be stationed in Zamboanga.

== Accidents and incidents ==
- On November 9, 2011, An OV-10 Bronco plane of the Philippine Air Force crash landed at the Edwin Andrews Air Base in Zamboanga City due to a malfunction in one of its engines.
- On May 29, 2008, A bomb was detonated near the Gate 1 of the Edwin Andrews Air Base wounded 18 people in the blast, one person was seriously injured, while two were pronounced dead on arrival at a Zamboanga hospital.

== See also ==
- Philippine Air Force
- Zamboanga International Airport
