= Mount Makaturing =

Volcano in Lanao del Sur, Philippines

- Palaw a Magatoring; Bundok Makaturing
- Location within Mindanao mainland Location within Philippines

Highest point
- Elevation: 1,908 m (6,260 ft)
- Listing: Active volcano
- Coordinates: 7°39′N 124°19′E

Geography
- Country: Philippines
- Region: BARMM
- Province: Lanao del Sur
- City/municipality: Butig

Geology
- Mountain type: Stratovolcano
- Volcanic arc: Central Mindanao Arc
- Last eruption: March 18, 1882

Mount Makaturing, also known locally as Palaw a Magatoring, is a stratovolcano on Mindanao island in the Philippines. It is located in the province of Lanao del Sur (particularly in the town of Butig) in the Bangsamoro Autonomous Region in Muslim Mindanao. Makaturing has an elevation of 1,940 metres (6,365 ft) and a base diameter of 29 km (18 mi). It is part of a string of volcanoes called the Central Mindanao Arc.

The Smithsonian Institution's Global Volcanology Program, citing the Catalog of Active Volcanoes of the World (Neumann van Padang, 1953), suggests that some eruptions were actually those of neighboring Ragang volcano.

Makaturing is one of the active volcanoes in the Philippines. All are part of the Pacific Ring of Fire.

== Historical events ==
On May 18, 1947, Philippine Air Force (PAF) commander Gen. Edwin Andrews died with 16 others when the C-47 transport plane, named 'Lili Marlene' carrying them crashed in Makaturing along with Senator Francisco C. Zulueta. Nine years later, the PAF established an air base in Zamboanga City, which is now named the Edwin Andrews Air Base from where the Philippine military launches air support operations in the ongoing campaign against separatists.

== See also ==
- List of volcanoes in the Philippines
  - List of active volcanoes in the Philippines
  - List of potentially active volcanoes in the Philippines
  - List of inactive volcanoes in the Philippines
- Philippine Institute of Volcanology and Seismology
