= Lyceum of the Philippines – Davao =

Private college in Davao City, Philippines

- Pamantasang Liseo ng Pilipinas sa Davao (Filipino)
- Motto: Veritas et Fortitudo; Pro Deo et Patria (Latin)
- Motto in English: Truth and Fortitude; For God and Country
- Type: Private Non-sectarian, Coeducational Higher education institution
- Parent institution: Lyceum of the Philippines University
- President: Peter P. Laurel
- Location: Km. 11, LPU Drive, C.P. Garcia Highway, Buhangin District, Davao City, Philippines; 7°08′27″N 125°38′49″E
- Campus: 5.2 hectares (52,000 m^{2}) (campus only); Urban
- Colours: Red & gray
- Nickname: Pirates
- Mascot: Pipo the Pirate
- Website: lpudavao.edu.ph
- Location in Mindanao Location in the Philippines

The Lyceum of the Philippines – Davao is a higher education institution located in Buhangin, Davao City. An affiliate campus of the Lyceum of the Philippines University system, the institution is the first LPU campus built outside Luzon. LPU Davao opened its doors and offered baccalaureate degrees and Senior High School in 2019.

== History ==
In March 2017, Lyceum of the Philippines University Batangas and Laguna President Dr. Peter P. Laurel paid a courtesy call during a regular session of the City Council. Laurel unveiled his plans to establish a world-class university in Davao City by 2018, the hometown of LPU alumnus and Philippine President Rodrigo Duterte.

On May 28, 2018, LPU and Cebu Landmasters, Inc. inked a deal to develop a university town in a 17-hectare property near Davao International Airport. The LPU Town Center will feature a convention center, a hotel, condominium units, restaurants, and other business establishments, aside from the university buildings. 5.2 hectares of property is allocated for the campus alone.

LPU Davao held the ceremonial topping-off ceremony of the Jose P. Laurel (JPL) and Sotero H. Laurel (SHL) buildings on October 19, 2018.

LPU Davao opened in June 2019, while classes started in July 2019 for Senior High School (Junior College) and in August 2019 for College.

The first commencement exercise of the Senior High School department was livestreamed on August 14, 2021. The ceremony trended on social media as netizens commended the institution's creativity to deliver a memorable graduation to students amid the COVID-19 pandemic.

== Education program ==
=== Air Academy ===
Beginning April 2022, LPU Davao offers basic and advanced Drone Flight Training classes. It is expected to offer a Cabin Crew Training Program, among other aviation courses, in the near future.

=== College ===
LPU Davao offers various undergraduate degrees under Health Sciences, Business Management and Accounting, Arts and Sciences, and International Tourism and Hospitality Management.

=== International Culinary Institute ===
The LPU Davao International Culinary Institute (ICI) offers a wide array of short- and long-term culinary training programs based on international standards.

=== Junior College ===
LPU Davao offers various Senior High School (SHS) academic tracks for Grades 11 and 12 under the K–12 Basic Education. The SHS department is referred to as Junior College.

== See also ==
- Lyceum of the Philippines University
- Lyceum of the Philippines University–Batangas
- Lyceum of the Philippines University–Laguna
- Lyceum of the Philippines University–Cavite
