= University of Mindanao =

Private university in Davao City, Philippines

- Pamantasan ng Mindanaw (Tagalog); Kinatumhaan sa Mindanaw (Cebuano)
- Quality, Affordable, Open Education
- Former name: Mindanao Colleges
- Motto: Vincit Omnia Veritas
- Motto in English: Truth Conquers All
- Type: Private, Non-sectarian
- Established: July 27, 1946
- Founders: Guillermo E. Torres, Sr.
- Religious affiliation: Non-sectarian
- Academic affiliations: Philippine Association of Colleges and Universities Commission on Accreditation (PACUCOA); Federation of Accrediting Agencies of the Philippines (FAAP)
- President: Guillermo P. Torres, Jr.
- Principal: Antonio T. Joyno; Basic Education
- Students: ~78,000
- Undergraduates: ~73,000
- Postgraduates: ~3,000
- Doctoral students: ~2,000
- Location: Bolton St, Poblacion District, Davao City, Davao del Sur, Philippines; 7°04′02″N 125°36′34″E
- Campus: Urban Main Campus Bolton St, Poblacion District, Davao City Satellite campuses; Matina Crossing, Davao City; Bangoy Street, Davao City; R. delos Cientos Sr. St., Poblacion Dos, Bansalan, Davao del Sur; Digos, Davao del Sur; Tagum, Davao del Norte; Island Garden City of Samal, Davao del Norte
- Publication: Primum
- Alma Mater song: UM Hymn
- Colors: Maroon and Gold
- Nickname: UMians
- Sporting affiliations: PRISAA DRFA
- Mascot: UM Wildcats / UM Paladin
- Website: umindanao.edu.ph
- Location in Mindanao Location in the Philippines

The University of Mindanao is a private, non-sectarian university in Davao City, Davao del Sur province, on the island of Mindanao, the Philippines. Established in 1946, it has ten branches spread over thirteen campuses in Southern Mindanao. It offers learning opportunities for indigenous education.

In 2023, UM became the third recipient of the Philippine Quality Award for Performance Excellence, the highest national award for organizations that demonstrate "management excellence", from the Department of Trade and Industry.

== History ==
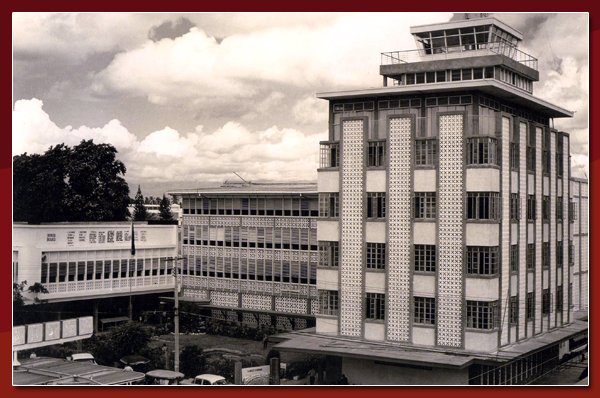
The first Buildings of the University of Mindanao located in Bolton St. Davao City

In the midst of rebuilding the ruins of Davao City brought about by World War II, Atty. Guillermo E. Torres constructed the institution. Mindanao Colleges was incorporated on July 27, 1946. During the first year of operation, classes were held in four rented rooms of the Borgaily Building along San Pedro Street in Davao City. 13 teachers were hired and there were 381 enrollees. Dr. Efigenia C. Occeña was the Acting Coordinator. The permitted courses were originally the six year complete Elementary Course, two-year Secondary Course (1st and 2nd years), two year Elementary Teacher Certificate, two-year Associate in Commercial Science, and two-year Associate in Arts. On April 23, 1948, the institution held its first commencement exercise with 30 graduation and 50 high school students.

To accommodate the increasing number of students, the board of trustees decided to buy Club Royale along Legaspi Street and renovated it to suit classroom requirements. New parcels of land were purchased along Bolton and Bonifacio Street which is the present location of the main campus and Embassy Area, respectively. The university's influence erected more with the establishment of the Mindanao Collegian, the first free campus newspaper in Mindanao. It became the training ground of the Davao newspaper staff.

Foreign linkages were sparked when Atty. Torres left for the United States for a sponsored study tour in May 1955. Ties were formed with the University on the Air (1971); Sister University agreements with the John Dewey International University Consortium of America, New York City and the Fongchia College of Engineering and Business of Taipei, Taiwan.

The Open Education Program in the early 1970s enabled the institution to help the poor but deserving college undergraduates employed in the business and factory sites and self-employed to earn a college education. From being Mindanao Colleges in Bolton, it blossomed into the University of Mindanao on December 21, 1966, and has spawned ten more branches to the outlying province in 1948 in Digos, Bangoy, Peñaplata, Tagum (1950), Guianga (1952), Ilang-Tibungco (1951), Panabo (1951), Bansalan (1962), Cotabato City (1959), Toril, and Matina.

In 2023, UM received the Philippine Quality Award (PQA) for Performance Excellence from the Department of Trade and Industry, the highest possible award for organizations that demonstrate "management excellence by the purposefulness with which it continues to improve and build upon outstanding results and excellent systems", and can "serve as a national and global model". With this, UM became the award's third recipient (and first public organization) in the PQA's two-decade history, after Unilab in 2008 and Toyota Motor Philippines in 2021.

== University of Mindanao seal ==
The official seal of the University of Mindanao was designed to depict the salient information about the institution. The University of Mindanao and the year it was founded, 1946, are inscribed on top and below, respectively inside an outer circle edged with waves. The inner circle has the motto inscribed in Latin words, "Vincit Omnia Veritas", meaning "Truth Conquers All". Over it is two laurel leaf branches symbolizing honor and achievement, framing a vinta on a wavy sea, whose giant sail has the initials of UM, with the horizon behind. This conveys the message "Sail On" or "Move On". In the sky above the horizon are five stars representing the heavenly bodies that influence the destiny of the youth, Hope of the Fatherland.

== Academics ==
The University of Mindanao has more than 10 colleges and schools located in three campuses. The Colleges of Business Administration, Law and the Graduate School are located in Bolton Campus. The Colleges of Arts and Sciences, Nursing, Engineering, Computing, Architecture, Education, Forestry, Accountancy, and Criminology are located in Matina Campus. Technical and vocational courses are located in Bangoy Campus. Each college is supervised by a dean and program heads/instructor coordinator.

Most of its academic programs are accredited by the Philippine Association of Colleges and Universities Commission on Accreditation (PACUCOA) and the Federation of Accrediting Agencies of the Philippines (FAAP)."31". Its Electrical Engineering is the first in the country granted Level III Reaccredited Status. Level III status is the highest accreditation granted by PACUCOA—a seal of excellence and quality in a given academic program."32". Its Architecture Program is the first in the country to be granted Level I Accreditation."33". UM is the first PACUCOA school in Mindanao granted Level III for various academic programs and one of the top five (5) schools in the Philippines with the most number of accreditation."34".

The Commission on Higher Education (CHED) has granted Center of Excellence (COE) and Center of Development (COD) to its various academic programs, having the most number of COEs and CODs in Mindanao. The programs granted with COE are Teacher Education, Criminology, and Business Administration. The programs granted with COD are Accountancy, Computer Engineering, Information Technology, Electrical Engineering and Mechanical Engineering. UM Digos College granted with COD on Information Technology program. UM Tagum College granted with COD on Teacher Education program.

== Student life ==
=== Student scholarships grants and financial assistance ===
The University of Mindanao offers several kinds internal scholarships grants and financial assistance for students who have exemplary performance both in the academic and non-academic fields, as well as those who are underprivileged but deserving students.

- Guillermo E. Torres Scholarship - This scholarship is available to Legal Education and Accountancy students exemplary academic performance and belong to the top five (5) of the department in terms of scholastic average.
- UM Honor Society - The UM Honors Society is an exclusive honor society, established and recognized by the University of Mindanao that is committed to help provide a dynamic and supportive academic environment in the university. Members are academic scholars who are committed to contribute to the development of their field/s of study and who seek to ensure and sustain excellence in their field.
- Academic Scholarships
- Student's Assistant Program Scholarship (STAP)
- Cultural Art Scholarship - The University of Mindanao supports the preservation and promotion of the rich Filipino cultural heritage through music, performing arts, band music, and other related activities, maintaining a tradition of inculcating love of culture and the arts among students. With this, the University of Mindanao offers scholarship granted to the members of the UM Band and Majorettes, UM Chorale, UM Makabayan Artist Ensemble, UMTC Dance Company.
- Athletics Scholarship (PRISAA and Palarong Pambansa)
- Student Publication Grants
- Family Tuition Discounts

=== Student publication ===
The official student publication of the university (Main Campus) is Primum, which is the Latin term for "first" or "above all." Its predecessor, the Mindanao Collegian, which was later renamed as UM Saga and then EVO prior to its recent name. Since Mindanao Collegian, the publication has been producing top-caliber editors, journalists and columnists in the country not just in the entire region. Collegium is the official student publication of the University of Mindanao Tagum, Inquisitive Eye for the University of Bansalan College, The New Exposé for University of Digos College, Lumina for University of Mindanao Panabo College, The Spectrum for University of Mindanao Guianga College, and the Maroon Ink for the University of Mindanao Ilang.

=== Broadcasting ===
The University of Mindanao Broadcasting Network (UMBN) is a commercial broadcasting company in Visayas and Mindanao founded in 1949 in Davao City. It runs AM and FM stations in Mindanao while its affiliate, Ditan Communications run the Visayas FM stations.

=== Newspaper ===
Mindanao Times, founded on the same year the university was founded, is an affiliate of University of Mindanao.

== Campuses ==
Matina campus

The University of Mindanao has expanded years after its foundation. Today, the University of Mindanao is the largest non-sectarian university in the island of Mindanao. The Bolton campus, a landmark in downtown Davao, bears quiet testimony to the city's fast transformation. The Bolton campus houses the majority of the university's offices that deal with personnel concerns. Currently, the first story holds the College of Law, while the second floor houses the College of Business Administration Education.

The University of Mindanao's largest campus is the Matina Campus, which sits on a 28-hectare area that encompasses the Matina area up to the Ma-a area. From 1949 to 1962, many branches of the university were established, and it provided educational opportunities for the underprivileged students in the bordering province of Davao City.

The institution has its campuses scattered at the different areas in Mindanao, namely:

- University of Mindanao, Tagum City
- University of Mindanao, Digos
- University of Mindanao, Guianga
- University of Mindanao, Tibungco
- University of Mindanao, Bangoy
- University of Mindanao, Panabo
- University of Mindanao, Toril
- University of Mindanao, Peñaplata
- University of Mindanao, Cotabato (defunct)

== Notable alumni ==
Alumni	Career and recognitions
Paolo Duterte	Congressman, 1st district of Davao City
Rigo Duterte	Vice Mayor of Davao City
Cynthia Guiani	Mayor of Cotabato City
Edwin Jubahib	Governor of Davao del Norte
MJ Lastimosa	Miss Universe Philippines 2014 and Miss Universe 2014 top 10 semi-finalist
Esmael Mangudadatu	Congressman, 2nd and lone district of Maguindanao del Sur
Cornelio Maskariño	Congressman, 2nd district of Davao City; dean of UM College of Law
Romeo Momo	Congressman, CWS party-list and 1st district of Surigao del Sur
Pedro Quitain	Judge, dean of UM College of Law, father of Jesus Melchor "Boy" Quitain
Allan L. Rellon	Mayor of Tagum
Zafiro Respicio	OIC Mayor of Davao City; assemblyman, lone district of Davao City
Sonny Wagdos	Filipino long-distance runner and SEA Games medallist
Jay Sonza	News anchor, talk show host
Emilio Escandor	Filipino army colonel and businessman
