= Customer Service Institute of Australia =

The Customer Service Institute of Australia (CSIA) was established in 1997. It is the peak industry organisation in Australia for customer service organisations and professionals. Through the application of the International Customer Service Standard (ICSS:2015–20) and its precursors, CSIA provides an industry voice, skills training, events, research and support to its members. CSIA also hosts the annual Australian Service Excellence Awards (ASEA), which recognise industry excellence.

== Activities ==
The activities of the CSIA are recognized and endorsed by the Prime Minister of Australia. CSIA certifies organisations and individuals to the ICSS and to other standards including the Complaint Handling Standard. The ICSS is reviewed and updated every five years with input from industry professionals. The current standard is the 2015–2020 edition.

== Awards ==
CSIA hosts an annual award ceremony called the Australian Service Excellence Awards, where Australian companies may be nominated for awards, including people’s choice categories. Companies such as Virgin Australia have received multiple awards, ranging from outstanding customer service in 2013 to receiving the Australian Service Excellence Award for Large Business in 2008.

== See also ==
- Customer Service Assurance
