= Contact Centre Association of Zimbabwe =

- Founded: 2010; 16 years ago
- Type: Association
- Purpose: Business
- Location: Zimbabwe
- Key people: Rinos Mautsa (Executive Secretary), Dr Lance Mambondiani (President), Marjorie Madamombe (Vice-President), Fungai Chimwamurombe (Legal), Tawanda Otis Makahamadze (BPO), Tichaona Gandanhamo (Board Member-Finance) Hazel Chitare (Board Member HR)Patricia Mutyavaviri (Board Member- Events) Velile Dube (Southern Region Chairman)
- Website: www.ccaz.org.zw

Contact Centre Association of Zimbabwe is a non-profit making body whose role is to unite the Zimbabwean customer service industry, including Zimbabwean call/contact centres and their professionals, as well as ensuring they meet international standards.

CCAZ is a privately owned non-profit in partnership with local and international contact centre networking groups, call centres, investors, technological vendor suppliers, and professional bodies, as well as government and recruitment agencies.

== History ==
CCAZ was founded in 2010 to cater to contact centres, customer service professionals and companies. The idea of its formation was motivated by other networking groups in first world countries and a few African countries which had yielded tremendous growth in the call centre industry, and connected contact centres and customer services professional with international recruitment agencies and academic professional boards.

Owen Vere was CCAZ's founding President and was in office until 2017 when he was succeeded by Jeff Phiri through the board election. Apart from the executive committee making major decisions, the day-to-day running of the association is done by Rinos Mautsa who is the organization's founder and executive secretary. Rinos Mautsa is an entrepreneur in the customer service sector. On the 15th of November Dr Lance Mambondiani was elected by the members of the Association to be the President for the term 2020-21https://www.herald.co.zw/mambondiani-assumes-ccaz-presidency/

== Partnership with Government ==
CCAZ as an association works closely with the government (especially the Ministry of Information and Communication Technology) in a bid to promote the development of contact centres in Zimbabwe and create more jobs for the nationals. The association also has a mutually beneficial business relationship with the Ministry of Tourism and Hospitality as they partner with CCAZ in an event called the Service Excellence Awards.

When CCAZ was officially launched in 2011, there were only about 100 contact centres in the country. Partnered with the Ministry of Information and Communication Technology CCAZ's goal is to create at least 500 contact centres and over 5 million jobs.

== Service Excellence Awards ==
CCAZ has hosted the Service Excellence Awards annually for the past six years. The awards are given out to recognise, promote and reward organisations excelling in customer service across all sectors. The association has adopted diverse methods such as mystery shopping, questionnaires, the National Customer Satisfaction Index report, and online voting via survey monkey to come up with nominees for this event. A team of adjudicators determine the final list of winners. A sister organization, the Chartered Institute of Customer Management, hosts the same awards regionally since it is a global organisation.
