= Philippine Quality Award =

Philippine award for business management

- Awarded for: Recognizing Filipino businesses for excellence in applying the principles of Total Quality Management
- Sponsored by: Philippine Quality Award Foundation
- Location: Malacañang Palace
- Country: Philippines
- First award: 1998
- Website: www.pqa.org.ph

The Philippine Quality Award Program or PQA is the national quality award for Total Quality Management (TQM) in the Philippines.

== History ==
The Philippine Quality Award is the centerpiece program of the National Action Agenda for Productivity, the blueprint for the Philippines integrated approach to improve economy-wide productivity during the term of President Fidel V. Ramos in response to the growing challenges of globalization. It was created through Executive Order 448 on October 3, 1997. It was institutionalized on February 28, 2001, through the signing of Republic Act 9013, also known as the Philippine Quality Award Act.

=== Objectives ===
These are the three objectives of PQA:

1. To promote standards in organizational performance comparable to those of leading business abroad, pursuant to the country's effort to be globally competitive;
2. To establish a national system for assessing quality and productivity performance, thus providing local organizations regardless of size, sector and maturity with criteria and guidelines for self-assessment to guide their quality and productivity improvement efforts; and
3. To recognize organizations in both the private and public sector which excel in quality management and overall organizational performance, thus providing Philippine industries with benchmarks and models to emulate.

== Recipients ==
Year	Recipient	Award
2015	City Government of Tanauan	Commitment to Quality Management
2015	Colegio de San Juan de Letran-Calamba	Commitment to Quality Management
2015	Department of Labor and Employment XII	Commitment to Quality Management
2015	Department of Science and Technology 4A	Commitment to Quality Management
2015	Mindanao Corrugated Fibreboard, Inc.	Commitment to Quality Management
2015	Philippine Council for Industry, Energy, and Emerging Technology Research and Development	Commitment to Quality Management
2015	Technical Education and Skills Development Authority	Commitment to Quality Management
2015	University of the Philippines-National Engineering Center	Commitment to Quality Management
2015	Land Bank of the Philippines	Proficiency in Quality Management
2015	Lyceum of the Philippines University-Batangas	Proficiency in Quality Management
2015	National Kidney and Transplant Institute	Proficiency in Quality Management
2015	The Thomson Reuters Corporation Pte. Ltd.-Philippine Branch	Proficiency in Quality Management
2014	Department of Science and Technology – Region II	Commitment to Quality Management
2014	Colegio de San Juan de Letran – Manila	Commitment to Quality Management
2014	Lyceum of the Philippines University – Laguna	Commitment to Quality Management
2014	ROHM Electronics Philippines	Proficiency in Quality Management
2014	SMC Yamamura Fuso Molds Corporation	Proficiency in Quality Management
2014	STMicroelectronics	Proficiency in Quality Management
2013	Lyceum of the Philippines University – Manila	Commitment to Quality Management
2013	Zamboanga Polymedic Hospital	Commitment to Quality Management
2013	Philippine Association of Colleges & Universities Commission on Accreditation	Commitment to Quality Management
2013	Department of Science and Technology - Region XI	Commitment to Quality Management
2013	Philippine Information Agency	Commitment in Quality Management
2012	Lyceum of the Philippines University – Batangas	Commitment to Quality Management
2012	Don Bosco Technical College	Commitment to Quality Management
2012	Optodev, Inc	Commitment to Quality Management
2012	Thomson Reuters Corporation Pte. Ltd. Philippine Branch	Commitment to Quality Management
2012	San Miguel Yamamura Asia Corporation	Proficiency in Quality Management
2011	Automotive Air-conditioning Technology Philippines	Proficiency in Quality Management
2011	NYK-TDG eBusiness Corporation	Proficiency in Quality Management
2011	Department of Science and Technology - Region IX	Commitment to Quality Management
2011	Metals Industry Research and Development Council	Commitment to Quality Management
2010	SunPower Philippines Manufacturing Ltd.	Proficiency in Quality Management
2010	Mariwasa Siam Ceramics	Commitment to Quality Management
2010	RCM Manufacturing	Commitment to Quality Management
2009	J.B. Lacson Colleges Foundation-Arevalo	Commitment to Quality Management
2009	National Economic and Development Authority Region I (NEDA-I)	Commitment to Quality Management
2009	Phil. Council for Agriculture, Forestry and Natural Resources Research and Development	Commitment to Quality Management
2008	Unilab	Philippine Quality Award for Performance Excellence
2008	First Philippine Industrial Corporation	Proficiency in Quality Management
2008	Sutherland Global Services	Proficiency in Quality Management
2007	Airlift Asia	Commitment to Quality Management
2006	First Sumiden Circuits	Mastery in Quality Management
2006	Johnson & Johnson Philippines (Consumer Division)	Commitment to Quality Management
2006	National Economic and Development Authority Region I (NEDA-I)	Commitment to Quality Management
2006	National Transmission Corporation	Commitment to Quality Management
2005	NYK Fil-Ship Management	Mastery in Quality Management
2005	Centro Escolar University	Proficiency in Quality Management
2005	University of Santo Tomas	Proficiency in Quality Management
2005	J.B. Lacson Colleges Foundation-Arevalo	Commitment to Quality Management
2004	First Sumiden Circuits	Proficiency in Quality Management
2004	Unilab	Proficiency in Quality Management
2004	MOOG Controls Corporation	Commitment to Quality Management
2004	National Economic and Development Authority Region I (NEDA-I)	Commitment to Quality Management
2003	Panasonic Philippines	Mastery in Quality Management
2003	Indo Phil Group of Companies	Commitment to Quality Management
2002	PSi Technologies	Proficiency in Quality Management
2002	On Semiconductor (formerly AMI Semiconductor, Inc.)	Commitment to Quality Management
2001	Integrated Microelectronics, Inc.	Mastery in Quality Management
2001	Intel Philippines Mfg.	Mastery in Quality Management
2001	Cypress Semiconductor Philippines	Commitment to Quality Management
2000	NXP Semiconductors (formerly Philips Semiconductor, Inc.)	Proficiency in Quality Management
2000	Texas Instruments	Proficiency in Quality Management
2000	Astec Power Phils.	Commitment to Quality Management
2000	City Government of Makati	Commitment to Quality Management
2000	PSi Technologies	Commitment to Quality Management
1999	AMI Semiconductor	Proficiency in Quality Management
1999	City Government of Marikina	Proficiency in Quality Management
1999	National Statistics Office	Commitment to Quality Management
1999	PSi Technologies	Commitment to Quality Management
1998	Acbel Polytech Philippines (Formerly Data General Philippines)	Proficiency in Quality Management
1998	Amkor Technology	Proficiency in Quality Management
1998	AMI Semiconductor	Commitment to Quality Management
1998	City Government of Marikina	Commitment to Quality Management
1998	Electronic Assemblies, Inc. (EAI)	Commitment to Quality Management
1998	San Miguel Yamamura Asia Corp.	Commitment to Quality Management
1998	Yazaki-Torres Mfg.	Commitment to Quality Management

== See also ==
- List of national quality awards
- Total Quality Management
