= Rinos Mautsa =

Zimbabwean entrepreneur

- Born: October 29, 1984 (age 41); Harare, Zimbabwe
- Occupation: Businessman
- Known for: Entrepreneurship
- Notable work: First Call Center organisation establishment in Zimbabwe

Rinos Mautsa is a Zimbabwean entrepreneur. He is well known for starting Zimbabwe's first call center, the Contact Centre Association of Zimbabwe (CCAZ) and co-founder of the Chartered Institute of Customer Management.

He is reported to have promoted and developed Zimbabwe's Business Processing Outsourcing (BPO) industry through CCAZ and Tech24. He is also the founder of Picco Construction and Energy Plus International.

== Early life and education ==
Rinos was born in Harare on 29 October 1984. Raised by a single mother after his father died at a young age, Rinos attended Manjanja Primary School and Emmanuel Secondary School in Nyanga.

Rinos is a holder of a Marketing Management Degree Midlands State University, Masters in Business Administration Midlands State University. Leadership Certificate Oxford University among other qualifications.

== Career ==
Rinos is the founder of the first call centre and software development company in Zimbabwe, Africcs Pvt Ltd which is also now in other Southern African countries. Rinos Mautsa also established the Contact Centre Association of Zimbabwe which is now the sole association of customer services and call centres in Zimbabwe with over 100 corporates as members.

Rinos is a founding member and chairman of Zimbabwe Youth Housing Cooperative Association which now have over 5000 members in five provinces and is working with various government departments to build low cost housing units for youths in Zimbabwe.

He is also a In 2014 he established the Chartered Institute of Customer Management which is offering professional qualification globally with channel partners in over 30 countries.

=== Positions ===
Rinos was the founder of Contact Centre Association of Zimbabwe, Zimbabwe Youth Housing Cooperative Association and Chartered Institute of Customer Management.

Rinos has been involved in several established businesses and has held the following positions:

- Founder and Chairman of Facelift Construction, Energy Plus International and Tech24 Pvt Ltd.
- Proctor and Associates board chairperson
- World Economic Forum’s Global Shapers Curator. As curator of the Harare Hub Rinos managed to organise the first townhall to be attended by the president of Zimbabwe Cde Emmerson Mnangagwa dubbed “Road to Davos where he met the Zimbabwean youth
- Founding Trustee of Campus Community Foundation which have presence in 6 African countries (January 2015 to date).
- He is part of the mentors for the Queen Elizabeth Young Leaders programme-UK.
- Zimbabwe Youth Council Vice Chairperson (Jan 2015 to 2017). The council is a government youth apex board which governs the affairs of young people in Zimbabwe.
- Internal Control Institute board member (January 2016 to date).
- Project chairperson of Government National Call Centre (Zimbabwe)
- United Nations Association of Young Professionals based in USA board member

=== Competitions ===
He has been judge for the following awards:

- Service Excellence Awards (2009-2012)
- Buy Zimbabwe Awards in 2014 and 2015
- Retailers Awards for 2016
- Harare Metro Corporate Social Responsibility Awards hosted by the Provincial Minister of Harare Metro in Zimbabwe.

== Recognition ==
- 2017 Crans Montana leader of tomorrow – Crans Montana Forum – Switzerland
- 2016 Desmond Tutu Fellow – African Leadership Institute (AFLI) – UK
- 2014 Young Visionaries Fellow Winner – Indian Government – India
- 2015 Leadership Award of the Year – Megafest Awards - Zimbabwe
- Young Manager of The Year (Zimbabwe Institute of Management)
- 2015 JCI Outstanding Young Persons – Junior Chamber International
- ICT Young Achiever runner up (2012)- Ministry of ICT Zimbabwe
- Industry Champion Award (Call Centre Industry) (Global Association of Contact Centers-USA)

== Further read ==
- Customer Service Conference
- Youth Workshop
- Service Excellence Awards
