= Integrated Micro-Electronics, Inc. =

Philippine semiconductor company

- Type: Public
- Traded as: PSE: IMI
- Industry: Electronics manufacturing
- Founded: August 8, 1980; 46 years ago in Cupang, Muntinlupa, Philippines
- Founder: Ayala Corporation and Resins, Inc.
- Headquarters: Laguna Technopark; Biñan, Laguna, Philippines
- Number of locations: 19 manufacturing sites
- Area served: Worldwide
- Key people: Alberto M. de Larrazabal (Non-Executive Director, Chairman); Louis Sylvester Hughes (CEO)
- Revenue: ▲$996 million (2025)
- Net income: ▲$13.5 million (2025)
- Owner: AC Industrials (52.03%); Resins Inc. (13.16%)
- Subsidiaries: Speedy-Tech Electronics; PSi Technologies
- Website: www.global-imi.com

Integrated Micro-Electronics, Inc. (abbreviated as IMI, PSE: IMI) provides electronics manufacturing services (EMS) and power semiconductor assembly and test services (SATS) with manufacturing facilities in Asia and Europe. Its headquarters is located in Biñan, Laguna.

IMI is a leading global electronics manufacturing solutions expert specializing in highly reliable and quality electronics for long product life cycle segments in the automotive, industrial, power electronics, communications, and medical industries. IMI continues to rank among the world’s leading EMS providers according to Manufacturing Market Insider’s 2024 report and remains a key player in automotive electronics. The manufacturing portfolio of AC Industrials, a wholly owned subsidiary of Ayala Corporation, IMI is listed in the Philippine Stock Exchange.

== History ==
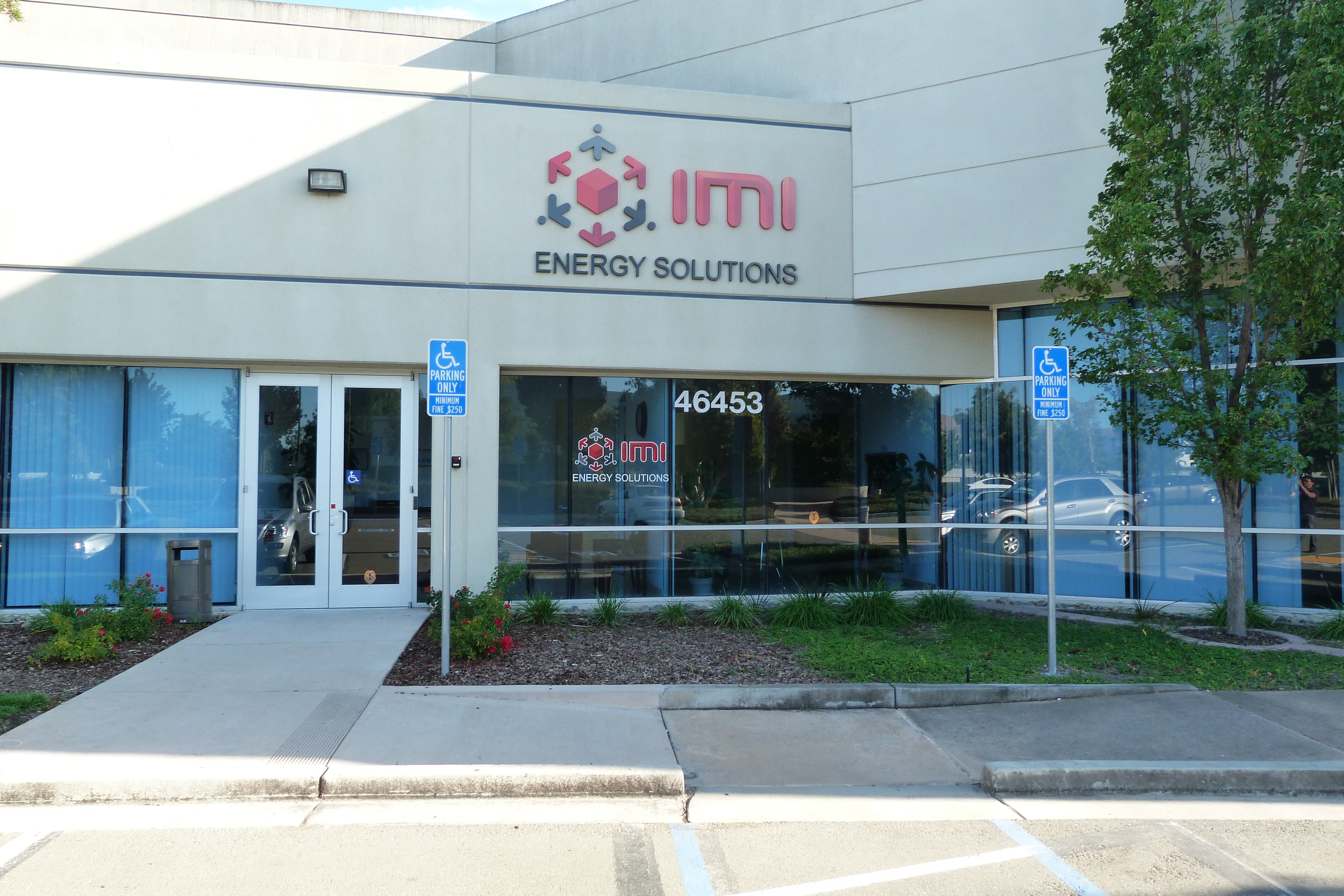
IMI Energy Solutions at Fremont, California, USA.

IMI started on August 8, 1980 as a joint venture between Ayala Corporation and Resins, Inc. With its headquarters in Muntinlupa, they were just a workforce of around 100 employees with total fixed assets of US$3,700,290 and it is engaged in the assembly of integrated circuits. In 1982, it took a contract manufacturing with its hard disk drive sub-assembly operations and, in 1986, it started the assembly of automotive hybrid integrated circuits.

In the year 1988, the company ventured into custom printed circuit board assembly and operations and in the next years, it offered standard printed circuit board assembly services with the acquisition of automated surface mounting equipment, and eventually, full product assembly and flexible printed circuit board assembly operations.

The company moved its manufacturing site in 1995 from Cupang, Muntinlupa to its present location at the Laguna Technopark. In 1998, IMI commenced offering hardware and software design services, that transitions the company to a total electronics manufacturing service provider. By 2001, IMI had three manufacturing sites in the Philippines.

As of 2024, IMI has 18 manufacturing sites of 410,901 SQM with more than 10,368 employees across 8 countries. From an EMS company, it expanded its scope to include EMS and Power Semiconductor Assembly and Test Services. IMI is also into prototyping, manufacturing, product test development, testing and order fulfillment.

=== Global expansion ===
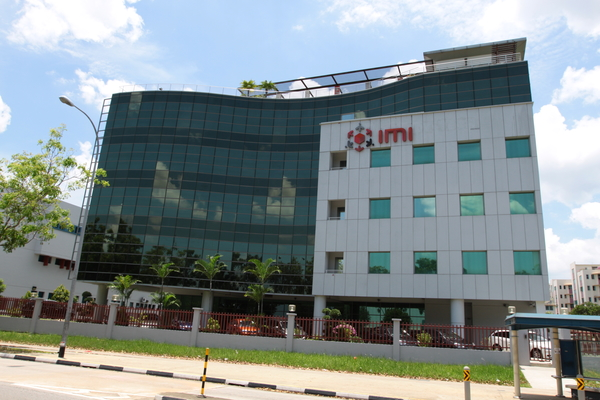
Speedy Tech Industrial Building which hosts IMI Singapore on Kian Tech Lane.

IMI has several sites in North America, Europe, and Asia, where it provides services to original equipment manufacturers (OEMs). In 2005, IMI acquired the EMS assets of Saturn Electronics and Engineering Inc. in the US and the Speedy-Tech Electronics Ltd of Singapore. The acquisition of Speedy-Tech eventually led to the establishment of IMI's presence in China—through three facilities, namely, two in Shenzhen and one in Jiaxing. It previously had a manufacturing plant in Chengdu, but IMI decided to close it down in December 2024 as part of a broad streamlining and cost-cutting strategy, after the company reported a net loss of P9.2 million in the first 9 months of 2024 as a result of prevailing soft market conditions at the time.

IMI strengthened its presence in Europe and North America in 2011 through the acquisition of EPIQ NV subsidiaries in Bulgaria, the Czech Republic, and Mexico.

In September 2016, IMI acquired a 76 percent stake in the optical bonding and display solutions company, VIA optronics GmbH for 47.4 million euros financed through debt, hoping to break into the business of automotive cameras and display monitor solutions for advanced driver assistance systems. However, the business was hit by the pandemic and never recovered. In March 2024, it booked a loss of $13.3 million due to rising competition and logistics costs and exacerbated by a scandal related to financial irregularities involving its former CEO and founder Jürgen Eichner, culminating with its decision to delist its shares in the New York Stock Exchange. In November 2025, IMI finally decided to sell its 50.32% controlling stake in the company to Kronen 3140 GmbH as part of its effort to refocus on its core strength in EMS services.

IMI also acquired 80 percent stake of Surface Technology International (STI) Enterprise, in 2017, through the subsidiary Integrated Micro-Electronics UK Ltd. STI is an electronics design and manufacturing company that provides both printed circuit board assembly and full box-build manufacturing for industries such as aerospace and defense markets. It has two manufacturing sites in United Kingdom, as well as in Cebu, Philippines, and a design center in London.

=== Domestic expansion ===
In 2010, IMI acquired PSi Technologies, a power semiconductor assembly and test service provider. The company bought the minority shares of PSi Technologies in 2014.

In January 2015, IMI acquired the remaining shares of PSi from private investment firms Narra Venture Capital II LP and Narra Associates II Limited.

In 2016, Ayala Corporation announced that it will consolidate its businesses in car dealership and industrial operations into a wholly owned subsidiary AC Industrials—this includes IMI. IMI has the major role of being the manufacturing arm of AC Industrials for its wide range of portfolio. The first project was the motorcycle assembly factory in partnership with KTM AG group under KTM Asia Motorcycle.

=== Stock exchange listing ===
On January 21, 2010, IMI listed 1.137 billion common shares in the Philippine Stock Exchange.

It has completed its follow-on offering and listing of 215,000,000 common shares on December 5, 2014. IMI has 1,856,899,921 outstanding shares, as of March 31, 2015.

== Capabilities ==
IMI is an EMS player in the automotive industry. Aside from assembly services, IMI provides automotive tier 1 suppliers and original equipment manufacturer services such as design and product development and test systems development. The company manufactures safety electronics for vehicles such as automotive cameras and airbag controls.

The company also produces access control devices design against theft and dosimeters. It is also involved in the robotics industry. In addition to these, IMI also produces medical diagnostic devices and telecom infrastructure devices.

Its technology groups collaborate with one another and with customers to develop platforms or baseline technologies in areas such as camera and imaging, motor drives, power modules, lighting systems, short range wireless, human-to-machine interface, sensors, and medical electronics.

=== Engineering ===
==== Design & Development ====
The Design & Development (D&D) group of IMI focuses on complex automation deployments in different internal segments, business units, and external customers which includes applications in automation handling, dispensing, screwing, and customized auto feeding system for mass production. It has an extensive competencies in electronic design, mechanical design, and software development, and building platforms in the areas of automotive cameras, motor drives, and power modules. D&D provides full design services from concept to product validation. D&D provides contract design and joint development services that covers power electronics, embedded systems, camera and imaging systems, motor drives, power modules, power semiconductors, LED lighting and display design, and low and high radio-frequency design.

==== Advanced Manufacturing Engineering ====
The Advanced Manufacturing Engineering (AME) works on several industrial microelectromechanical systems-based inertial measurement unit modules, commercial laser display modules, and automotive camera modules, including the IMI minicube camera platform. AME is developing a fully automated assembly line that manufactures a complex electro-mechanical assembly for automotive safety and security electronic control at IMI Jiaxing as well as in IMI Mexico. AME is collaborating with D&D on a low cost automotive camera and power modules.

==== Test & Systems Development ====
IMI's Test & Systems Development (TSD) expanded the development and application of fully automated test systems that integrate common backend process requirements—product marking, automated inspection, and unit sorting. It also developed an innovative test solutions for automotive electronics, EV vehicle boards and power electronics. It designed and implemented a new line of testers for power module devised and collaborated with a customer to build a fully automated tester for power train boards for EV.

==== Camera & Vision Technology ====
The Camera and Vision Technology (CVT) group equips IMI to be ready with autonomous driving. A spun off from the D&D in 2016, the group focuses on developing vision-based products that support the different Advanced Driver Assistance Systems (ADAS) applications. In 2017, The group synced with AME and TSD to become a one-stop shop solution for camera design, prototype development and mass production.

=== Manufacturing ===
==== Manufacturing Solutions ====
As initially an EMS company, the manufacturing arm of IMI produces products for original equipment manufacturers (OEMs). Among the OEM products and assembly services that the company provides include automotive camera, power modules, complete box builds, sub-assembly, component assembly, precision assembly and automated through-hole assembly.

==== Plastic Capability ====
IMI also manufactures plastic parts in Asia, Europe and North America that makes box-build capabilities accessible to its partners in automotive, industrial and consumer electronics industries. It integrates parts such as covers, housings and connectors in sub-assemblies, specializing in electronic box-build. Low pressure molding and thermoforming are the process capabilities of IMI.

==== Precision Machining ====
The Precision Machining group is capable of fabricating components for various parts of any material for its customers. Some of the processes includes, material preparation in vertical and horizontal band saw, squaring on conventional machines (milling), CNC machining, finishing grinding deburring machine, coordinate measuring machine (CCM), and metal sheet works.

==== Motorcycle Assembly ====
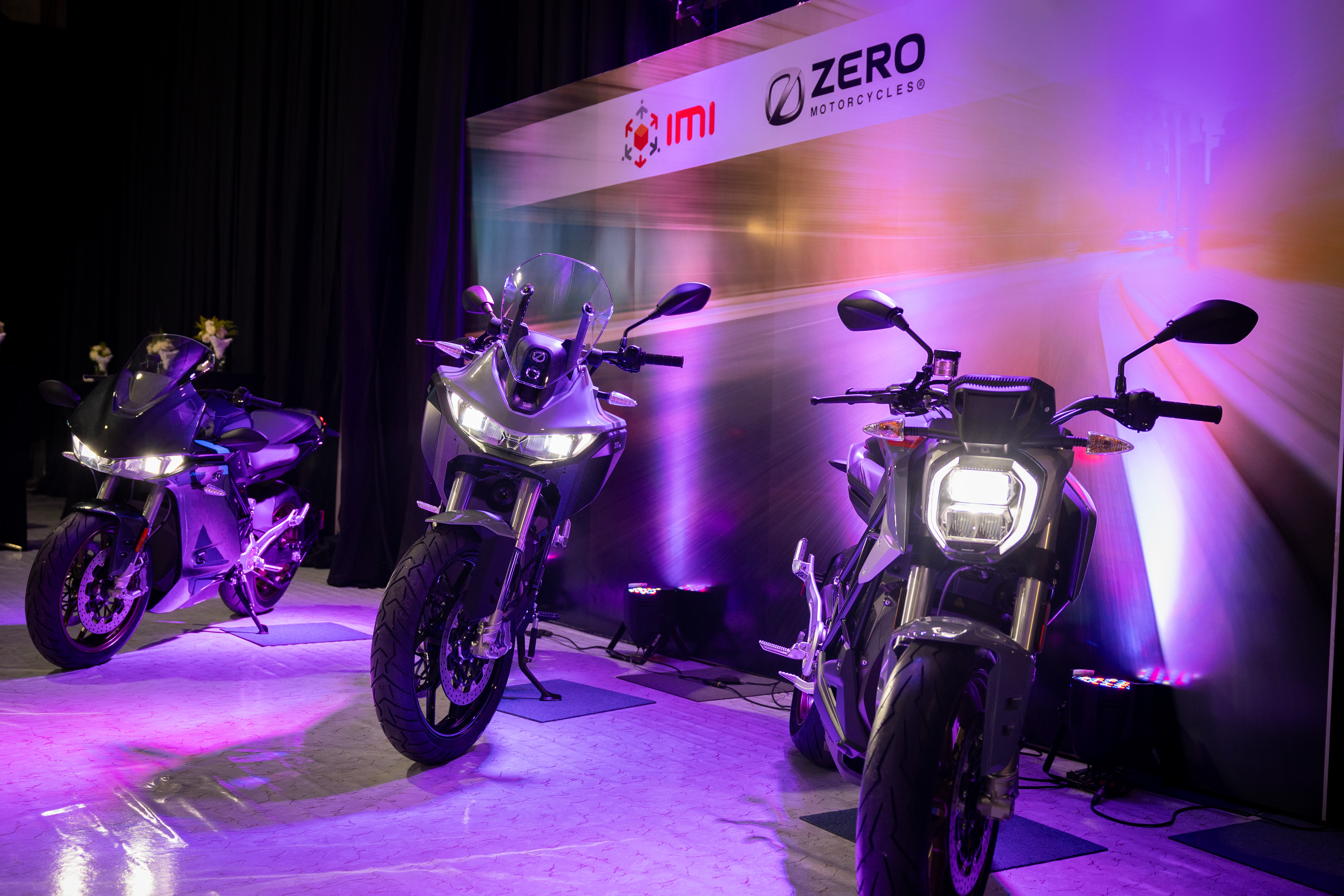
Zero Motorcycles.

IMI produces motorcycle for the KTM AG group. A joint venture between KTM Asia Motorcycle Manufacturing (KAMMI) and Adventure Cycle Philippines of AC Industrials, IMI assembles four (4) models of the KTM motorcycles in its plant in Laguna, Philippines.

Starting in 2024, IMI will manufacture motorcycles for Zero.

==== System Integration ====
The System Integration group of IMI integrates different subsystem and modules into one large system. It serves a wide variety of complex build-to-print and contract design manufacturing requirements and increases value to systems by adding new functionalities while linking all functions of different systems. IMI combines complex PCBAs, electronics and mechanical assemblies with robotics into one system.

== Subsidiaries and affiliates ==
IMI has four wholly owned subsidiaries that carry out the business through the various operating entities globally:

Integrated Micro-Electronics, Inc.
Group of Companies
- IMI International (Singapore) Pte Ltd. (IMI Singapore)
  - IMI International ROHQ (IMI ROHQ)
  - Speedy-Tech Electronics Ltd. (STEL) Group
    - IMI Technology (Shenzhen) Co. Ltd. (IMI-SZ)
      - IMI Smart Technology (Shenzhen) Co. Ltd.
    - Speedy-Tech Electronics (HK) Ltd. (IMI-STHK)
    - Speedy-Tech Electronics (Jiaxing) Co., Ltd. (IMI-STJX)
    - Cooperatief IMI Europe U.A.
      - Integrated Micro-Electronics Bulgaria EOOD (IMI Bulgaria)
        - Microenergia EOOD (Microenergia)
      - Integrated Micro-Electronics d.o.o. Niš (IMI Serbia)
      - Integrated Micro-Electronics Mexico, S.A.P.I. de C.V. (IMI Mexico)
      - IMI France SAS (IMI France)
  - Integrated Micro-Electronics UK Ltd. (IMI UK)
    - Surface Technology International Enterprises Ltd (STI)
      - STI Limited
      - STI Philippines Inc. (STI Philippines)
      - STI Asia Ltd
      - STI Supplychain Ltd
      - ST Intercept Limited
- IMI USA, Inc.
- IMI Japan, Inc.
- PSi Technologies, Inc. (PSi)
  - PSiTech Realty, Inc.
  - Pacsem Realty, Inc.

=== IMI Singapore ===
IMI Singapore or officially IMI International (Singapore) Pte Ltd. wholly owns Speedy-Tech Electronics Ltd. when IMI acquired it on 2005. STEL, which provides EMS and power electronics, manages the China and Singapore operations. IMI Singapore also holds Cooperatief IMI Europe U.A that manages the Europe and Mexico operations from the acquisition of EPIQ NV. IMI ROHQ is also an affiliate that serves as a supervisory, communications and coordinating center for IMI Singapore affiliates and subsidiaries. It holds the stake of IMI in VIA Optronics and IMI UK which has stake in STI Enterprises.

=== IMI USA ===
IMI USA, Inc. acts as direct support to the Group's customers by providing program management, customer service, engineering development and prototype manufacturing services. It is also engaged in precision assembly of surface mount technology, chip on flex, chip on board, flip chip on flex, advanced manufacturing process development, engineering development, prototype manufacturing, and small precision assemblies.

=== IMI Japan ===
IMI Japan, Inc. offers the services, such as technical, quality assurance, sales and commercial support, to answer the needs diverse range of Japanese-based OEMs. It also functions as a program management center for new business that will be endorsed to other subsidiaries. There are no manufacturing operations in IMI Japan.

=== PSi Technologies ===
PSi Technologies, Inc. is a Philippine company, that provides power semiconductor assembly and test services, that IMI bought shares of 56%, and in 2012 it was fully acquired by IMI through the acquisition of the minority of the shares.

== Reception ==
IMI received Circuit Assembly's 2007 Service Excellence Award for the Highest Overall Customer Ranking for medium-sized EMS company category. (Circuit Assembly is a US-based electronics industry trade publication that recognizes companies that receive the highest customer service ratings, as judged by their own customers.) The ASEAN Business Advisory Council, hailed IMI as one of the 12 most admired companies in Southeast Asia.

IMI ranks 23rd on the list of top EMS providers in the world based on 2023 EMS-related revenues as reported by Manufacturing Market Insider. It is also the 9th largest EMS player in the automotive industry as reported by New Venture Research based on 2023 EMS-related revenues.

IMI's Analytical Testing and Calibration (ATC) laboratory was granted accreditation for ISO/IEC 17025:2005 on January 8, 2016, by the Philippine Accreditation Bureau (PAB) of the Department of Trade and Industry. The accreditation demonstrates technical competence for the scope specified by the PAB and the operation of a laboratory quality management system that meets the principles of ISO 9001:2008.

== Social involvement ==
IMI has a corporate social responsibility program. IMI began a sustainable community livelihood program through a partnership with ChildFund Foundation and Yakap sa Kaunlaran ng Bata, Inc. (YKBI). Along with this organization IMI, provided the women from the Parents Association of San Pablo and Bay, Laguna, with 10 sewing machines to encourage them toward self-reliance and supplement their entrepreneurial skills. The Parents Associations of both communities are now sewing blouses for Krizia, a garment manufacturer.
