= Service climate =

Service Climate has been embedded in the research of social climate (see also: Social environment) which relates to the overall group influence of individuals who partake in certain within-group activities (i.e. Waiting staff). The group aspect of service climate has been compared to atmospheric climate in a way to illustrate its inner distinctive characteristics between different groups of individuals. The social environment has also been related to entrepreneurial leadership within business management and how organizing a group of people can be done to achieve a common goal. Evidence also leads to a rise in research beginning with early social experiments in the 1960s.

"Like meteorological or atmospheric climate, social climate is relatively distinctive across groups (as the Tropics differ from the Himalayas); is dynamic or changeable within groups (like the seasons); and can influence behavior (like an individual’s choice of clothing). Social climate research has grown considerably since White and Lippitt’s (1960) early experiments comparing democratic, autocratic, and laissez-faire leadership in small groups of children. The concept and measurement of social climate have since been applied across widely diverse disciplines both within and outside the field of psychology."

Climate for service refers to employee perceptions of the practices, procedures, and behaviors that get rewarded, supported, and expected with regard to customer service and customer service quality. For example, to the extent that employees perceive that they are rewarded for delivering quality service, their organization's service climate will be stronger. Additionally, perceptions that customer service is important to management will also contribute to a strong service climate.

"A set of foundation issues that support employee work and service quality is conceptualized as a necessary but not sufficient cause of a climate for service, which in turn is proposed to be reflected in customer experiences."

Service climate is a collective and shared phenomenon. This climate is built in the light of organizational practices focused on customer service.

The way boundary workers (employees with whom customers physically interact in the course of doing business with an organization) perceive their organizations' service climates are related to the service quality perceived by those organizations' customers.

== Importance of the service climate ==
Research has shown that service quality is ultimately related to customer loyalty and retention and, eventually, to higher profits for the organization. "This skepticism about the value of service quality makes it imperative that research be undertaken to address the quantification of the impact of customer satisfaction on observable financial measures, to place programs to improve customer satisfaction and service quality on an even footing with most other business programs that must justify themselves financially.".

== Antecedents of the service climate ==
The recent research had confirmed the previous findings regarding the positive relationship between organizational resources as an antecedent of service climate, and also showed that this relationship is fully mediated by engagement at the group level. Thus, at the work-unit level, engagement contributes to improve shared service climate among service units.

As well, the research shows that when employees working in work units perceive that the availability of organizational resources (i.e., training, autonomy and technology) remove obstacles at work, they feel more engaged in work, which in turn is related to a better climate for service. Working in an organization that facilitates work for the customers exerts a powerful influence on collective engagement (i.e., the members of the work unit feel more vigorous and persistent, dedicated and absorbed in their tasks). This in turn has a very positive impact on shared service climate perceptions.

The relation between the service climate and customer loyalty seems to be reciprocal, since it was found that the greater is the service climate, the higher is the customer loyalty, (partially mediated by performance) and the higher is the customer loyalty, the greater is the service climate.(Schneider et al., 1998).
