= Emilio Escandor =

Emilio Decena Escandor (May 28, 1944 – September 15, 2012) was a Filipino army colonel and businessman who founded the Davao Security and Investigation Agency in 1972 and the Royal Mandaya Hotel in 1998. He was a close friend of Rodrigo Duterte, the 16th president of the Philippines.

Escandor was the father of Glenn Escandor, the owner of Genesis88 Construction and Duterte's presidential assistant for sports.

== Early life and education ==
Escandor was born on May 28, 1944 to Filemon Escandor, a military sergeant from Gubat, Sorsogon, and Basilisa Decena, a native of Labrador, Pangasinan. His family later moved to Davao City.

He attended Mindanao Colleges (now the University of Mindanao), where he was active in the Reserve Officers' Training Corps, becoming a corps commander. He later graduated with a bachelor's degree in political science in 1965, and soon after attended a six-month probationary training program at Camp Evangelista within Cagayan de Oro. By April 1966, he was installed as second lieutenant at the camp.

== Career ==
Escandor established the Davao Security and Investigation Agency, Inc. (Dasia) on September 8, 1972 at his family residence in Davao City. To accompany this, he later set up the Dasia Security Training Academy as a school for security officers. Dasia was later incorporated in January 1986.

In 1991, Escandor helped his wife Violeta in establishing the four-storey Kadayawan Inn in Davao City, which she intended to be managed by their eldest son Glenn.

In 1994, Escandor and his wife Violeta began construction of the Royal Mandaya Hotel, named after his wife's ancestral tribe; although its completion was briefly threatened by the Asian financial crisis in 1997, it later opened on September 8, 1998. Earlier, they had established the Royal Mandaya Hotel Corporation to serve as the hotel's owner, for which Escandor served as its president and Glenn as its vice president. Escandor had initially arranged for Barcelo Hotel Group, a company based in Spain, to operate the hotel as a way to appeal more to foreigners, but by March 2001, Barcelo ended its management of Royal Mandaya, with Glenn soon becoming its operator instead.

== Personal life ==
Escandor married Violeta Yap, a teacher at Stella Maris Academy of Davao who descended from the Mandaya tribe, on December 20, 1967 at the Sta. Ana Church in Davao City. They had two children: Glenn and Gerome. Escandor and Glenn participated in golfing tournaments together. His grandson Francis Gabriel Escandor (born 1999) is a basketball player.

Escandor died of an illness on September 15, 2012 at St. Luke's Medical Center in Quezon City, with his remains brought to Davao City the next day.

Escandor was known as a close friend of Davao City Mayor Rodrigo Duterte, who was his classmate in high school. After Duterte's successful presidential campaign in 2016, the Escandor family's newly-established Matina Enclaves Residences in Davao City was used as Duterte's temporary office as president-elect.
