= Lyceum of the Philippines University =

Private university in Manila, Philippines

- Pamantasang Liseo ng Pilipinas (Filipino)
- Former name: Lyceum of the Philippines
- Motto: Veritas et Fortitudo; Pro Deo et Patria; (Latin)
- Motto in English: Truth and Courage; For God and Country
- Type: Private non-sectarian, coeducational higher education institution
- Established: July 7, 1952 (74 years and 122 days)
- Founder: Jose P. Laurel
- Academic affiliations: Intramuros Consortium, ASAIHL, SMIIC PACUCOA
- Chairman: Lorna P. Laurel
- President: Roberto P. Laurel
- Vice-president: Sarah L. Lopez (Finance); Jennifer D. Tucpi (Academic Affairs)
- Students: 20,010 (1st semester SY 2016–17; Manila campus only)
- Location: Intramuros, Manila, Metro Manila, Philippines; 14°35′30″N 120°58′40″E
- Campus: Urban
- Satellite campuses: Makati; Cavite; Batangas; Laguna; Davao
- Alma Mater song: Awit ng Lyceum
- Colors: Red and Gray
- Nickname: Pirates
- Sporting affiliations: NCAA, WNCAA, ISAA, V-League
- Mascot: Pipo the Pirate
- Website: www.lpu.edu.ph

- Location in Manila Location in Metro Manila Location in Luzon Location in the Philippines

Lyceum of the Philippines University (Filipino: Pamantasang Liseo ng Pilipinas), also referred to by its acronym LPU, is a private, non-sectarian, coeducational higher education institution located at Intramuros in the City of Manila, Philippines. It was founded in 1952 by José P. Laurel, who was the third president of the Republic of the Philippines.

Two of LPU's prominent features are its entrance gate through the "Hall of Heroes", commonly known as "Mabini Hall", which exhibits busts of Philippine historical figures sculpted by the National Artist Guillermo Tolentino, and the "Lyceum Tower", which serves as the school's landmark.

Many disciplines are taught in the university, with International relations (diplomacy, international trade), business, communication and International Hospitality (hotel and restaurant management, tourism) consistently being the university's flagship courses.

The LPU has affiliate/branch campuses in Makati, Batangas, Laguna, Cavite and Davao.

== History ==
=== Establishment ===
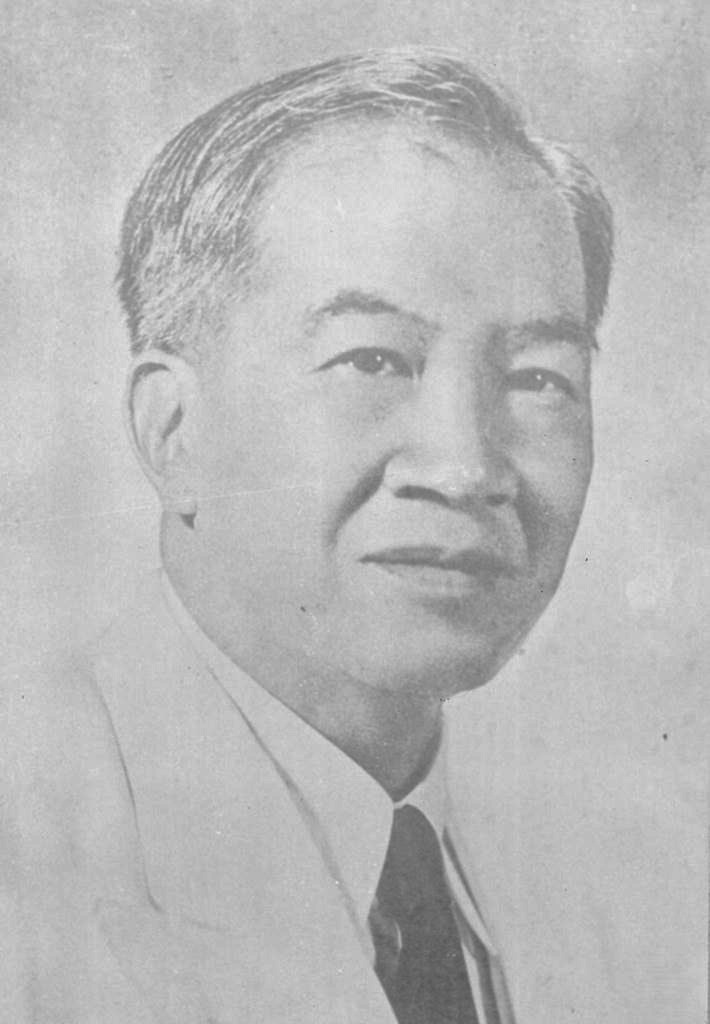
José P. Laurel, Founder of Lyceum of the Philippines University

Lyceum of the Philippines University was founded in 1952 by José P. Laurel, who became the third president of the Philippines, making LPU the only school founded by a Philippine president. He named the institution after lykeion, the grove in ancient Athens where Aristotle taught his pupils. Its educational vision is founded on principles that its founder, José P. Laurel, set down. It opened its gates to its first students on July 7, 1952.

The LPU Manila campus was built on the site where the old San Juan de Dios Hospital was located.

The university offers undergraduate and graduate programs in various fields including law, the liberal arts, diplomacy, international trade and journalism, as well as nursing, engineering, business and accountancy, mass communications, tourism, and hotel and restaurant management.

=== During the Marcos dictatorship ===
When debt-driven projects during President Ferdinand Marcos' 1969 Presidential campaign led to a massive debt crisis in late December 1969, a wave of student activism swept through the country, and the Lyceum of the Philippines was one of its venues.

During one of the First Quarter Storm protests of the time, Lyceum student Enrique Sta. Brigida was caught and tortured to death by the police; poet Amado V. Hernandez wrote a poem, "Enrique Sta. Brigida: Paghahatid sa Imortalidad," (Tagalog "Deliverance to Immortality") which was read at Sta Brigida's funeral on March 10.

Marcos cracked down hard on student protestors, so that many "moderate" students who originally only asked for reforms were forced to hide from authorities, where the dictatorship's hardline stance gave them no choice but to join the underground resistance. After Marcos declared Martial Law in September 1972, many Lyceum students and alumni were tortured, killed, or both - notably students Alberto Espinas, Eugene "Gene" Grey, and Nestor Pricipe. Others, like student Ramon Jasul, Political Science alumnus Charlie Del Rosario simply disappeared and were never heard from again.

After Marcos was deposed by the civilian-organized People Power Revolution of 1986, Espinas, Grey, Principe, Jasul, and Del Rosario were honored by having their names inscribed on the Wall of Remembrance at the Philippines' Bantayog ng mga Bayani (Tagalog, "Monument of Heroes"), which honors the martyrs who sacrificed their lives to resist the authoritarian regime.

=== Autonomous status ===
The Lyceum of the Philippines University was granted Autonomous Status by the Commission on Higher Education (CHED). It is a Category "A" teaching university in the Philippines. Category "A" assessment is the highest level in the Institutional Quality Assurance through Monitoring and Evaluation framework developed by the Commission on Higher Education (CHED) as another means to assess and monitor the quality of an institution.

It is rated one of the Philippine's Top Universities by Commission on Higher Education (CHED) and the only university in the Philippines passed the accreditation of The Tourism and Hospitality Management Education, Center of Excellence or THE-ICE and hailed as one of the best Asian universities of QS 2022 ranking.

It is a member of the Intramuros Consortium which includes Mapúa University, Colegio de San Juan de Letran, and Pamantasan ng Lungsod ng Maynila (University of the City of Manila).

Four programs — Business Administration, Hotel and Restaurant Management, Liberal Arts, and Sciences — have Level 3 Reaccredited Status by the Philippine Association of Colleges and Universities Commission on Accreditation while its Computer Engineering, Information Technology, Tourism, Computer Science, Nursing, Master of Public Administration, Master of Business Administration were granted Level 2 Reaccredited Status by PACUCOA (Philippine Association of Colleges and Universities Commission on Accreditation).

=== Other notable events ===
In 2012, Lyceum marked its 60th foundation anniversary. The Philippine Postal Corporation, together with the LPU administration, released a commemorative stamp.

In 2013, President Benigno S. Aquino III formally recognized and awarded the Lyceum of the Philippines University – Manila with the Recognition for Commitment to Quality Management in the 16th Philippine Quality Award conferment ceremonies held in Malacañang Palace.

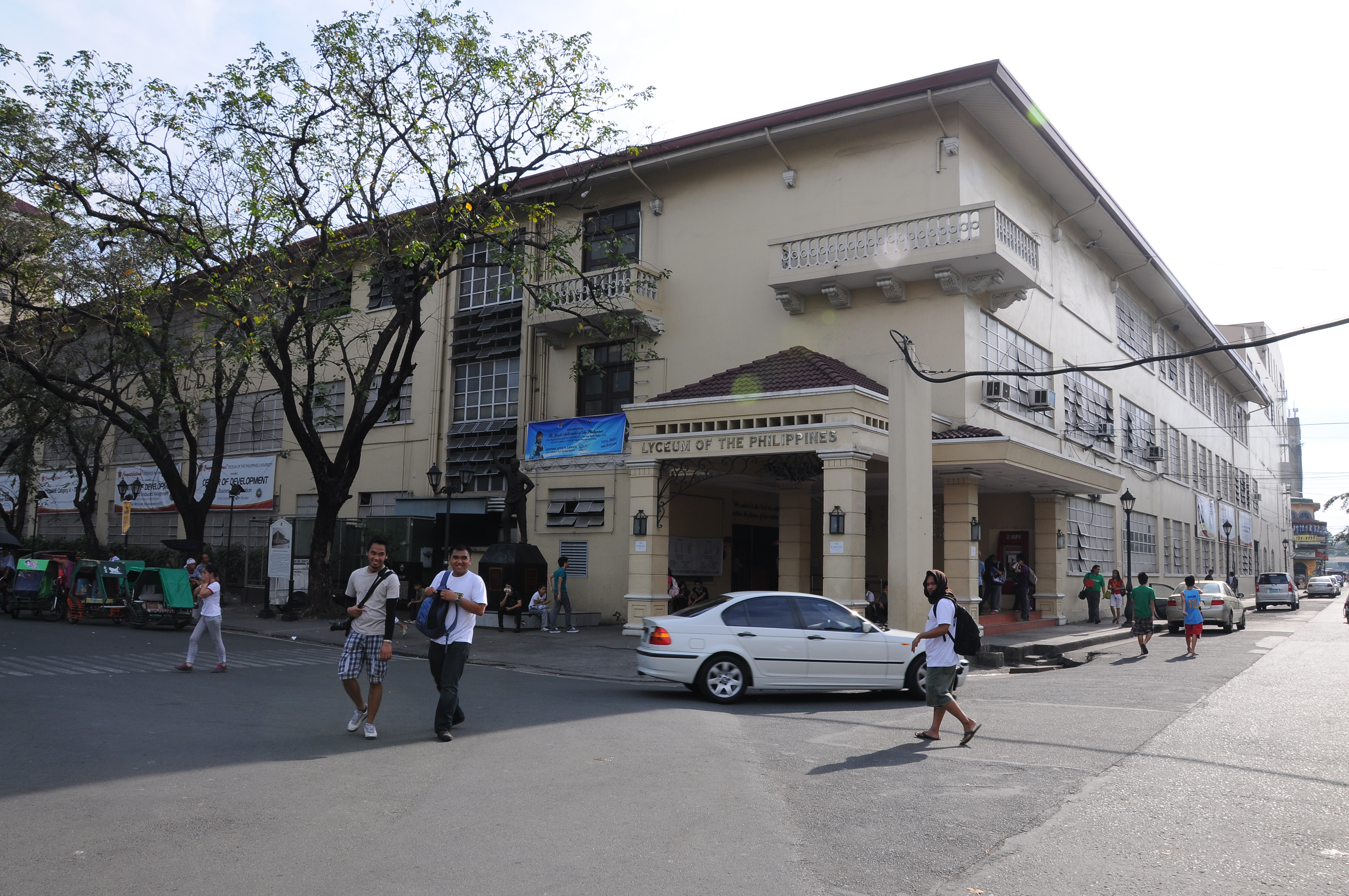
LPU during regular school days.

== Colleges and graduate school ==
College/school founding
| College/school | Year founded^{*} |
| College of Arts and Sciences | 1952 |
| College of Business Administration | 1952 |
| College of Technology | 2015 |
| College of International Relations | 1954 |
| College of International Tourism Hospitality Management | 1998 |
| College of Nursing | 2002 |
| College of Computer and Information Sciences | 1969 |
| College of Law | 1952 |
| Claro M. Recto Academy of Advanced Studies | 1953 |

=== College of Arts and Sciences ===
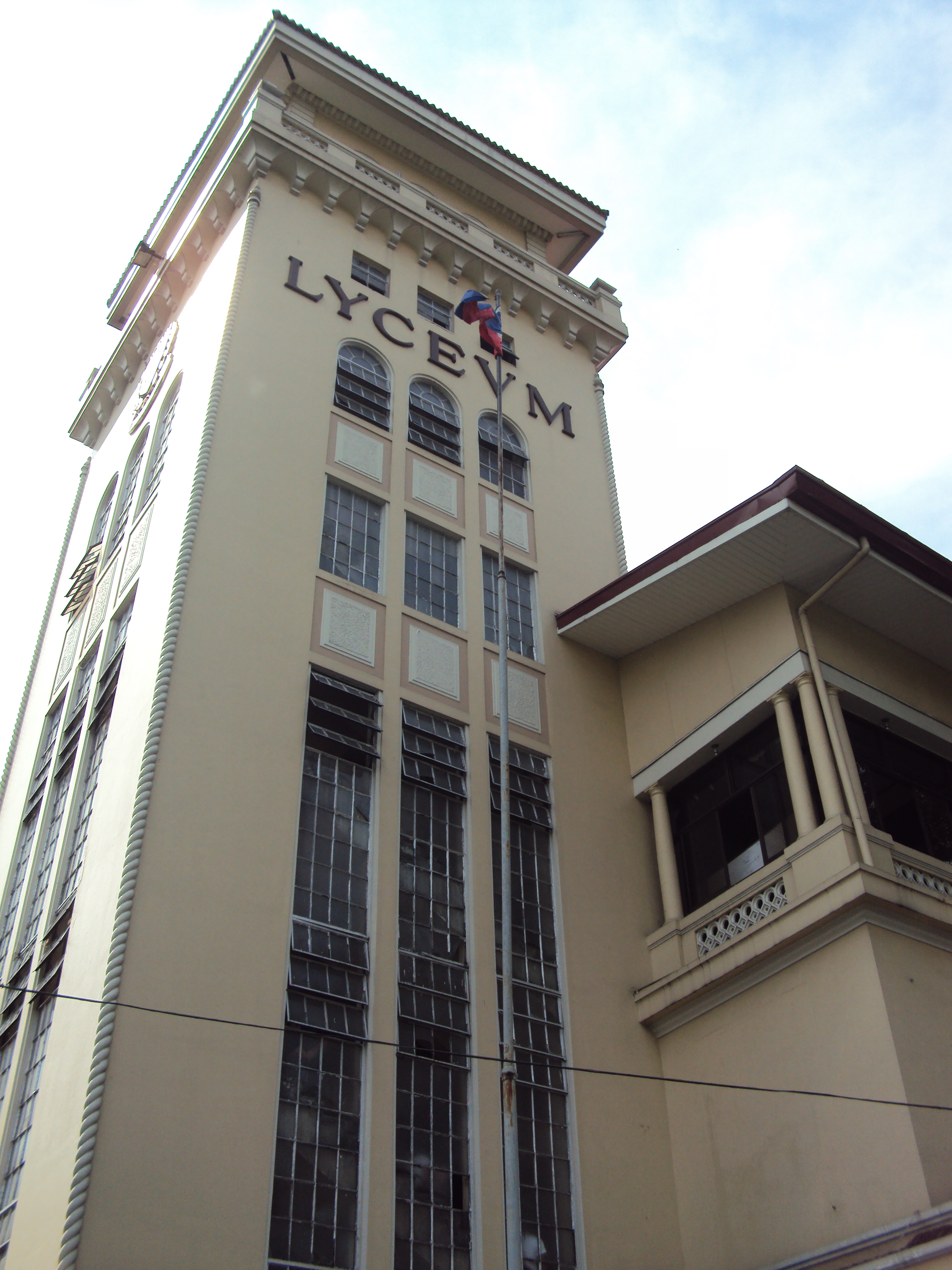
The Lyceum Tower in Intramuros

Liberal Arts and Science programs are granted Level 3 Reaccredited Status by PACUCOA

==== History ====
The School of Arts and Sciences was one of the three original schools of the Lyceum of the Philippines University. It had an enrollment of 350 students when it first opened in 1952, with Prof. José A. Adeva Sr. as dean.

On June 15, 1953, Recognition Nos. 281 282 s. 1953 for Bachelor of Arts and Associate in Arts respectively were granted by the Department of Education.

Adeva was designated on May 17, 1962, as dean of the School of Humanities and Sciences. This was subsequently followed on May 21, 1962, by the integration of the different schools: the School of Arts and Sciences, Journalism, Foreign Service, Education, and Economics and Business Administration on May 21, 1962.

Presently, CAS is composed of the following departments: Department of Legal Studies, Department of Mass Communication and Journalism and Department of Psychology. Also in the CAS are the following General Education (GE) Departments: Department of English and Literature, Department of Filipino, Department of Humanities, Department of Mathematics, Department of Natural Sciences, Department of Physical Education, and Department of Social Science.

In terms of accreditation, the following programs are Level III 1st Re-accredited by the Philippine Association of Colleges and University Commission On Accreditation (PACUCOA): AB Mass Communication, AB Journalism, and AB Legal Studies while BS Psychology has been granted Level III Re-accredited Status.

The CAS has for its main thrust the development of its faculty, staff and students. This is achieved through faculty development seminars, classroom visitations, regular faculty meetings and periodic conferences with the Department Chairs.

The college also helps the Communication and Public Affairs Department (CPAD) in its promotion/marketing activities through the annual Brain Quest, JPL Cup and Media Forum regularly attended by public and private high schools in Metro Manila.

In 2014, the College of Arts and Sciences conducted the 1st UmalohokJUAN Awards, recognizing and awarding television and radio programs and personalities.

=== College of Business Administration ===
Business Administration program is granted Level 3 1st Reaccredited Status by PACUCOA
Accountancy and Customs Administration program are granted Level 1 Formal Accredited Status by PACUCOA

==== History ====
In 1952, José P. Laurel opened the School of Commerce, headed by Senator Gil J. Puyat as its first dean, with Hilarion M. Henares as the vice dean. In 1955, the school graduated 53 students who joined the public and private sectors.

The School of Commerce was later expanded and became the School of Economics and Business Administration. In 1976, it became the College of Business Administration.

It produced seven topnotchers in the CPA Board Examination since 1992 and 14 in the Customs Brokers Licensure Examination since 1999.

=== College of Technology ===
Computer Science and Information Technology programs are granted Level 3 Reaccredited Status by PACUCOA.

==== History ====
In June 2001, the university decided to establish the College of Computer Studies (CCS) to cater to a rapidly increasing demand for IT Professionals. During the previous five years in which it was offered, the BS Computer Science Program had been under the administration of the College of Engineering (COE). When Lyceum decided to offer other Information Technology courses, the new college was established. By adding at least three new courses related to the Information Technology industry, Lyceum separated the Computer Science students from COE to set up the College of Computer Studies (CCS).

In 2015, the College of Computer Studies (CCS) and College of Engineering (COE) was merged and named College of Technology (COT).

=== College of International Tourism Hospitality Management ===
==== History ====
In order to accommodate the increase in student population, and put together common resources and faculty, the College of International Hospitality Management (CIHM) was founded in November 1998. It was the first in the Philippines to use the appellation International Hospitality Management, the CIHM offered the BS HRM program, initially offered by the College of Business Administration (CBA) and the Bachelor of Science in Tourism (BST), originally under the College of Arts and Sciences (CAS).

The establishment of CIHM was introduced to the Council of Hotel and Restaurant Educators of the Philippines (COHREP), a professional organization of educators in the HRM program and to the Hotel and Restaurant Association of the Philippines (HRAP), a professional organization of hotels and restaurant industry members in 1999. In 2002, the CIHM also endeavored membership in the Tourism Educators in Schools, Colleges and Universities (TESCU). Participation was inactive after the first few years but in August 2009, the college joined the competitions sponsored by the organization with its new name, Union of Filipino Tourism Educators (UFTE) and has remained active since then.

CITHM Laboratory classes are in Le Cafe, an on-campus restaurant operated by students, frequented by the academic community and its guests, and a fully equipped mini hotel with a reception area, hotel suite and a housekeeping area. Aside from these, there are two mock hotel rooms that classes may use in teaching basic competencies in housekeeping. Supporting the development of skills in food and baking production, ample hands-on experiences are provided in the food laboratories, one with a basic kitchen design of ten stations, and the other laboratory with an institutional kitchen design that is close to restaurant kitchen designs, with seven stations. There are also three demonstrations laboratories, with two stations, used by the food laboratory classes from time to time. A beverage laboratory complete with a functional bar is also provided for hands-on learning on various beverage preparation and service techniques. A mock bar room has also been prepared for their increasing number of classes in Bar Management and Food & Beverage Service classes.

Students are also given industry computer applications using various programs such as Amadeus, Opera and an in-house front office software program. In lecture classes, the multimedia approach is used. The International Practicum Training Program is done through arrangements with local agencies and its partner agencies which coordinate with various establishments in Singapore and the United States of America.

In school year 2009–2010, the college's name was changed from CIHM to CITHM or College of International Tourism and Hospitality Management, connected to M.G.M. Hotels Holdings, U.S.A. CITHM has won awards in the Philippines Culinary Cup and has hosted the yearly activity. The CITHM received accreditation for its BSHRM and BSTourism programs from COHREP. The Bay Leaf Hotel is a project of the Lyceum CITHM. A new Bay Leaf Hotel is located in L.P.U. Cavite city.

=== College of International Relations ===
==== History ====
The College of International Relations started out as the School of Foreign Service. It was administratively under the College of Arts and Sciences (CAS). It initially offered the Bachelor of Science in Foreign Service (BSFS) degree in School Year (SY) 1954–55, as authorized by the Department of Education under Recognition No. 35 Series of 1954. A total number of 1,000 enrollees in SY 1959-60 prompted its separatione from the CAS. José P. Laurel became the acting dean of the newly separated School of Foreign Service. It was later renamed College of Foreign Service. In 2005, the college was further renamed College of International Relations (CIR).

Since its establishment, the college had in its roster professors and teaching staff that included the late President Diosdado Macapagal, who became a Special Lecturer teaching Philippine Foreign Relations in 1969. Ten years later, former ambassador to the Holy See, Alberto Katigbak, in his capacity as dean of the college, initiated revisions to the BSFS curriculum.

The syllabi of practically all the CIR subjects have undergone revisions to bring them up to date, including Diplomatic Practice, Introduction to International Relations, Philippine Foreign Relations, Protocol and Etiquette, and International Organizations.

To strengthen the CIR faculty, new chairpersons were appointed. Ambassador Josue L. Villa, former Philippine ambassador to Thailand and to the People's Republic of China, joined in April 2006 as chairperson of the Department of Politics, Government and Diplomacy, and Ambassador Alfredo Almendrala, former Philippine ambassador to Myanmar and Consul General in San Francisco, as chairperson of the Department of International Trade, in addition to their appointment as special lecturer.

In addition to long-time professors Ambassador Dolores Sale, Ambassador Fortunato Oblena, and General Cesar Fortuno, new professors were added to the faculty: Ambassador Apolinario Lozada, Jr., Ambassador Phoebe Gómez; Ambassador Nestor Padalhin; Ruby Sakkam, a summa cum laude graduate of St. Scholastica College; and Gil Santos, veteran journalist and former bureau chief of Associated Press. Ambassador Aladin Villacorte, former Consul General of the Philippine Consulate General in Chicago and Consul General of the Philippine Consulate General in Xiamen, P.R. of China; Ambassador Emelinda Lee-Pineda and Ambassador Estrella Berenguel have also joined the faculty recently.

=== College of Nursing ===
Granted Level 2 1st Reaccredited Status by PACUCOA

On July 16, 2002, Perla Rizalina M. Tayco, Ph.D., an OD consultant, was commissioned by the president of Lyceum of Philippines, Roberto P. Laurel, to assist the institution in the Strategic Visioning Process towards the establishment of the College of Nursing. The application for Government Permit to operate the Bachelor of Science in Nursing was granted on the following dates.

=== College of Law ===
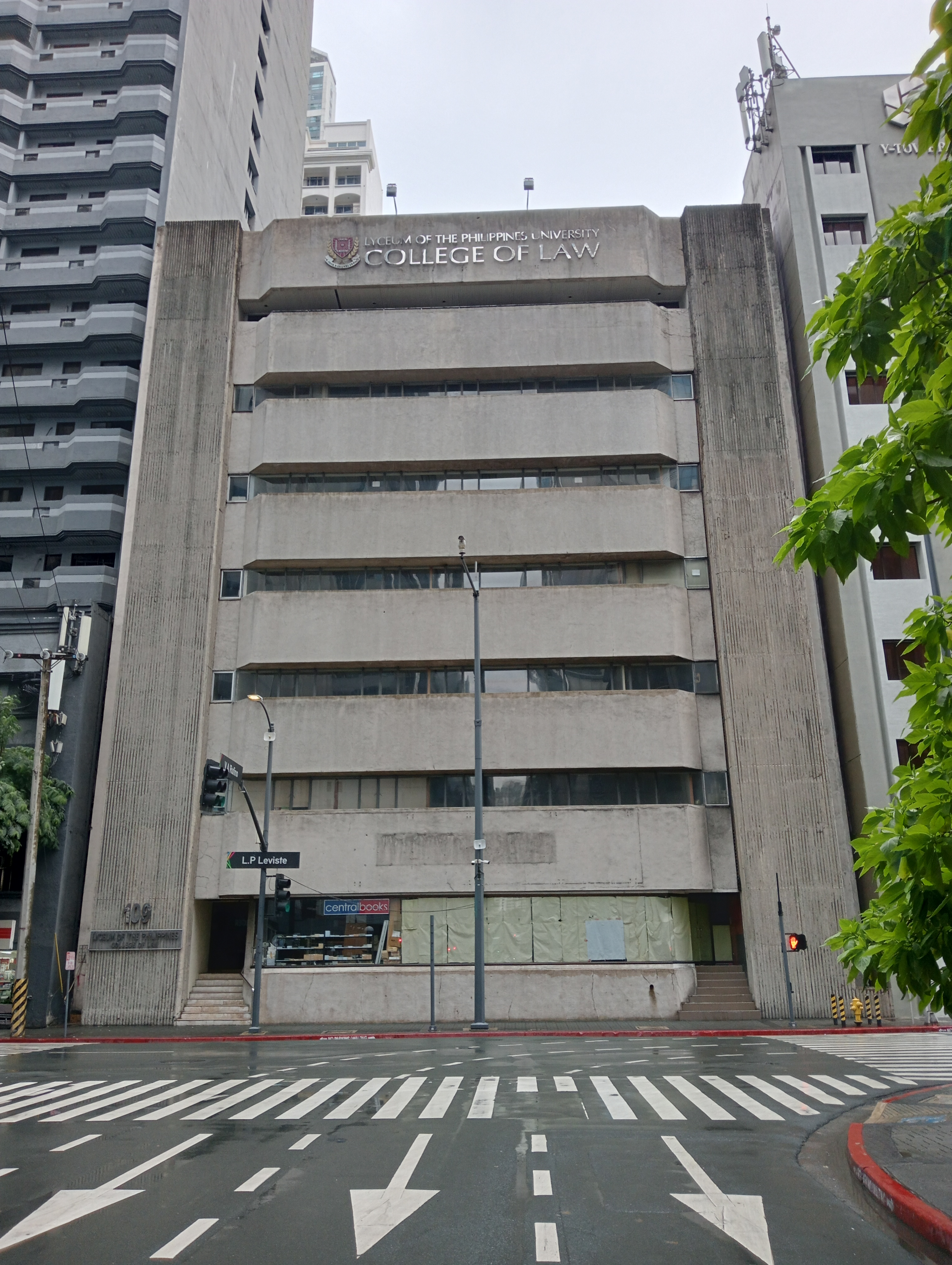
LPU Makati Campus

The College of Law has a separate campus in Salcedo Village, Makati, known as the Lyceum of the Philippines University – Makati Campus or Lyceum of the Philippines University College of Law.

=== Claro M. Recto Academy of Advanced Studies (CMR-AAS) ===
Public Administration and Business Administration master programs are granted Level 2 1st Reaccredited Status by PACUCOA.

== Campuses and affiliated institutions ==
The Lyceum of the Philippines University has six major campuses, namely:

- LPU Manila in Intramuros, Manila, the main campus of the university
- LPU Makati at L.P. Leviste Street, Makati, houses the LPU College of Law
- LPU Batangas in Batangas City, Batangas, formerly an autonomous institution named Lyceum of Batangas
- LPU Laguna. in Calamba, Laguna, formerly an autonomous institution named Lyceum Institute of Technology
- LPU Cavite in General Trias, dubbed as "the first and only resort campus in the Philippines
- LPU Davao at C.P. Garcia Highway (Diversion Road), Sun City, Buhangin, Davao City, the first LPU campus outside Luzon

=== High schools ===
- LPU International High School-Cavite Constructed as LPU Manila's High School Department.
- LPU International High School-Batangas LPU Batangas' High School Department, which will be located in Batangas City and was scheduled to open in June 2013. It holds the mission of "Shaping Young Minds to Take the Lead!".
- LPU International High School-Laguna Opened in June 2013 in response of the K-12 DepEd program.

=== Other LPU-related autonomous institutions of higher learning ===
- LPU – St. Cabrini College of Allied Medicine, a joint effort between the Laguna campus of Lyceum of the Philippines University and St. Frances Cabrini Medical Center in Santo Tomas, Batangas.
- Lyceum International Maritime Academy abbreviated as LIMA, located in LPU Batangas, which offers maritime education.
- LPU Culinary Institute located at Intramuros, Manila.

== Notable alumni ==
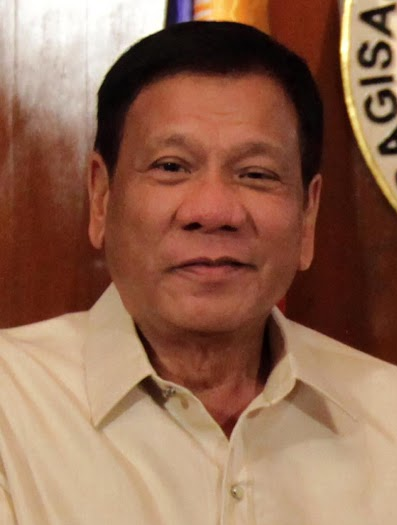
President Rodrigo Duterte

- Rodrigo Duterte, 16th President of the Philippines, former mayor of Davao City

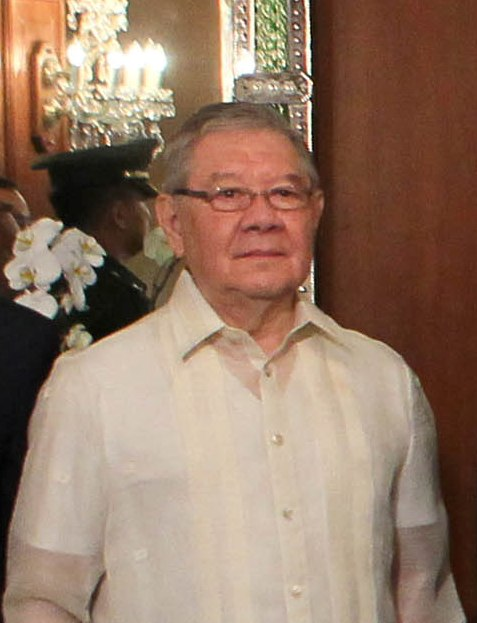
Feliciano Belmonte, Jr.

- Feliciano Belmonte, Jr., representative of Quezon City's 4th District, former Speaker
- Jinggoy Estrada, incumbent Philippine Senator
- Alexander Gesmundo, 27th Chief Justice of the Philippines
- Panfilo Lacson, former director-general of the Philippine National Police; current Philippine Senator
- Robert Barbers, former Philippine Senator and Secretary of Interior and Local Government
- Ernesto Herrera, former Philippine Senator
- Bienvenido Laguesma, Secretary of the Department of Labor and Employment
- Epimaco Velasco, former NBI Director
- Antonio Leviste, former Batangas Governor
- Grace Padaca, COMELEC commissioner and former governor of Isabela
- Jaime Fresnedi, Congressman of Muntinlupa, Former Mayor of Muntinlupa
- Cristy Fermin, showbiz columnist, TV host, radio anchor
- Satur Ocampo, activist, journalist, writer, former Bayan Muna representative
- Joel Lamangan, film and television director
- Rene O. Villanueva, playwright and author; multi-Palanca awardee
- Gary David, PBA player, Gilas Pilipinas player
- Chico Lanete, PBA player
- Ato Agustin, former PBA player; former head coach of the San Sebastian Stags in the NCAA; former head coach of Barangay Ginebra San Miguel in the PBA
- Leo Austria, former PBA player; 6-time champion, head coach of the San Miguel Beermen
- Joey Mente, former PBA player; 2001 PBA Slamdunk Champion
- Henry Omaga-Diaz, news anchor and reporter, ABS-CBN News
- Gus Abelgas, news anchor and reporter, ABS-CBN News
- Susan Enriquez, news anchor, host and reporter, GMA News
- Cesar Montano, film and television actor
- Jolo Revilla, film and television actor; Vice Governor of Cavite
- Louise delos Reyes, film and television actress
- Dino Imperial, film and television actor
- Enzo Pineda, film and television actor
- Dikki John Martinez, former National Figure Skating Champion; Disney on Ice skater
- Johan Santos, film and television actor; former Pinoy Big Brother housemate
- Paul Jake Castillo, actor; former Pinoy Big Brother housemate
