= Lyceum Central Student Government =

Student governing body in the Philippines

- Abbreviation: LYCESGO
- Formation: 2009
- Location: General Trias, Cavite
- President VP Internal VP External Secretary Treasurer Auditor Bus. Mngr. PRO: Ma. Patricia Diaz; Hae Maureen Carbonel; Julian Grayfrex Alcomendas; Arianne Mae Manipol; Patricia Ann Caballero; John Paul Sui; Sean Kemp Laqui; Fleford Lariosa
- Website: facebook.com/LYCESGOCavite

The Lyceum Central Student Government, also known as the LYCESGO, is the highest student governing body of Lyceum of the Philippines University-Cavite Campus, located at General Trias, Cavite. It is composed of eight officers and their respective committees. Its principal concern is the promotion of welfare and protection of student rights.

== Executive officers ==
| Year | President | VP Internal | VP External | Secretary | Treasurer | Auditor | Business Manager | P.R.O. |
|---|---|---|---|---|---|---|---|---|
| 2026-2027 | Carl Francis Bergundo | Aaron Kurg Balisi | Anna Ayezsa Mangi | Eunice Guirre | N/A** | N/A** | N/A** | N/A** |
| 2025-2026 | Lebron James Alvarez | Joanna May Banaag | Tanya Lux Mamaradlo | Rosanna Alexa Yumol | (1st semester) Shaneiah Torcelero (2nd semester) Carl Francis Bergundo | (1st semester) Allyza Ablaza (2nd semester) Clara Mariano | (1st semester) Gabriel Joseph Longakit (2nd semester) Audrey Ann Sari Serrano | (1st semester) Lyssa Mae Quila (2nd semester) Mark Risen Caparas |
| 2024-2025 | Angelo Rafael Esdrelon | (1st semester) Mark Angelo Angcanan (2nd semester) Lebron James Alvarez | Lance Pagdanganan | Alexandra Ambunan | Alyssa Mae Torres | Raine Jillian Joy Domingo | N/A* | Princess Abigail Batalla |
| 2023-2024 | Gwyneth Andrey Basilla | Wiljane Marianette Flores | Jherome Ashley Trinidad | Mekaella Denice Biñas | Angelo Rafael Esdrelon | Julius Harvey Gonzalo | N/A* | Dein Dela Cruz Sullano |
| 2022-2023 | Julian Grayfex Alcomedas | Maria Jhoneila Alejandro | John Paul Sui | Amber Mendoza | Arianne Mae Manipol | Julliana Helena Dasig | Gwyneth Andrey Basilia | Allen Dave Veras |
| 2020-2022 | Maria Patricia Flores | Hae Maureen Carbonel | Julian Grayfrex Alcomendas | Arianne Mae Manipol | Patricia Ann Caballero | John Paul Sui | Sean Kemp Laqui | Fleford Lariosa |
| 2012–2013 | Josem Arie Pabion | Roger Indelible, Jr. | Ailene Abad | Mark Kevin Javate | Apple Jaurigue | Sheillybeth Jacob | Aeron Louise Sosa | Arnold Glenn Bolosan |
| 2011–2012 | Josem Arie Pabion | Daren Dale Angeles | Charmelle Mutia | Hermae Aquines | Ailene Abad | Czarina Danganan | Roi Allen Amurao | Roger Indelible, Jr. |
| 2010–2011 | Jamie Glo Saquilayan | Darwin Palencia | Elizabeth Collins | Josem Arie Pabion & Melody Masculino | Angeline Rafael | Jerica Porto | Exquiel John Castro | John Elver Pescasio |
| 2008–2010 | Reymon Quillao | Jamie Glo Saquilayan | Cassandra May German | Anna Theresa Dionco | Albert Muyar | Laarni Miong | Erniel Mervin Aranzanzo | Aljay Saraga |

*The position of Business Manager did not exist during academic years 2023-2024 and 2024-2025.

**No officer was elected.

== LYCESGO Committees ==
The Lyceum Central Student Government, since its formation on 2008, has been recruiting students from the university to be a part of the LYCESGO Committees. The LYCESGO Committees have played a vital and important role in LYCESGO, in its events and programs, and in the whole student body of the university as well. The names of the LYCESGO Committees have been revised for Academic Year 2012 - 2013.

=== Administrative Affairs Committee ===
Formerly known as the Executive Committee, the Administrative Affairs Committee is under the supervision of the LYCESGO President. Its main function is to monitor the whole government and report the happenings inside the system. Together with the Committee on Students Welfare, AAC monitors the situation happening in the student body.

=== Internal Affairs Committee ===
Formerly known as the Internal Committee, the Internal Affairs Committee is under the supervision of the LYCESGO Vice President for Internal Affairs. Its main function is to supervise all the internal matters in the student body relating on student affairs, campus organization, finance monitoring, fellowship and brotherhood and rules and regulations.

=== External Relations Committee ===
Formerly known as the External Committee, the External Relations Committee is under the supervision of the LYCESGO Vice President for External Affairs. Its main function is to take charge of the external relations of LYCESGO, and of the matters pertaining to conventions, ceremonials, programs, public events and awards.

=== Secretariat Committee ===
The Secretariat Committee is under the supervision of the LYCESGO Secretary. Its main function is to keep accurate minutes of LYCESGO meetings. The committee, spearheaded by the LYCESGO Secretary shall also be the custodians of the records, documents and papers of LYCESGO, and shall take charge of official correspondence.

=== Financial Committee ===
Formerly known as the Financial 1 Committee, the Financial Committee is under the supervision of the LYCESGO Treasurer. Its main function is to keep and accurate and effective record of all receipts and expenses of LYCESGO and shall help the LYCESGO Treasurer in submitting a per-event financial report. All financial matters shall be handled by the committee in full supervision of the LYCESGO Treasurer.

=== Audit and Evaluation Committee ===
Formerly known as the Financial 2 Committee, Audit and Evaluation Committee is under the supervision of the LYCESGO Auditor. Its main function is to help the LYCESGO Auditor in auditing the financial reports made by the LYCESGO Treasurer. The Committee shall examine the correctness of the report. In addition, the committee shall evaluate every program and event of LYCESGO and shall pass an Evaluation Report to LYCESGO no later than 2 weeks after the event.

=== Students Welfare Committee ===
The Students Welfare Committee is under the supervision of the LYCESGO Business Manager. Its main function is to monitor the situation happening in the student body, with the help of the Administrative Affairs Committee. The Committee shall take charge of mapping out the general activities of LYCESGO. Furthermore, the committee shall prepare all necessary plans and studies the perceived outcome of the event.

=== Public Information Committee ===
Formerly known as the Publicity Committee, the Public Information Committee is under the supervision of the LYCESGO Public Relations Officer. Its main function is to take charge in all press releases, publications and public relation activities of LYCESGO.

== Notable Projects ==
Since its formation on 2008, the Lyceum Central Student Government creates different university-wide and college-based (through the CSG's) activities that mainly focuses on the Recreational, Academic, Social and Environmental aspects of the University.

=== Lyceum SuperStar ===
With the goal of discovering new breed of Lycean talents, the 1st Lyceum SuperStar was held last January 21, 2012 at the University Grounds. Parokya ni Edgar gave a ground-breaking performance that was enjoyed by the LPU Community, as well as the outsiders and guests. In the end, Gem Aquino, a freshman from the College of Business Administration was named as the 1st Lyceum SuperStar.

=== Resort Rock ===
Resort Rock: Battle of the Bands 2011 was held last January 22, 2011 at the University Grounds. 12 different bands fought for the title but in the end, Function of Ex took home the top prize. Vice Ganda performed live on stage at the last sequence of the show before the awarding.

=== Acquaintance Party 2k10 ===
Acquaintance Party 2k10 is considered as the most memorable acquaintance party in LPU Cavite and was a joint project of LYCESGO, CAS-SG, CCS-SG and COE-SG. The event featured Callalily as one of the guest performers alongside LPU Cavite student and tween star Louise delos Reyes.

=== Your Hue, Guess Who, It's You! ===
This is the 2011 Acquaintance Party that was a joint project of CAS-SG, CoECS-SG and CBA-SG.

=== CITHM Pirates Night ===
The 2011 Acquaintance Party/Costume Party of the College of International Tourism and Hospitality Management.

=== LPU Garage Sale ===
This project is being spearheaded by LYCESGO annually. The LPU Garage Sale is a week-long event that intends to sell forfeited and second-hand items like books to students in a mega-low price.

=== Refresh ===
A three-day tutorial programme spearheaded by LYCESGO and the Lambda Sigma Kappa or the LPU Scholastic Society.

=== Mr. and Ms. LPU Cavite ===
Since 2009, LYCESGO has been a major part of the search for the Mr. and Ms. LPU Cavite. This pageant aims to seek for the most beautiful women and most handsome men in the campus that can characterize a good role model among the students of the University and uplift the camaraderie among the colleges of LPU Cavite. Below are the list of the title-holders of the pageant:

| Year | Mr. LPU Cavite | Ms. LPU Cavite |
|---|---|---|
| 2012 | Djan Karlo Lasquete (CAS) | Arianne Hernandez (CAS) |
| 2011 | Daren Dale Angeles (CITHM) | Baby Hannah Lacerna (CITHM) |
| 2010 | Kristian Paez (CAS)* Didier Flores (CBA)** | Mary Grace Perido (CAS) |
| 2009 | Lionel Angeles (CITHM)* Ryan Cuid (CCS)** | Jamie Glo Saquilayan (CAS) |

NOTE: names marked with * are originally crowned as a runner-up but embodied the title until the next pageant because the then-crowned title holder (marked with **) did not perform his respective duties and responsibilities due to personal or academic reasons.

=== LYCESGO Echo Seminar ===
The LYCESGO Echo Seminar happened last September 22, 2011 where the LYCESGO Officers echoed the insights from the different seminars and national conventions they have attended to the other student leaders of the University. Guest speakers of the said event were Mr. Mark M. Javier, (Head, Student Affairs Office), Ms. Deborah May Torrecampo (Guidance Counselor) and Mr. Richardson dR. Mojica (CAS Faculty and Ayala Young Leaders Award recipient)

=== Other Events ===
Minor events and Special events that caters to the students needs were also driven and supported by LYCESGO.

1. Tugma: Photo Exhibit
2. Lagpas: 1st MMA Photoexhibit
3. LPU High School Conference
4. Tree Growing Commitments
5. LPU Induction of Officers
6. Freshmen Orientation

== LPU Student Organizations ==
Aside from LYCESGO, each college also has their respective College Student Government (CSG) and there are other officially recognized student organizations in LPU Cavite. The collective aim of which is to develop responsible and creative student leaders who will eventually assume leadership in their chosen careers. The student organizations encourage activities with clearly established goals and which flow among social, cultural, religious, literary, educational and recreational lines.

=== College of Arts and Sciences ===
1. College of Arts and Sciences Student Government (CAS-SG)
2. Association of Education Students (ASSETS)
3. LPU Legal Studies Society (LSS)
4. LPU League of Young Communicators (LPU LYC)

=== College of Business Administration ===
1. College of Business Administration Student Government (CBA-SG)
2. Junior Philippine Institute of Accountancy - LPU Cavite Chapter (JPIA - LPU Cavite)

=== College of Engineering, Computer Studies and Architecture ===
1. College of Engineering, Computer Studies and Architecture Student Government (CoECSA-SG)
2. LPU Engineering Students Society (LPUESS)
3. Computer Studies Society (CSS)

=== College of International Tourism and Hospitality Management ===
1. College of International Tourism and Hospitality Management Student Government (CITHM-SG)
2. LPU Guild of Culinary Arts Students (LGCAS)
3. LPU International Hospitality Management Society (LIHMS)
4. LPU International Travel and Tourism Society (LITTS)
5. CITHM Hoteliers Entrepreneurs and Restaurateurs Organization of Exemplified Students (CITHM HEROES)

=== College of Nursing ===
1. College of Nursing Student Government (CON-SG)

=== University-wide Organizations ===
1. The Laurel Leaf (Official Student Publication of LPU Cavite)
2. Graduate Student Council
3. Students in Free Enterprise - LPU Cavite Chapter (SIFE - LPU Cavite)
4. Lyceum Kuro Neko Anime Club (LYKNEKO)
5. Society of United Lyceans for Christ (Souls for Christ)
6. Society of United Nations

=== Arts and Cultural Affairs Department (ArtCAD) ===
1. LPU Cavite Dance Company
2. LPU Harmonic Chorale
3. LPU Intense Characters of ON-ramp Students (LPU ICONS)
4. LPU Musikeros
5. LPU Symphonic Band
6. LPU Sining ng Arte at Galaw (LPU SinAG)

== Student Political Parties ==
There are two known and official student political parties in LPU Cavite.

1. Ilustrado
2. Kagitingan
