= AC Industrials =

Philippine technology company

AC Industrial Technology Holdings Inc.
- Trade name: AC Industrials
- Type: Private (subsidiary)
- Industry: electronics manufacturing; automotive retail; enabling technologies
- Founded: August 15, 2016; 10 years ago
- Headquarters: 34th Floor, Tower One & Exchange Plaza, Makati Central Business District, Makati, Philippines
- Key people: Jaime Augusto Zobel de Ayala; (Chairman); Arthur R. Tan; (Director & CEO)
- Parent: Ayala Corporation
- Subsidiaries: Integrated Micro-Electronics; AC Automotive; MT Technologies; Merlin Solar; KTM Asia Motorcycle Manufacturing
- Website: www.acindustrialtech.com.ph

AC Industrial Technology Holdings Inc. or simply AC Industrials is Ayala Corporation's holding company for its current and future investments in industrial technology. It is formerly known as Ayala Automotive Holdings Corporation before the change in name in August 2016. The core businesses under AC Industrials are Integrated Micro-Electronics, a global technology company in the Philippines and one of the top automotive EMS provider worldwide (based on revenues), and AC Motors, a multi-brand dealership group and vehicle distributor carrying Honda, Isuzu, Kia, Volkswagen and KTM.

AC Industrials' automotive group has minority of investments in automotive manufacturing in Honda Cars Philippines and Isuzu Philippines Corporation. Also, through AC Industrials' wholly owned subsidiaries, the group has eleven Honda dealerships, nine Isuzu dealerships, and four Volkswagen dealerships. It is also the official importer and distributor of Volkswagen for the Philippines. It also entered into the motorcycle business in 2016 in partnership with KTM to manufacture and distribute its products in the Philippines (nineteen dealerships) and export markets in Asia.

== Subsidiaries ==
AC Industrials operates with different business entities within automotive and industrial technology portfolio. These companies varies from industrial manufacturing to automotive dealerships.

- Integrated Micro-Electronics (IMI) – 51%
  - Surface Technology International Ltd. (STI)
- AC Automotive Business Services, Inc.
- Isuzu Automotive Dealership, Inc. (IADI) 15%
  - Isuzu Cebu, Inc.
  - Isuzu Iloilo Corp.
  - Isuzu Benguet Corp.
- KTM Philippines
  - Adventure Cycle Philippines (ACPI)
    - KTM Asia Motorcycle Manufacturing (KAMMI) – 66%
- Columbian Autocar – 65%
  - Kia Philippines
- Merlin Solar Technologies
- MT Technologies Gmbh
