= Lyceum of the Philippines University – Laguna =

Private university in Laguna, Philippines

- Pamantasang Liseo ng Pilipinas sa Laguna (Filipino)
- Former name: Lyceum Institute of Technology (2000-)
- Motto: Veritas et Fortitudo, Pro Deo et Patria (Latin)
- Motto in English: Truth and Courage, For God and Country
- Type: Private Non-sectarian satellite campus Coeducational Higher education institution
- Established: January 18, 2000; 26 years ago
- Academic affiliations: ASAIHL, IiP, PQA, AACSB, COCOPEA, CoTS, LACUAA, UCCL, SLCUAA,
- President: Peter P. Laurel
- Location: Km. 54, National Highway, Makiling, Calamba, Laguna, Philippines; 14°09′32″N 121°08′15″E
- Campus: Urban satellite campus 12 hectares (120,000 m^{2})
- Alma Mater song: Awit ng Lyceum (The Lyceum Hymn)
- Newspaper: Voyage
- Colors: Red Gray
- Nickname: Lycean
- Sporting affiliations: NCAA
- Mascot: Pirates
- Website: www.lpulaguna.edu.ph

- Location in Laguna Location in Luzon Location in the Philippines

The Lyceum of the Philippines University – Laguna (formerly Lyceum Institute of Technology), one of the campuses of the Lyceum of the Philippines University, is an institute of higher education located in Km. 54, Brgy. Makiling, Calamba in the province of Laguna, Philippines. It was founded by Senator Sotero H. Laurel on January 18, 2000 as the third campus of the LPU system after Manila and Batangas.

Currently, Lyceum of the Philippines University has 43 degree, non-degree, masters, and doctorate programs to offer.

== Institution ==
The university offers undergraduate and graduate programs in various fields, including computer studies, engineering, arts, business, accountancy, tourism, hospitality management and medicine.

=== Palaestra Consortio ===
Palaestra Consortio, which is Latin term for “Training Partner”, is the industry linkage arm of Lyceum. It provides for student on-the-job training and internship programs, job placement programs, and meetings and consultations with industry leaders.

The major industry partners of Lyceum are Yazaki-Torres Manufacturing Inc, a manufacturer of wiring and other automotive parts, and St. Frances Cabrini Medical Center, which led to the formation of LPU-St. Cabrini College of Allied Medicine, a joint effort between LPU-Laguna and St. Cabrini.

Recently in 2025, LPU Laguna gained Autonomous Status from the Commission on Higher Education, thus demonstrating its high-quality education, excellent program status, and recognized as a regional leader in education.

== Rankings and International Linkages ==
As part of the Lyceum of the Philippines network, LPU-L along with the other LPU campuses namely Manila, Makati, Batangas, Cavite, and Davao are ranked in THE Impact Rankings - 1501+, Good Health & Wellbeing - 1001+, Quality Education - 1001-1500, Gender Equality - 401-600, and Partnership for the Goals - 1001-1500.

Moreover, it is ranked =140 in the Asian University Rankings - South Eastern Asia, and 801-850 Asia-wide. LPU in its whole received varying QS Stars; 4-stars Overall, and in Good Governance, Diversity, Equity & Inclusion, and Specialist Criteria: Hospitality & Leisure Management. 3-stars for Teaching, 2-stars for Global Engagement, 5-stars for employability, facilities, and social impact, and a star for research.

LPU-Laguna itself has different linkages to various higher educational institutions in the world, such notable example is the School of Engineering's Inter-faculty and Exchange Partnership with the School of Engineering of the University of Osaka.

== Colleges ==
=== LPU - St. Cabrini School of Health Sciences ===
- Bachelor of Science in Medical Laboratory Science
- Bachelor of Science in Radiologic Technology
- Bachelor of Science in Nursing
- Bachelor of Science in Pharmacy
- Doctor of Optometry
- Doctor of Medicine

=== College of Arts and Sciences ===
- Bachelor of Arts in Communication
- Bachelor of Arts in Multimedia Arts
- Bachelor of Science in Psychology
- Bachelor of Science is Biology

=== College of Business and Accountancy ===
Certified Member of Association to Advance Collegiate Schools of Business or AACSB

- Bachelor of Science in Accountancy
- Bachelor of Science in Legal Management
- Bachelor of Science in Business Administration
  - BSBA Management Accounting
  - BSBA Marketing Management
  - BSBA Operations Management
  - BSBA Financial Management
  - BSBA People Management
  - BSBA Business Economics
- Bachelor of Science in Entrepreneurship
- Bachelor of Science in Customs Administration

=== College of Engineering and Computer Studies ===
- Bachelor of Science in Civil Engineering
- Bachelor of Science in Computer Engineering
- Bachelor of Science in Electrical Engineering
- Bachelor of Science in Industrial Engineering
- Bachelor of Science in Computer Science
- Bachelor of Science in Information Technology
- Bachelor of Science in Computer Science Major in Game Development
- Associate in Computer Technology

=== College of International Tourism and Hospitality Management ===
All programs accredited by The International Centre for Excellence in Tourism and Hospitality Education or THE-ICE

- Bachelor of Science in International Hospitality Management with specialization in:
  - Hotel and Restaurant Administration
  - Culinary Arts and Kitchen Operations
  - Cruise Line Operations in Hotel Services
  - Cruise Line Operations in Culinary Arts
- Bachelor of Science in International Travel and Tourism Management
- Associate in International Travel and Tourism Management
- Associate in Hotel and Restaurant Administration
- Associate in Culinary Arts in Kitchen Operations
- Associate in Hospitality Management

=== LPU Graduate School ===
- PhD in Management
- Master in Business Administration
- Master in Public Administration
- MA in English Language Studies
- MA in Information Technology Education
- MA in Educational Leadership and Management
- MA in Psychology
- MA in Industrial Engineering
- MS in Information Technology

=== LPU - Laguna International School ===
- Grade 7-10 Junior High School
- Grade 11-12 Senior High School

== Student Councils and Organizations ==
=== University-wide student organizations ===
- Lyceum Supreme Student Council
- Lyceum Pirates Dance Troupe
- Lyceum Concert Singers
- Lyceum Theatre Ensemble
- LPU-SC Junior Medical Laboratory Scientists
- Tatsulok Psychology Organization
- The Voyage
- Lyceum Music Circle
- Peer Facilitator's Society
- CFC-Youth for Christ LPU-Laguna Chapter
- Lyceum Kalikasan
- Youth in Action
- League of Warriors
- LPU-L General Engineering and Mathematics Society
- Mechatronics and Robotics Society of the Philippines LPU Laguna Chapter
- Junior Association of Business Managers
- Lyceum Filmmakers' Society
- International Students' Association

== See also ==
- Lyceum of the Philippines University - Batangas
- Lyceum of the Philippines University - Cavite
- José P. Laurel
