= Unilab =

Philippine pharmaceutical and consumer goods company

Unilab, Inc.
- Trade name: Unilab
- Formerly: United Drug Company, Inc. (1945–1953); United Laboratories, Inc. (1953–2005)
- Type: Subsidiary
- Industry: Pharmaceutical
- Founded: January 1, 1945; 81 years ago
- Founders: Jose Yao Campos; Mariano K. Tan
- Headquarters: 66 United Street, Mandaluyong, Metro Manila, Philippines
- Area served: Asia
- Key people: Jocelyn Campos Hess (Group Chairman of the Board); Clinton Campos Hess (Group President and CEO)
- Products: Medicines; Vitamins; Dietary supplements; Biotechnology
- Number of employees: 6,000 (2024)
- Parent: Unilab Group
- Subsidiaries: Amherst Laboratories; Amherst Parenterals; Amherst Nutraceuticals; Asian Antibiotics; Belmont Softgel Pharma Corporation; Bio-ONCO; Biofemme; Biomedis; LRI-Therapharma; Medichem; Pediatrica; United American Pharmaceuticals; Unilab Consumer Health; Westmont Pharmaceuticals
- Website: unilab.com.ph

Unilab Group
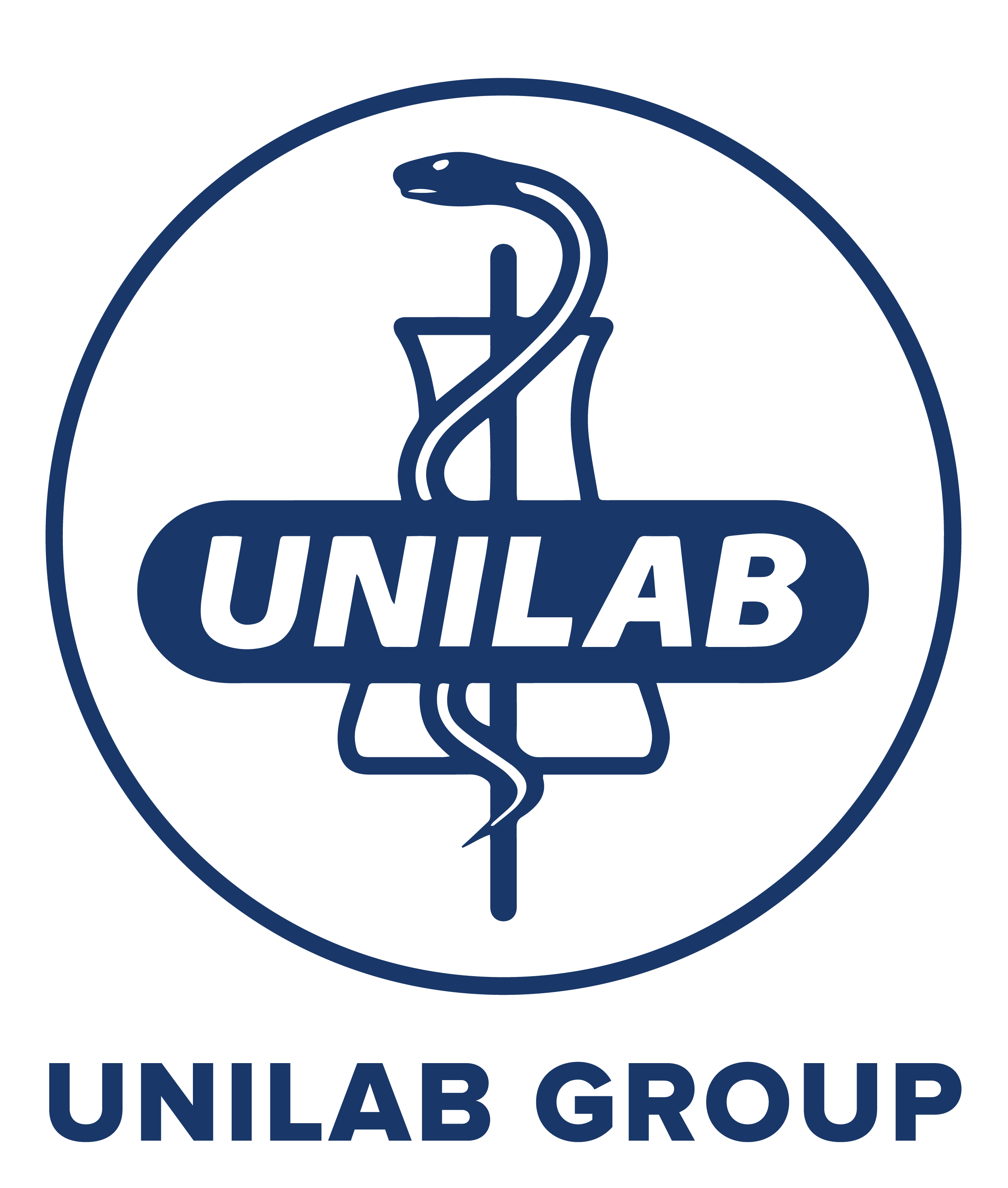
- The official logo of Unilab Group
- Type: Private
- Industry: Consumer goods
- Founded: January 1, 1945; 81 years ago (as United Laboratories, Inc.)
- Founders: Jose Yao Campos; Mariano K. Tan
- Headquarters: Mandaluyong, Metro Manila, Philippines
- Area served: Asia
- Key people: Jocelyn Campos Hess (Chairman of the Board); Clinton Campos Hess (President and CEO)
- Products: Medicines; Vitamins; Dietary supplements; Biotechnology; Beauty products
- Divisions: Unilab Foundation
- Subsidiaries: Unilab, Inc.; UL Skin Sciences, Inc.; RiteMED Phils., Inc.

Unilab, Inc., commonly known as Unilab (stylized in all caps), is a Philippine pharmaceutical company headquartered in Mandaluyong, Metro Manila. It specializes in a wide range of consumer healthcare products such as prescription and over-the counter medications, vitamins and food supplements, and biotechnology.

Unilab is the largest manufacturer of health products in the Philippines. It also has its own distribution center, First Pioneer Distribution, Inc., that enables logistical efficiencies in distributing its products nationwide. In 2008, Unilab became the first organization to receive the Philippine Quality Award for Performance Excellence, the highest national award for organizations that demonstrate "management excellence".

== History ==
Unilab was founded in 1945 as United Drug Co., Inc., a small drugstore on Sto. Cristo Street in Binondo, Manila. Over time, they renamed it United Laboratories, Inc. and changed to Unilab, Inc. to represent the pharmaceutical business.

It was co-founded by Jose Yao Campos and Mariano K. Tan. With the aid of Howard Q. Dee, Yao Campos' brother-in-law, the company significantly grew within its first 14 years of operations and by 1959, the business was already exporting its products to Hong Kong.

From the 1960s to the 2000s, Unilab established a presence in other countries including Cambodia, Indonesia, Thailand, and Vietnam.

In 2008, Unilab became the first recipient of the Philippine Quality Award (PQA) for Performance Excellence from the Department of Trade and Industry, the highest possible award for organizations that demonstrate "management excellence by the purposefulness with which it continues to improve and build upon outstanding results and excellent systems", and can "serve as a national and global model". It also remained the sole recipient of the award for more than a decade until Toyota Motor Philippines became its second awardee in 2021.

== Products ==
Unilab's products include branded over-the-counter and prescription medicines and vitamins such as Alnix, Allerta, Allerkid, Biogesic, Bioflu, Ceelin, Tiki-Tiki, Nutrilin, Appebon, Neozep Z+, Enervon Z+, Decolgen, Forti-D, Revicon Forte, Diatabs, Medicol, Growee, Solmux, Expel, Ferlin, Dolan, Conzace, Calciumade, Hemarate FA, Neurogen-E, ImmunPro, Alaxan XTRA, and United Home, among many others.

Under the Unilab Group is RiteMED Phils., Inc. which offers generic drug products through brands such as RiteMED and Pharex products including Pharex Generics, Enzymax Forte, Vaneular, and Glucopro. Also under the Unilab Group is UL Skin Sciences, Inc. which offers beauty and personal care products such as Myra, Celeteque, Fortima, Lactezin, GynePro, and pH Care.

== Subsidiaries ==
- Unilab Group
  - Unilab, Inc.
    - Amherst Laboratories, Inc.
    - Amherst Parenterals, Inc.
    - Amherst Nutraceuticals, Inc.
    - Asian Antibiotics, Inc.
    - Belmont Softgel Pharma Corporation
    - Bio-ONCO (Cancer Care)
    - Biofemme (Women's Health)
    - Biomedis (General Health)
    - LRI-Therapharma (Cardio-Metabolic)
    - Medichem (CNS)
    - Pediatrica (Pedia)
    - United American Pharmaceuticals (UAP) (Respiratory Health)
    - Unilab Consumer Health
    - Westmont Pharmaceuticals (General Health)
  - UL Skin Sciences, Inc.
  - RiteMED Phils., Inc.
    - Pharex Health Corp.
