= Lyceum of the Philippines University – Batangas =

Private university in Batangas, Philippines

- Pamantasang Liseo ng Pilipinas sa Batangas (Filipino)
- Former name: Lyceum of Batangas
- Motto: Veritas et Fortitudo, Pro Deo et Patria (Latin)
- Motto in English: Truth and Fortitude, For God and Country
- Type: Private Non-sectarian satellite campus Coeducational Secondary and Tertiary education institution
- Established: September 1966; 59 years ago
- Academic affiliations: AUAP
- President: Peter P. Laurel
- Students: 10,000
- Location: Batangas City, Batangas, Philippines; 13°45′49″N 121°03′54″E
- Campus: Urban satellite campus
- Alma Mater song: Awit ng Lyceum
- Colors: Red Gray
- Nickname: Pirates
- Sporting affiliations: UCAL, NCAA South
- Mascot: Pipo the Pirate
- Website: www.lpubatangas.edu.ph

- Location in Luzon Location in the Philippines

The Lyceum of the Philippines University–Batangas (formerly Lyceum of Batangas) is a higher education institution located in Capitol Site, Batangas City. It was founded by Sotero Laurel in 1966 using the educational philosophy of his father, former President José P. Laurel. Serving as the Lyceum of the Philippines University's affiliate satellite campus in the province of Batangas, its flagship courses were Nursing, Medical Technology, Marine Engineering, and Customs Administration. Now, Lyceum of the Philippines University has 42 degree & non-degree programs offerings. The school employs over 500 teaching and non-teaching personnel to cater to the needs of its 10,000 student population, the biggest amongst all Lyceum campuses.

== Institution ==
LPU Batangas enjoys autonomous status from the Commission on Higher Education. The university is also ISO 9001:2015 certified by Certification International (CI) and enjoys the Institutional Accreditation from the Philippine Association of Colleges and Universities Commission on Accreditation (PACUCOA) attributed to the number of LEVEL IV-Accredited Programs as follows: Accountancy, Business Administration, Marine Engineering, Marine Transportation, Information Technology, Hospitality and Tourism, Liberal Arts & Nursing programs. Relentless in giving justice to its "Take the Lead" tagline, Lyceum of the Philippines University in Batangas reaped another "first" as the Investors in People (IiP) Philippine Recognition Panel awards IiP recognition to the university and being the FIRST GOLD IiP-RECOGNIZED UNIVERSITY in the Philippines. Achieving the IiP Standard, LPU Batangas is the first academic institution to be IiP-recognized in the entire country. In December 2012, President Benigno S. Aquino III formally recognized Lyceum of the Philippines University – Batangas in the 15th Philippine Quality Award conferment ceremonies held in Malacañang Palace.

LPU Batangas is a member of the National Collegiate Athletic Association (Philippines) South.

== Colleges and Graduate School ==
- College of Allied Medical Professions
- College of Nursing
- College of Business Administration
- College of Computer Studies
- College of Education, Arts and Sciences
- College of International Tourism and Hospitality Management
- College of Criminal Justice Education
- College of Dentistry
- College of Engineering
- Lyceum International Maritime Academy
- LPU Graduate School
- LPU High School-Batangas
- Expanded Tertiary Education Equivalency & Accreditation Program (ETEEAP)

== See also ==
- Lyceum of the Philippines University-Laguna
- Lyceum of the Philippines University-Cavite
- Jose P. Laurel
