= Low pressure molding =

Low pressure molding (LPM) with polyamide and polyolefin (hot-melt) materials is a process typically used to encapsulate and environmentally protect electronic components (such as circuit boards). The purpose is to protect electronics against moisture, dust, dirt, and vibration. Low pressure molding is also used for sealing connectors and molding grommets and strain reliefs.

== Process ==
Key to low pressure molding are the raw materials and specialized molding equipment. Dimer acid based polyamide materials, better known as hot-melts, are used as molding compounds. They are thermoplastics i.e. the material, when heated, becomes less viscous and is able to be reshaped, then hardens to keep the desired form upon cooling down. These polyamide materials differ from other thermoplastics in two main areas:

1. Viscosity: at processing temperature 210 °C (410 °F) the viscosity is very low, typically around 3,000 centipoise (similar to pancake syrup). Low viscosity materials require low injection pressure in order to inject into a cavity. In fact it is normal to use a simple gear pump to inject the polyamide material. Low injection pressure is paramount, when over-molding relatively fragile electronic component.
2. Adhesion: polyamide materials are basically high performance hot-melt adhesives. The adhesive properties of polyamide is what seals a chosen substrate. The type of adhesion is purely mechanical i.e. no chemical reaction takes place.

The mainly used amorphous thermoplastic polyamides combine a favourable viscosity spectrum with a wide application temperature range from 50 to 150 °C or 122 to 302 °F. The material is heated until liquid (typically at 180 to 240 °C or 356 to 464 °F) and then injected at very low pressure, typically 3.5 to 14 bars (51 to 203 psi) into a relative cold mold-set. The low viscosity polyamide material flows gently into the mold-set cavity and around the electronics to be encapsulated. It also starts cooling down as soon as it touches the mold-set cavity and the electronics. A mold-set cavity is typically filled in a few seconds but a typical full molding cycle is 20 to 45 seconds. As the polyamide material starts to cool down it also starts to shrink. Continuous injection pressure is therefore applied to the cavity, even after its initial fill. This is done in order to compensate for the shrinkage that naturally occurs when the polyamide material goes from liquid to solid (i.e. hot to cold). The polyamide temperature is not too hot for the electronics and does not re-melt or re-flow the solder. This is simply because the relative cold mold-set will absorb the brunt of the heat, thereby reducing the temperature that a circuit board may see. Millions of circuit boards are successfully over-molded without causing any harm in the process. A low injection pressure does not stress a fragile solder joint.

== Uses ==
The low pressure molding process was initially used in Europe in the 1970s to seal connectors and create strain reliefs for wires. The first commercial use of the low pressure molding process was in the automotive industry. The driving force was to replace toxic and cumbersome potting processes, faster cycle times, lighter parts and environmentally safe components and for some applications to replace heat shrink tubings.

Since then low pressure molding has spread out to other areas such as industrial products, medical, consumer products, military, wire harness and any unique product that needs to be sealed and protected against the environment, like Automotive sensors in-cabin and even under hood, USB thumb drives, RFID tags, moisture sensors, motor control boards, consumer products. In essence the process acts as a middle ground between plastic injection molding, which subjects components to high pressure and temperatures that can often damage them, and potting with resin, a process that involves waste and lengthy curing times.

== Advantages ==
1. Protection: Provides excellent protection against environmental factors such as moisture, dust, and mechanical stress.
2. Speed: The process is faster compared to traditional potting methods, reducing cycle times and increasing productivity.
3. Cleanliness: LPM is a cleaner process as it minimizes waste and does not involve the use of harmful chemicals.
4. Cost-Effective: Lower material and processing costs compared to traditional potting methods.
5. Environmental Impact: LPM is considered an eco-friendly process as it uses less material, generates less waste, and eliminates the need for harmful potting compounds. The process contributes to a lower carbon footprint, aligning with Environmental, Social, and Governance (ESG) goals.

== See also ==
- Potting (electronics)
