= Lyceum of the Philippines University – Cavite =

Private university in Cavite,

- LPU CAVITE.png

The Lyceum of the Philippines University – Cavite (Filipino: Pamantasang Liseo ng Pilipinas – Kabite), also referred to by its acronym LPU – C, is a private, non-sectarian institute of higher education located in the City of General Trias, in the province of Cavite. The campus opened its doors to the public in 2008, serving as the fifth campus of the Lyceum of the Philippines University.

== History ==
LPU Cavite was established in June 2008. It is the fifth campus of the Lyceum of the Philippines University after the Manila, Makati, Batangas and Laguna campuses. It started with five colleges: the College of Allied Medical Sciences, College of Arts and Sciences, College of Business Administration, College of Engineering, Computer Studies and Architecture, and College of International Tourism and Hospitality Management and the College of Law. Due to the growing student population, LPU Cavite underwent expansion. In 2012, the fourth and fifth floors of LPU Cavite Phase II opened, connecting the Jose P. Laurel Building and the Sotero H. Laurel Building. This connection changed the shape of the campus from a semi-circle to a full circle. Phase II also houses the new Roman Catholic Chapel of the Sacred Heart of Jesus.

In 2013, LPU Cavite opened its College of Law under the supervision of LPU Makati. This is the second school of law in the LPU system and is the first law school in the province of Cavite.

== Accreditation ==
The university is the youngest school to be recognized as ISO 9001:2008 Quality Management System compliant by the Société Générale de Surveillance.

Four of its programs: the Business Administration, Hotel and Restaurant Management, Liberal Arts, and Science programs, were granted Level 3 Re-accredited Status by the Philippine Association of Colleges and Universities Commission on Accreditation. The remaining programs were given level 1 and to status.

== See also ==
- Lyceum Central Student Government
- Lyceum of the Philippines University–Batangas
- Lyceum of the Philippines University-Laguna
- Jose P. Laurel

== Gallery ==
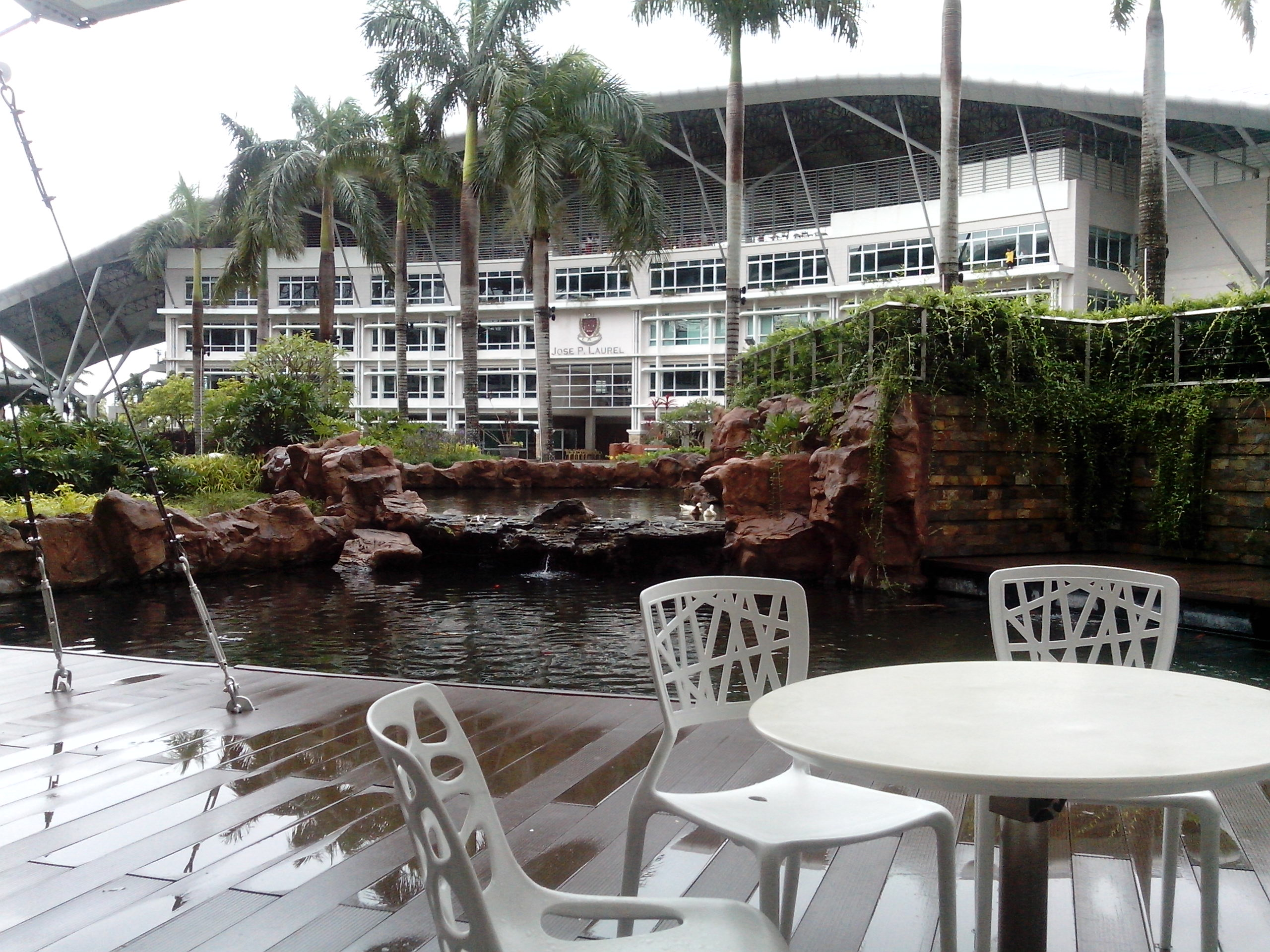
LPU Lagoon

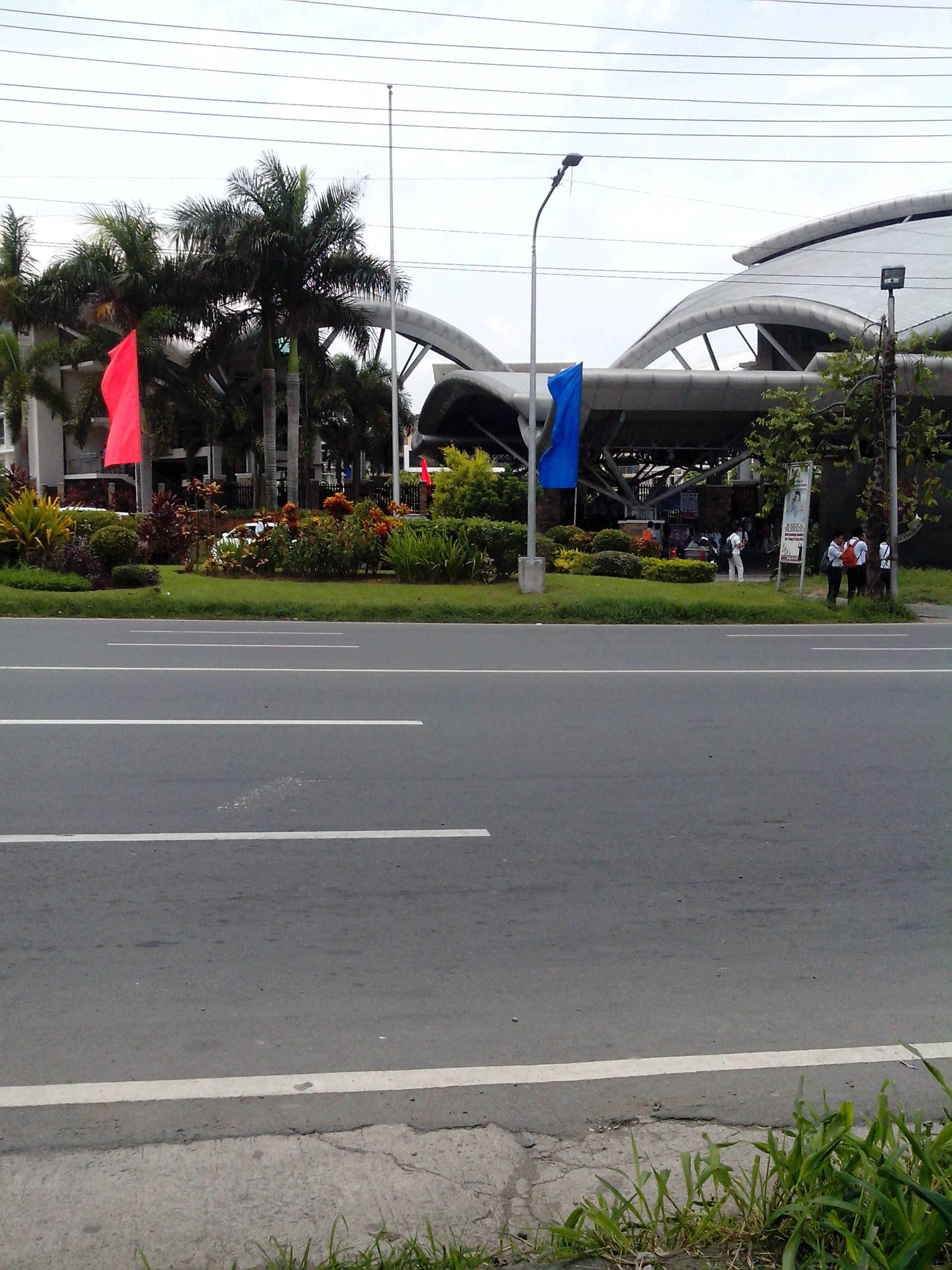
Facade
