= PSi Technologies =

Philippine semiconductor company

- Company type: Private
- Founded: Laguna, Philippines (1988)
- Headquarters: Carmelray Industrial Park II, Calamba, Laguna; Taguig, Metro Manila, Philippines
- Number of locations: 2 plants
- Parent: Integrated Micro-Electronics
- Website: www.global-imi.com/philippines/psi-technologies-laguna-inc

PSi Technologies provides power semiconductor assembly and test services to the power semiconductor market. It offers assembly services for power conversion and power management semiconductors; and design services to address power packaging needs of customers. The company also provides test services, including parametric, avalanche, reverse recovery time, integrated serial, and package isolation testing; and embossed carrier taping. In addition, it offers power packages and services designed for power semiconductors used in telecommunications and networking systems, computers and computer peripherals, consumer electronics, electronic office equipment, automotive systems, and industrial products. The company was founded in 1988 as Pacific Semiconductors Inc. (PSI) and is based in Laguna, the Philippines. RFM Corporation first invested in PSi technologies as a minority shareholder in the late 1980s, and became majority owner in 1995 only to be divested in 2001.

At present, PSi Technologies operates as a subsidiary of Integrated Micro-Electronics, Inc. PSi owns 40% of PSiTech Realty, the holding company of Pacsem Realty, which is a real estate company that acquires, holds, develops and disposes any real estate or interest acquired.

In 2010, Integrated Micro-Electronics, Inc. bought shares of PSi as part of a strategy to offer an integrated hybrid power solution in a multi-chip module that contains advanced manufacturing technologies. It allowed IMI to own majority or 56 percent of the power semiconductor company.

In 2012, Integrated Micro-Electronics bought out minority shareholders to increase their ownership of PSi Technologies to 100 percent.
