= Customer Service Assurance =

Customer Service Assurance (CSA) in telecom and Internet services means the collection of Communications Service Provider (CSP) customer usage information from all practical sources including network traffic, network devices, content servers, management databases and user devices to ensure customer service quality is consistent with CSP expectations.

== Overview ==
CSA involves, when needed, real-time monitoring of a customer’s purchased services and in analyzing this data to note trends, preferences, usage problems and eventually proactive assurance of customer-level or service-level issues. Companies that provide CSA software and technology to CSPs, include Subtonomy, Polystar, Accanto Systems, Telecordia, and Tekelec. Service assurance is model that is centered on the concept of maximizing customer satisfaction. The belief is that such practices inevitably maximize the long-term profitability of an organization or enterprise.

Numerous quality-regulating methods are often interwoven with CSA services. Under the CSA umbrella, it is typical to also find Quality Assurance (QA) and Quality Control (QC). In some cases, service level management (SLM) is also included within this group. CSA information can address a number of business issues including the following:

- Individual user data collection and correlation for troubleshooting and VIP reporting
- Individualized Service Level Agreement reporting
- Noting customer preferences of certain network/content combinations.
- Real-time alarming concerning usage and problem analysis for specific services/group of users.
- Device configuration troubleshooting and reporting

There have been arguments against the effectiveness of CSA in the past due to some of the ways in which the service is implemented. For instance, customer call centers and surveys are often not accurate depending on the customer’s involvement. Additionally, the success of CSA is dependent on what is being measured or analyzed such as service vs. expectations.
