= Service Excellence Awards =

The Service Excellence Awards are any awards that seek to reward and recognize organizations and individuals who excel in serving clients whether in private organisations (Customer Services) or public organisations (Public Service).

The term first came to prominence after its adoption by the Customer Service Institute of Australia in 2001. The Australian Service Excellence Awards started 14 years ago and has grown to be the premier multi-industry and government awards in Australia. The Awards recognise and showcase the highest achievement in customer service excellence of professionals and organisations. Since then, various organisations and countries have emulated and adopted the term for use for their own customer service awards.

== Service Excellence Awards in Africa ==
In Africa, the following countries have adopted the Service Excellence awards

- Zimbabwe – 2012
- Kenya – 2014
- Zambia – 2015
- Malawi – 2015
- Namibia – 2015
- Botswana – 2015
