= Customer service =

Provision of service to customers

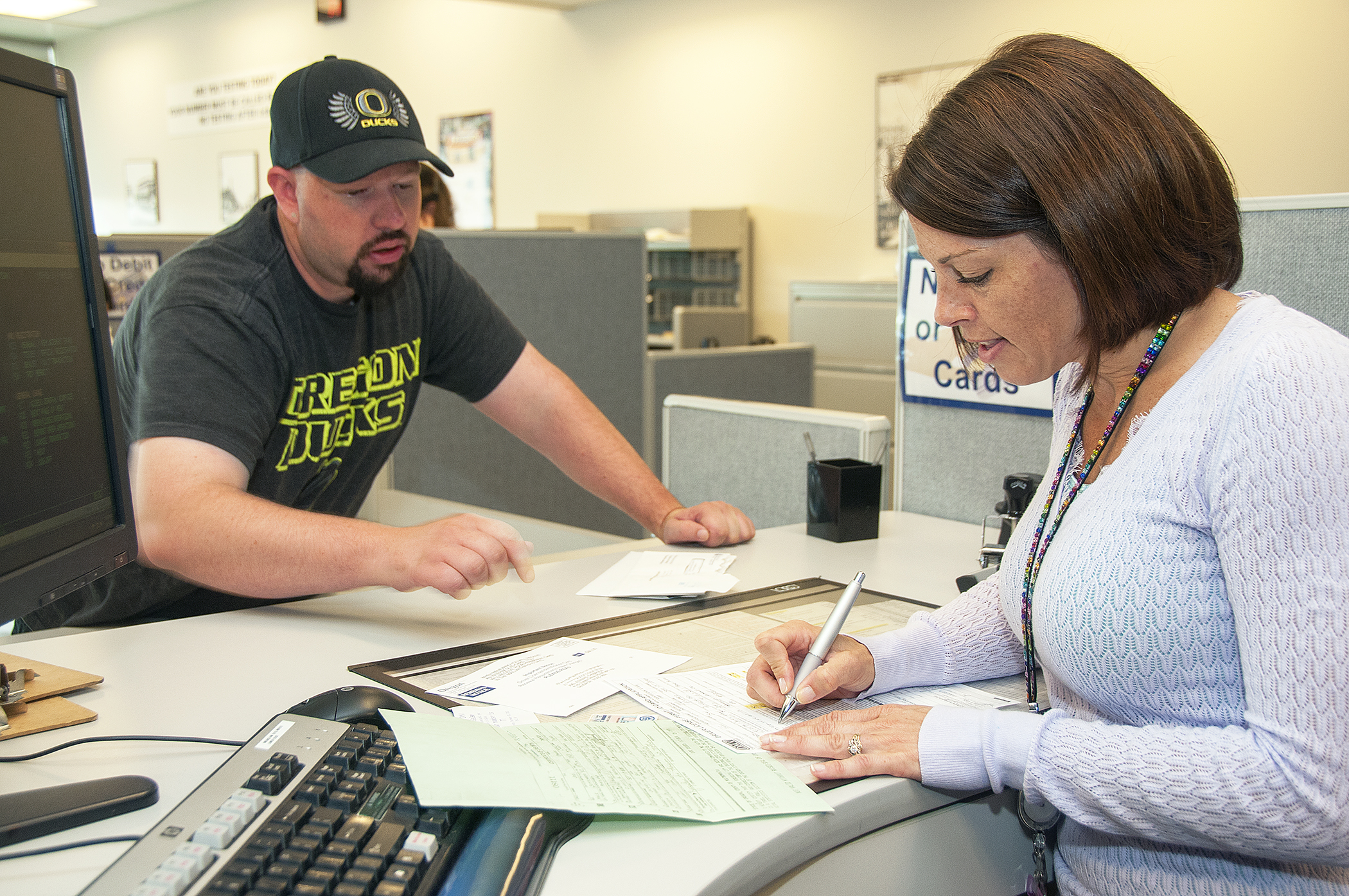
A DMV clerk helps a customer with paperwork.

Customer service is the assistance and advice provided by a company to those who buy or use its products or services, either in person or remotely. Customer service is often practiced in a way that reflects the strategies and values of a firm, and levels vary according to the industry. Good quality customer service is usually measured through customer retention. Successful customer service interactions are dependent on employees "who can adjust themselves to the personality of the customer".

Customer service in some cases is part of the firm's intangible assets and can differentiate it from others in the industry. One good customer service experience can change the entire perception a customer holds towards the organization. Generative AI and workflow automation are transforming customer contact operations by resolving high volumes of routine inquiries autonomously and serving as real-time copilots for human representatives. This transition accelerates ticket resolution times and reduces operational overhead, while shifting the composition of the frontline workforce: routine, transactional tier-1 support roles are increasingly curtailed or absorbed through attrition, concentrating human employment on high-complexity, emotionally nuanced, and escalated interactions.

The evolution in the service industry has identified the needs of consumers. Companies usually create policies or standards to guide their personnel to follow their particular service package. A service package is a combination of tangible and intangible characteristics a firm uses to take care of its clients.

== Customer support ==
Customer support is a range of consumer services to assist customers in making cost-effective and correct use of a product. It includes assistance in planning, installation, training, troubleshooting, maintenance, upgrading, and disposal of a product. These services may even be provided at the place in which the customer makes use of the product or service. In this case, it is called "at home customer service" or "at home customer support". Customer support is an effective strategy that ensures that the customer's needs have been attended to. Customer support helps ensure that the products and services that have been provided to the customer meet their expectations. When receiving an effective and efficient customer support experience, customers tend to be loyal to the organization, which creates a competitive advantage over its competitors. Organizations should ensure that any complaints from customers about customer support have been dealt with effectively.

== Automation and productivity increase ==
Customer service may be provided in person (e.g. sales / service representative), or by automated means, such as kiosks, websites, and apps. An advantage of automation is that it can provide service 24 hours a day which can complement face-to-face customer service. There is also economic benefit to the firm. Through the evolution of technology, automated services become less expensive over time. This helps provide services to more customers for a fraction of the cost of employees' wages. Automation can facilitate customer service or replace it entirely.

A popular type of automated customer service is done through artificial intelligence (AI). The customer benefit of AI is the feel for chatting with a live agent through improved speech technologies while giving customers the self-service benefit. AI can learn through interaction to give a personalized service. The exchange the Internet of Things (IoT) facilitates within devices, lets us transfer data when we need it, where we need it. Each gadget catches the information it needs while it maintains communication with other devices. This is also done through advances in hardware and software technology. Another form of automated customer service is touch-tone phone, which usually involves IVR (Interactive Voice Response) a main menu and the use of a keypad as options (e.g. "Press 1 for English, Press 2 for Spanish").

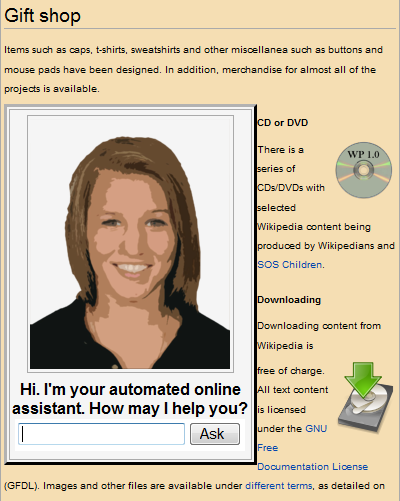
An automated online assistant with avatar providing automated customer service on a web page

Examples of customer service by artificial means are automated online assistants that can be seen as avatars on websites, which enterprises can use to reduce operating and training costs. These are driven by chatbots, and a major underlying technology to such systems is natural language processing.

== Metrics ==
The two primary methods of gathering feedback are customer surveys and Net Promoter Score measurement, used for calculating the loyalty that exists between a provider and a consumer.

== Instant feedback ==
Many outfits have implemented feedback loops that allow them to capture feedback at the point of experience. For example, National Express in the UK has invited passengers to send text messages while riding the bus. This has been shown to be useful, as it allows companies to improve their customer service before the customer defects, thus making it far more likely that the customer will return next time.

== See also ==
- Automated attendant
- Customer experience management
- Customer relationship management
- Customer satisfaction
- Customer Service Assurance
- Customer service representative
- Customer service training
- Demand chain
- Interactive voice response
- Live support software
- Privacy policy
- Professional services automation
- Public Services
- Sales
- Sales process engineering
- Sales territory
- Service climate
- Service system
- Social skills
- Support automation
- Technical support
- Help desk software
