= Mindanao Journal =

- Type: Weekly newspaper
- Format: Tabloid
- Publisher: Ferdinand M. Ledesma
- Editor: Jimmy K. Laking
- Founded: 1977
- Language: English, Cebuano
- Headquarters: Davao City, Philippines
- Circulation: general circulation
- Price: P 10.00
- Website: mindanaojournal.com.ph

The Mindanao Journal is published weekly since 1977 by the Mindanao Journal Publications with their editorial and advertising office located at the 2nd floor of the Methodist Mission Center Bldg., C.M. Recto St., Davao City, Philippines.
