= Jose P. Laurel =

President of the Philippines from 1943 to 1945

José P. Laurel
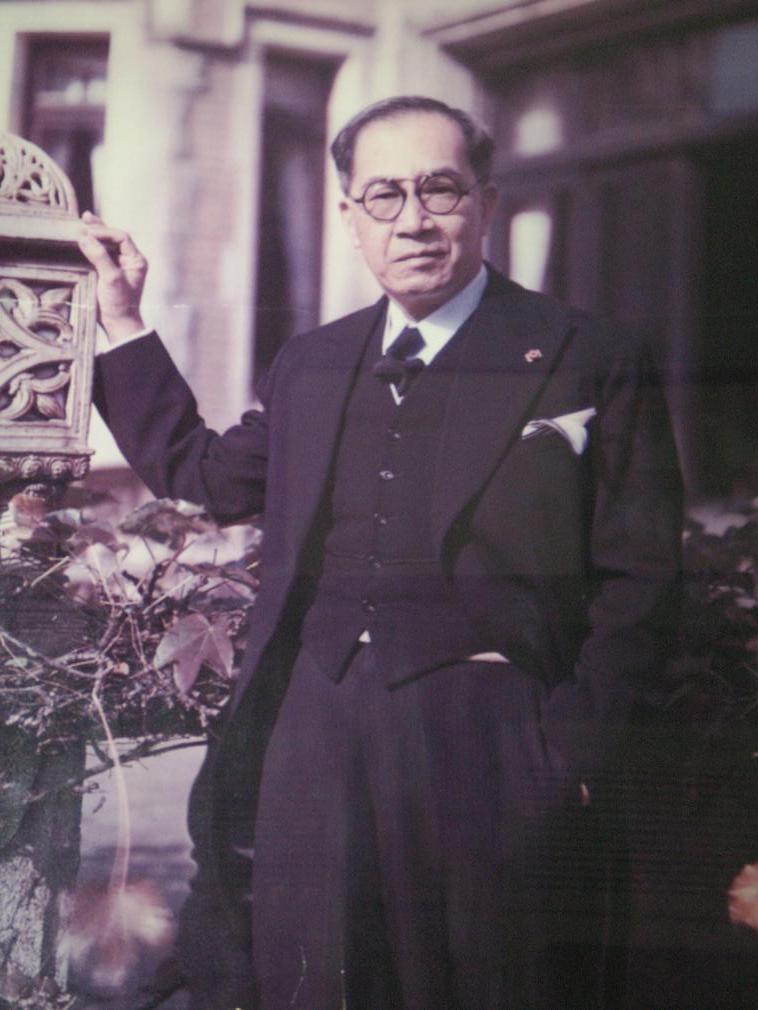
- Laurel in 1943

3rd President of the Philippines
- In office October 14, 1943 – August 17, 1945 Serving with Manuel L. Quezon (Note: Manuel L. Quezon continued to serve his new term as president of the government in exile until his death in 1944) (1943–1944) and Sergio Osmeña (Note: Sergio Osmeña succeeded Quezon as president of the government in exile in 1944) (1944–1945)
- Vice President: Ramon Avanceña (1943–1944; de facto); Benigno Aquino Sr. (1944–1945; de facto)
- Preceded by: Manuel L. Quezon (Note: As per the official chronological list of presidents by the contemporary Philippine government.)
- Succeeded by: Sergio Osmeña (Note: Osmeña became the sole president of the Philippines upon Laurel's dissolution of the Second Philippine Republic. The Commonwealth government became the sole governing entity of the Philippines.)
Other positions
Minister of the Interior
In office December 4, 1942 – October 14, 1943
Presiding Officer, PEC	Jorge B. Vargas
Preceded by	Benigno Aquino Sr.
Commissioner of Justice
In office December 24, 1941 – December 2, 1942
Presiding Officer, PEC	Jorge B. Vargas
Preceded by	Teófilo Sison
Succeeded by	Teófilo Sison
Senator of the Philippines
In office December 30, 1951 – December 30, 1957
Constituency	At-large
In office June 2, 1925 – June 2, 1931 Serving with Manuel L. Quezon
Preceded by	Antero Soriano
Succeeded by	Claro M. Recto
Constituency	5th district
34th Associate Justice of the Philippine Supreme Court
In office February 29, 1936 – February 5, 1942
Appointed by	Manuel L. Quezon
Preceded by	George Malcolm
Succeeded by	Court reorganized
Senate Majority Leader
In office June 2, 1925 – June 2, 1931
Senate President	Manuel L. Quezon
Preceded by	Francisco Enage
Succeeded by	Benigno Aquino Sr.
10th Secretary of the Interior
In office February 9, 1923 – July 17, 1923
Preceded by	Teodoro Kalaw
Succeeded by	Felipe Agoncillo
Undersecretary of the Department of the Interior
Ad interim
In office May 22, 1922 – February 9, 1923

Personal details
- Born: José Paciano Laurel y García; March 9, 1891 Tanauan, Batangas, Captaincy General of the Philippines, Spanish East Indies
- Died: November 6, 1959 (aged 68) Santa Mesa, Manila, Philippines
- Resting place: Tanauan City Public Cemetery, Tanauan, Batangas, Philippines
- Party: Nacionalista (1925–1942; 1945–1959)
- Other political affiliations: KALIBAPI (1942–1945)
- Spouse: Pacencia Hidalgo (m. 1911)
- Children: José B. Laurel Jr. José S. Laurel III; Natividad Laurel-Guinto; Sotero Laurel II; Mariano Laurel; Rosenda Laurel-Avanceña; Potenciana Laurel-Yupangco; Salvador Laurel; Arsenio Laurel
- Relatives: Laurel family
- Education: University of the Philippines Manila (LLB); University of Santo Tomas (LLM); Yale University (SJD); Colegio de San Juan de Letran (Associate in Arts)

Military service
- Allegiance: (Commonwealth of the Philippines) Philippine Commonwealth; Second Philippine Republic
- Years of service: 1943–1945
- Rank: Commander-in-Chief
- Battles/wars: World War II: Japanese occupation of the Philippines

José Paciano Laurel y García (March 9, 1891 – November 6, 1959) was a Filipino politician, lawyer, and judge, who served as the president of the Second Philippine Republic from 1943 to 1945, which was a Japanese puppet state during World War II.

Laurel was the runner-up in the 1949 Philippine presidential election. In the 1951 Philippine Senate election, he was elected to the Senate of the Philippines for the Nacionalista Party. He headed a mission to negotiate trade and other matters with the United States, which led to the Laurel–Langley Agreement of 1954.

Since the administration of President Diosdado Macapagal (1961–1965), Laurel has been recognized by later administrations as a former president of the Philippines.

== Early life and education ==
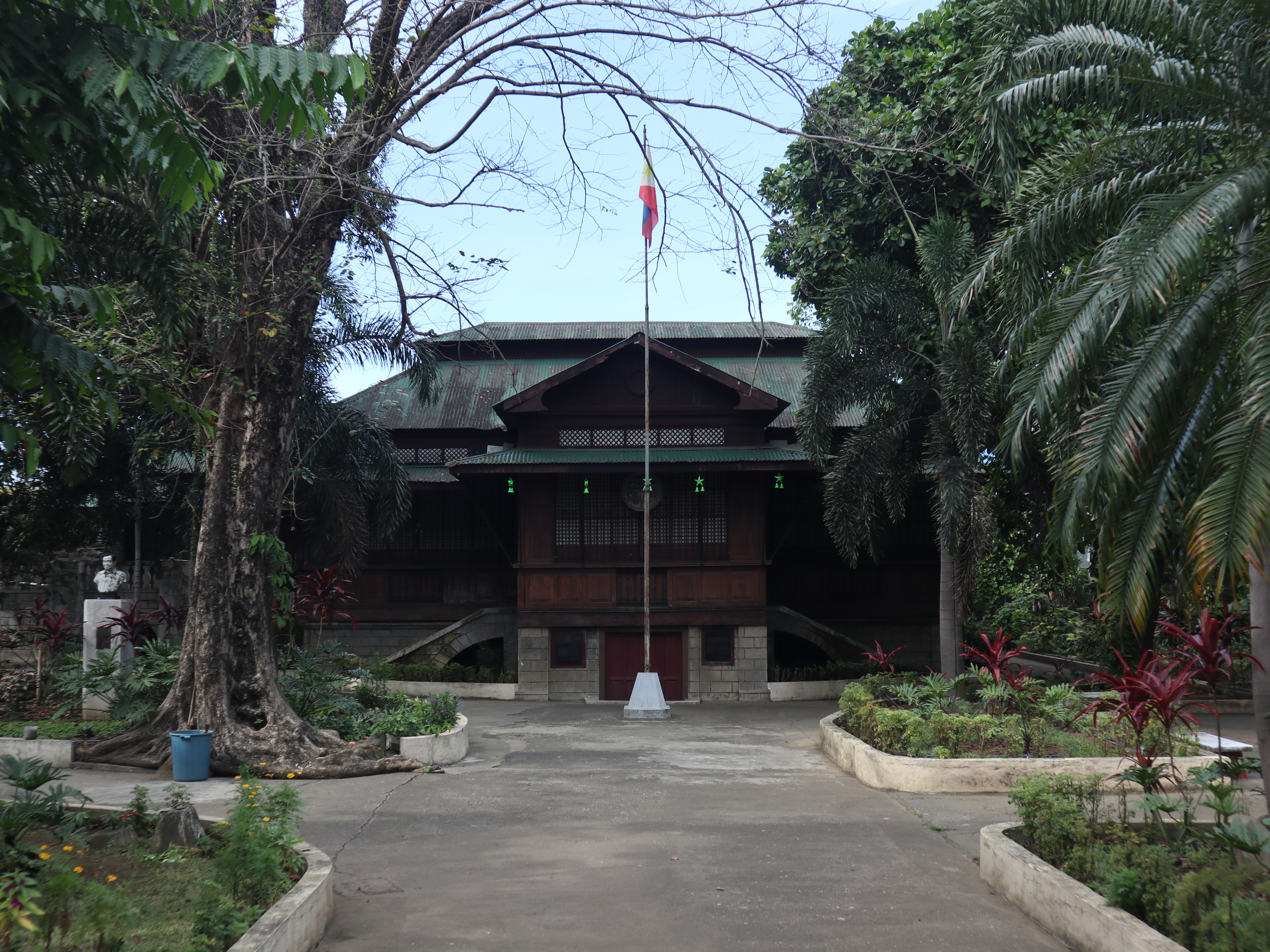
The Pres. Jose P. Laurel Memorial Shrine in Tanauan, Batangas, where Laurel was born

Jose Paciano Laurel y García was born on March 9, 1891, in the town of Tanauan, Batangas. His parents were Sotero Laurel y Remoquillo and Jacoba García y Pimentel, both from Tanauan. His father had been an official in the revolutionary government of Emilio Aguinaldo and a signatory to the 1899 Malolos Constitution. Like a number of other presidents, he was of Chinese mestizo descent. His second given name Paciano was in honor of Paciano Rizal.

Laurel studied at the San Jose College in Tanauan before transferring in 1903 to Colegio de San Juan de Letran in Manila. He later attended "La Regeneracion", where he completed the Spanish secondary course of instruction. In 1907, he finished the intermediate grades at Manila public schools.

Laurel completed his high school education at Manila High School in 1911. While still a teenager, Laurel was convicted of "frustrated murder" when he almost killed, with a fan knife, a rival suitor of the girl he stole a kiss from. While studying at law school, he appealed his conviction to the Supreme Court of the Philippines. The Supreme Court reversed his conviction in 1912.

Laurel in 1919

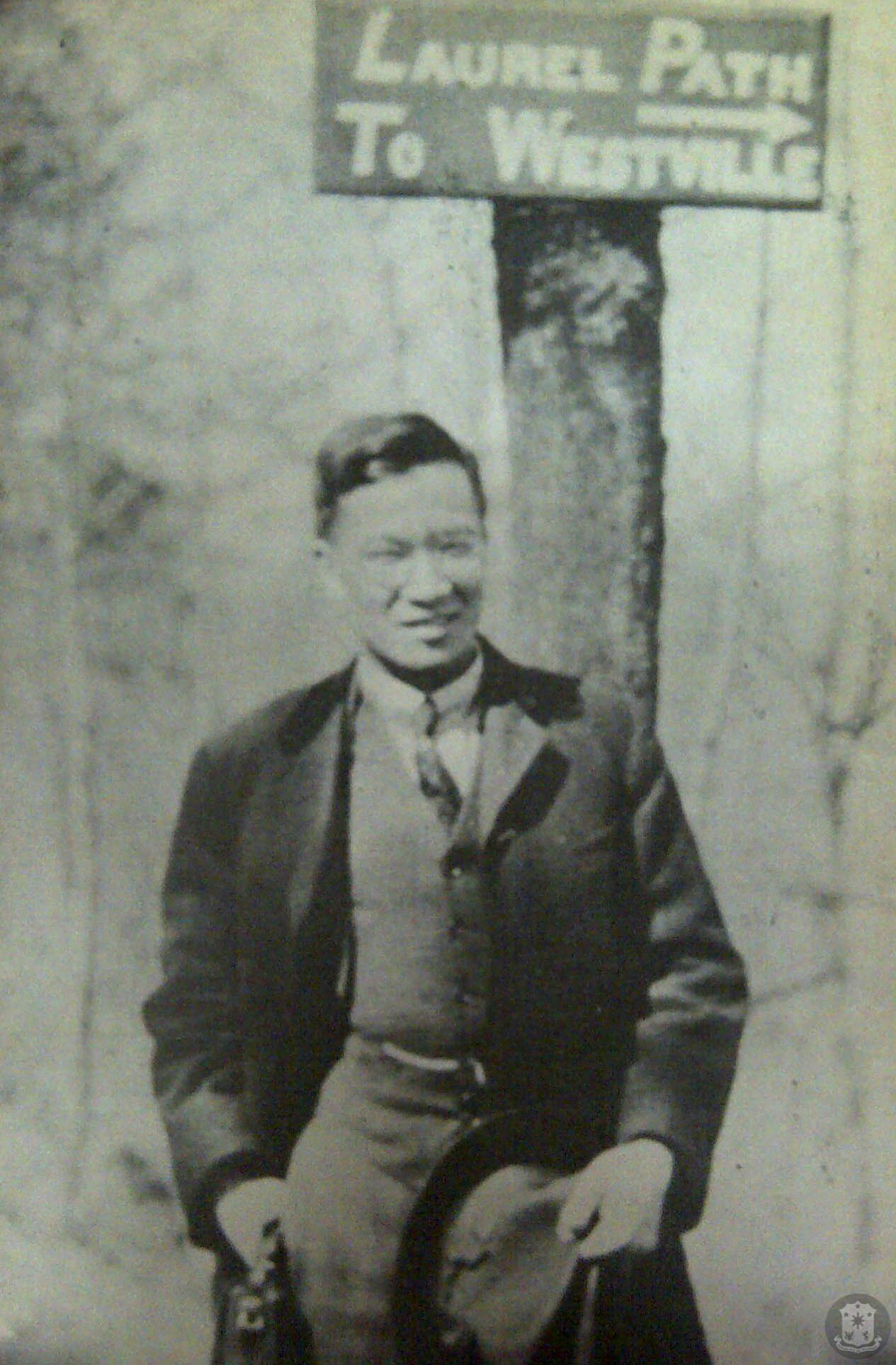
Laurel as a law student at Yale University

Laurel received his law degree from the University of the Philippines College of Law in 1915, where he studied under Dean George A. Malcolm, whom he would later succeed at the Supreme Court of the Philippines. In the same year, he took the Philippine bar examination and placed second. He then obtained a Master of Laws degree from the University of Santo Tomas in 1919. Laurel was later awarded a scholarship at Yale Law School, where he obtained his J.S.D. degree in 1920. In the same year, he was admitted to the Bar by the Supreme Court of the United States and the Superior Court and Court of Appeals of the District of Columbia. He later traveled extensively throughout the United States and Europe, where he also took special courses in international law at Oxford University in England and at the University of Paris in France before returning to the Philippines in 1921. He also earned his Doctorate in Jurisprudence at the School of Law in Manila and Humanities at the University of Santo Tomas, also in Manila.

== Early career ==
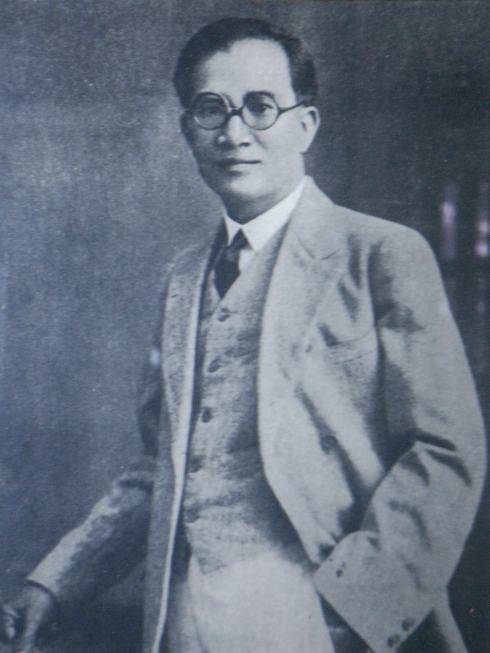
Laurel in 1922, when he was an attorney

Laurel began his life in public service while he was a student. He served as a messenger in the Bureau of Forestry, then as a clerk in the Code Committee tasked with the codification of Philippine laws, and as a law clerk in the Executive Bureau. During his work for the Code Committee, he was introduced to its head, Thomas A. Street, a future Supreme Court Justice who would be a mentor to the young Laurel.

In 1921, Laurel was also appointed as a lecturer at University of the Philippines, particularly at the College of Liberal Arts and at the College of Law.

Laurel was appointed first as ad interim Undersecretary of the Interior Department in 1922 (with two stints as acting secretary), then promoted as Secretary of the Interior in 1923. In that post, he would frequently clash with the American Governor-General Leonard Wood, and eventually, in 1923, resign from his position together with other Cabinet members in protest of Wood's administration. His clashes with Wood solidified Laurel's nationalist credentials.

Laurel was a member of the Philippine fraternity Upsilon Sigma Phi.

== Senator of the Philippines ==
In 1925, Laurel was elected to the Philippine Senate, beating incumbent Senator Antero Soriano. Serving from the fifth district, he would serve for one term before losing his re-election bid in 1931 to fellow Batangueño Claro M. Recto.

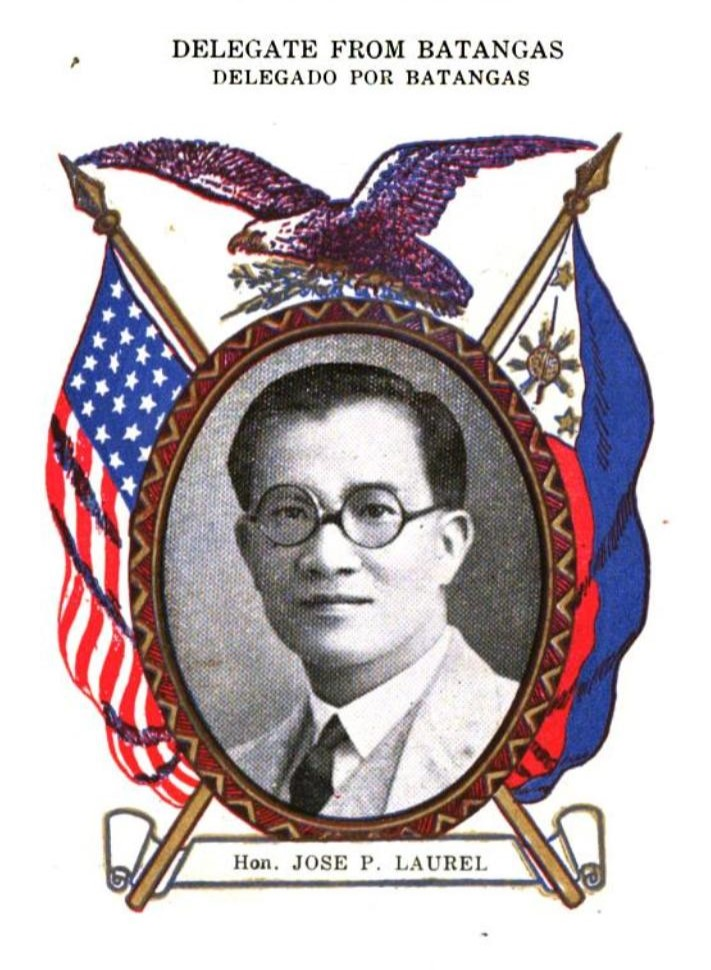
Laurel as a delegate to the Philippine Constitutional Convention, published by Benipayo Press (c. 1935)

He retired to private practice, but by 1934, he was again elected to public office, this time as a delegate to the 1935 Constitutional Convention. Hailed as one of the "Seven Wise Men of the Convention", he would sponsor the provisions of the Bill of Rights. Following the ratification of the 1935 Constitution and the establishment of the Commonwealth of the Philippines, Laurel was appointed Associate Justice of the Supreme Court on February 29, 1936.

== Associate Justice of the Supreme Court ==
Laurel's Supreme Court tenure may have been overshadowed by his presidency, yet he remains one of the most important Supreme Court justices in Philippine history. He authored several leading cases still analyzed to this day that defined the parameters of the branches of government as well as their powers.

Angara v. Electoral Commission, 63 Phil. 139 (1936), which is considered as the Philippine equivalent of Marbury v. Madison, 5 U.S. (1 Cranch) 137 (1803), is Laurel's most important contribution to jurisprudence and even the rule of law in the Philippines. In affirming that the Court had jurisdiction to review the rulings of the Electoral Commission organized under the National Assembly, the Court, through Justice Laurel's opinion, firmly entrenched the power of Philippine courts to engage in judicial review of the acts of the other branches of government, and to interpret the Constitution. Held the Court, through Laurel:

The Constitution is a definition of the powers of government. Who is to determine the nature, scope, and extent of such powers? The Constitution itself has provided for the instrumentality of the judiciary as the rational way. And when the judiciary mediates to allocate constitutional boundaries, it does not assert any superiority over the other departments; it does not in reality nullify or invalidate an act of the legislature, but only asserts the solemn and sacred obligation assigned to it by the Constitution to determine conflicting claims of authority under the Constitution and to establish for the parties in an actual controversy the rights which that instrument secures and guarantees to them.

Another highly influential decision penned by Laurel was Ang Tibay v. CIR, 69 Phil. 635 (1940). The Court acknowledged in that case that the substantive and procedural requirements before proceedings in administrative agencies, such as labor relations courts, were more flexible than those in judicial proceedings. At the same time, the Court still asserted that the right to due process of law must be observed and enumerated the "cardinal primary rights" that must be respected in administrative proceedings. Since then, these "cardinal primary rights" have stood as the standard in testing due process claims in administrative cases.

Calalang v. Williams, 70 Phil. 726 (1940) was a seemingly innocuous case involving a challenge raised by a private citizen to a traffic regulation banning kalesas from Manila streets during certain afternoon hours. The Court, through Laurel, upheld the regulation as within the police power of the government. But in rejecting the claim that the regulation was violative of social justice, Laurel would respond with what would become his most famous aphorism, which is to this day widely quoted by judges and memorized by Filipino law students:

Social justice is neither communism, nor despotism, nor atomism, nor anarchy, but the humanization of laws and the equalization of social and economic forces by the State so that justice in its rational and objectively secular conception may at least be approximated. Social justice means the promotion of the welfare of all the people, the adoption by the Government of measures calculated to insure economic stability of all the competent elements of society, through the maintenance of a proper economic and social equilibrium in the interrelations of the members of the community, constitutionally, through the adoption of measures legally justifiable, or extra-constitutionally, through the exercise of powers underlying the existence of all governments on the time-honored principle of salus populi est suprema lex. Social justice, therefore, must be founded on the recognition of the necessity of interdependence among divers and diverse units of a society and of the protection that should be equally and evenly extended to all groups as a combined force in our social and economic life, consistent with the fundamental and paramount objective of the state of promoting the health, comfort, and quiet of all persons, and of bringing about "the greatest good to the greatest number."

While an associate justice, Laurel also held other appointive posts. Laurel was appointed by President Manuel L. Quezon as a member of the Moral Code Committee in 1939 and as member of the Code Committee in 1940. In 1941, he was also appointed as Professor of Civil Law at the Central College of Law. He was also named as acting Secretary of Justice and acting Chief Justice in December of the same year and Commissioner of Justice in January 1942. His time as associate justice ended on February 5, 1942.

== Cabinet member and accession ==
The Japanese occupation of the Philippines was launched on December 8, 1941, soon after the Attack on Pearl Harbor. On December 10, Associate Justice Laurel was appointed by President Manuel L. Quezon as acting Secretary of Justice.

Lacking air cover, the United States Asiatic Fleet withdrew to Java on December 12. General Douglas MacArthur was ordered out, leaving his men at Corregidor on March 11, 1942, for Australia. Some 76,000 American and Filipino defenders in Bataan surrendered on April 9, 1942.

Laurel was among the Commonwealth officials instructed by the Japanese Imperial Army to form a provisional government when it took control of the country. He cooperated with the Japanese, in contrast to Chief Justice José Abad Santos, who was shot for refusing to cooperate. Laurel was well known to the Japanese as a critic of US rule and had demonstrated a willingness to serve under the Japanese Military Administration, and held a series of high posts in 1942–1943.

He was appointed Commissioner of Justice by the commander-in-chief of the Imperial Japanese Forces on January 26, 1942, but this was effective on January 23. On December 2, 1942, he was relieved of the post to become Minister of the Interior, a position he had previously held as Secretary two decades before. He relinquished the post on October 14, 1943, when he was inaugurated President of the Second Philippine Republic.

=== Assassination attempt ===
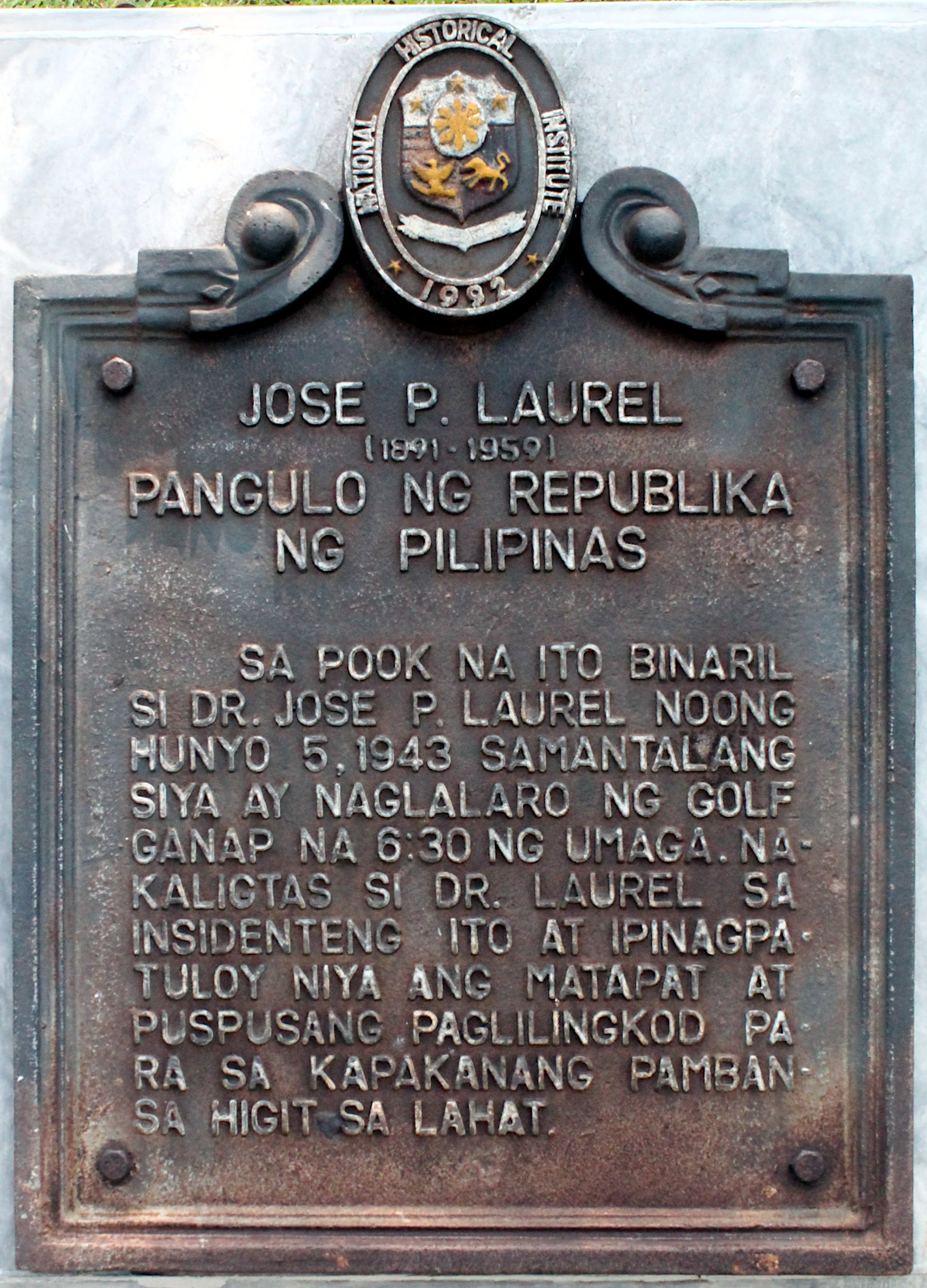
National historical marker installed in 1992 inside the Wack Wack Golf Club at the site where Laurel's assassination attempt occurred

On June 5, 1943, Laurel was playing golf at the Wack Wack Golf and Country Club, then in the City of Greater Manila, when he was shot around four times with a .45 caliber pistol. The bullets barely missed his heart and liver. He was rushed by his golfing companions, among them Far Eastern University president Nicanor Reyes Sr., to the Philippine General Hospital where he was operated on by the Chief Military Surgeon of the Japanese Military Administration and Filipino surgeons. Laurel recovered from his wounds.

Two suspects to the shooting were reportedly captured and swiftly executed by the Kempetai. Another suspect, a former boxer named Feliciano Lizardo, was presented for identification by the Japanese to Laurel at the latter's hospital bed, but Laurel then professed unclear memory.

However, in his 1953 memoirs, Laurel would admit that Lizardo, by then one of his bodyguards who had pledged to give his life for him, was indeed the would-be-assassin. Still, the historian Teodoro Agoncillo in his book on the Japanese occupation, identified a captain with a guerilla unit as the shooter.

== Presidency (1943–1945) ==
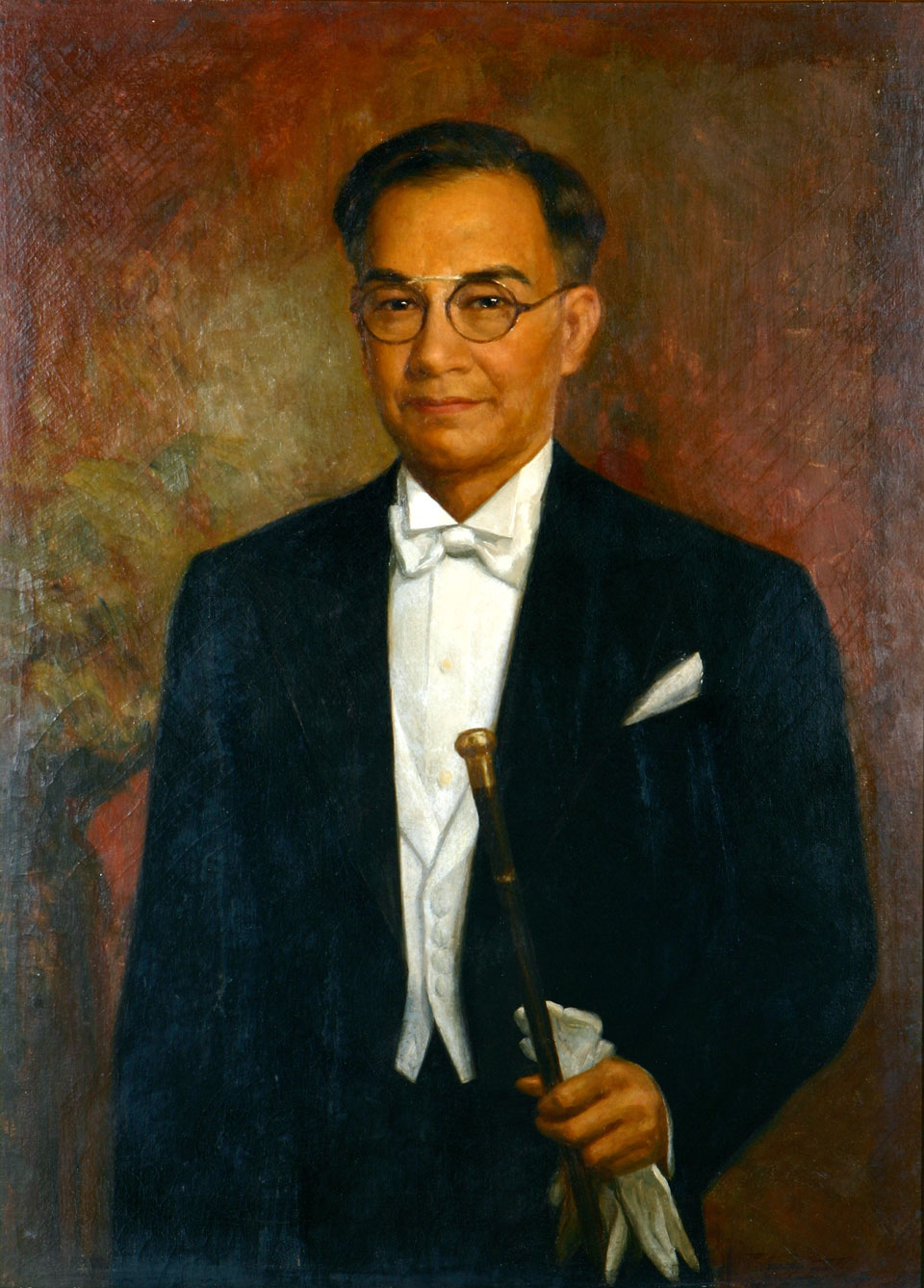
Official Malacañan Portrait by Fernando Amorsolo

Presidential styles of Jose P. Laurel
- Reference style: His Excellency
- Spoken style: Your Excellency
- Alternative style: Mr. President

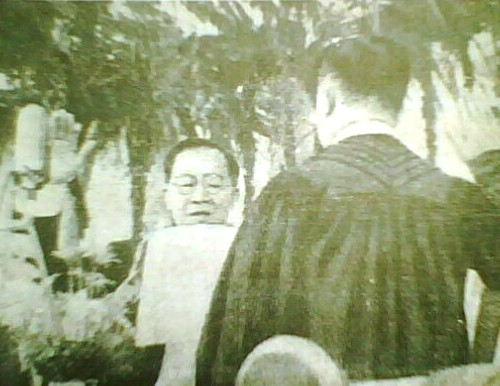
Former Supreme Court Justice Jose P. Laurel takes his oath of office as the 3rd president of the Philippines and 1st president of the Japanese-sponsored Second Philippine Republic.

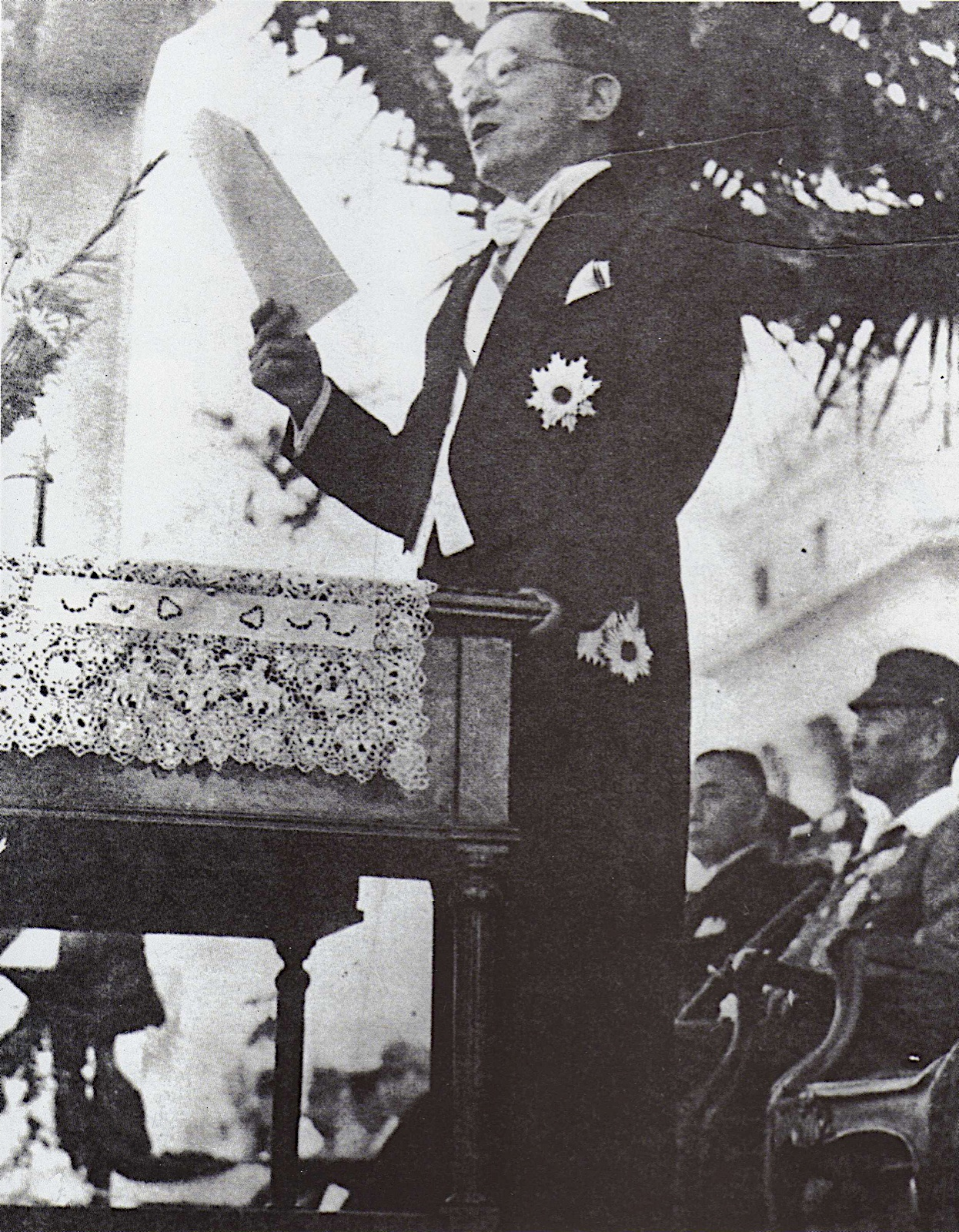
President Jose P. Laurel giving a speech after his inauguration as President of the Second Philippine Republic on October 14, 1943.

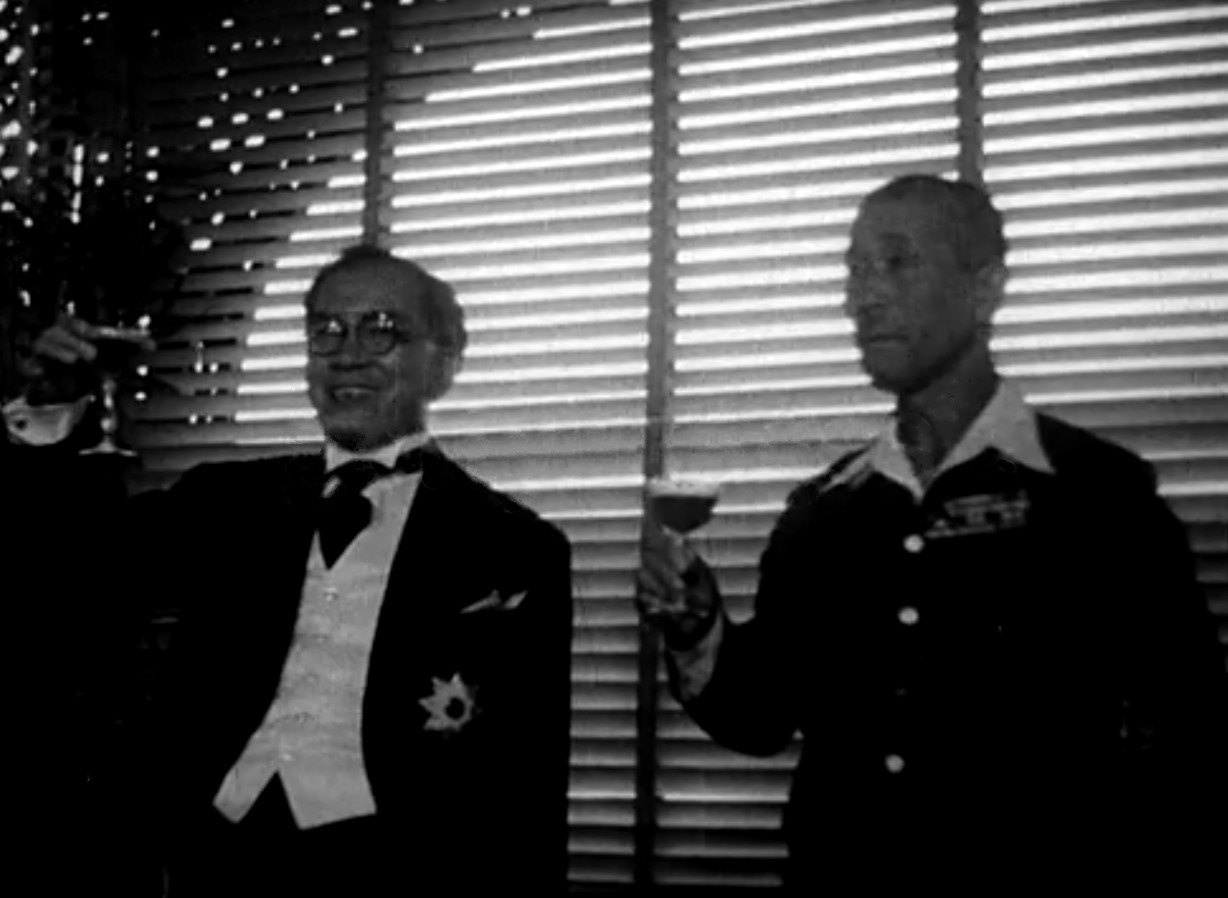
President Jose P. Laurel drinking with Shigenori Kuroda during the inaugural session of the Second Philippine Republic's National Assembly.

The presidency of Laurel understandably remains one of the most controversial in Philippine history. After the war, he would be denounced as a war collaborator and even a traitor, although his indictment for treason was superseded by President Roxas' Amnesty Proclamation.

=== Accession ===
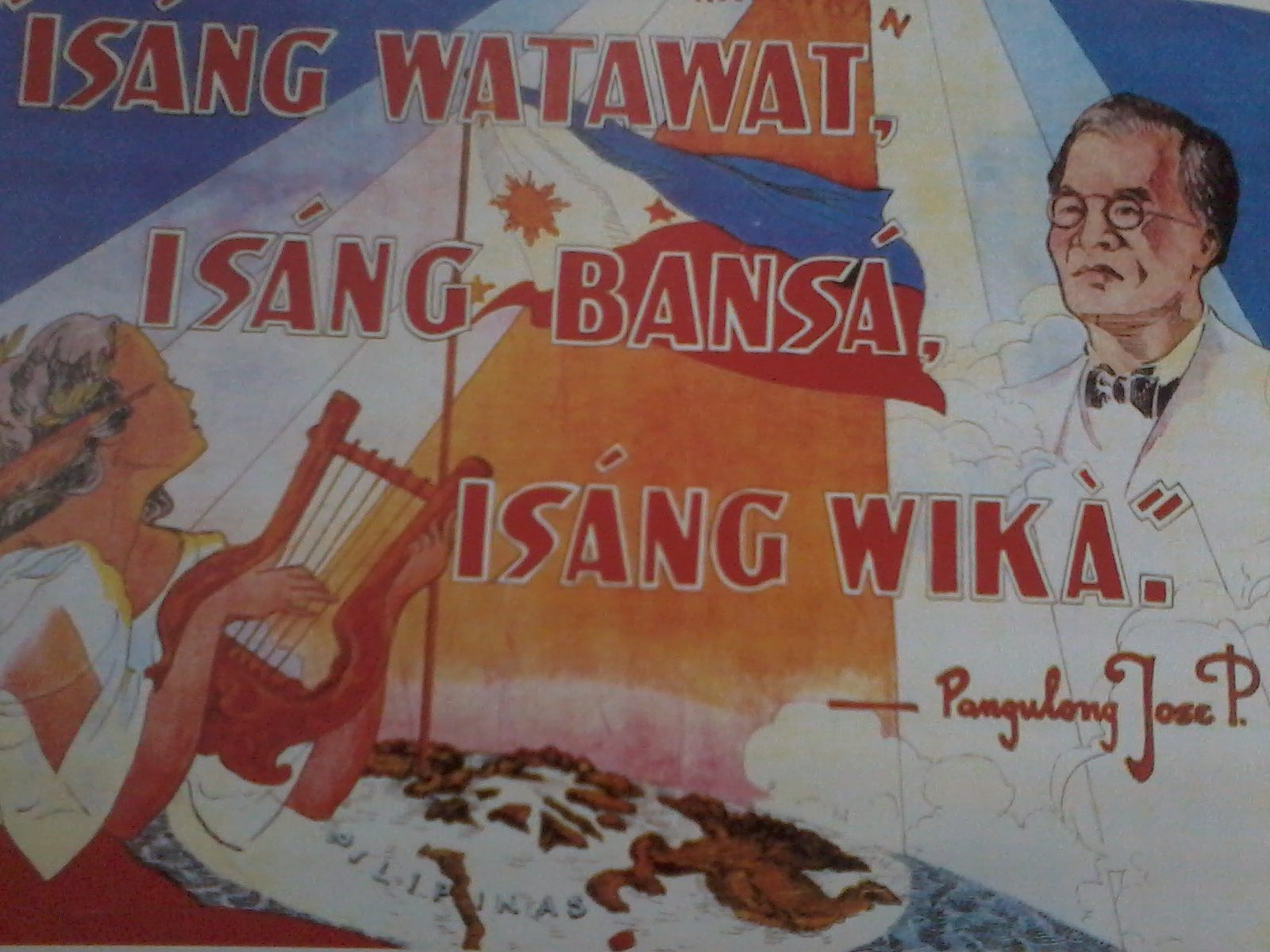
One of the propaganda slogans made during the Laurel administration. Tagalog for "One Banner, One Nation, One Language".

When Japan invaded, President Manuel L. Quezon first fled to Bataan and then to the United States to establish a government-in-exile. Quezon ordered Laurel, Vargas and other cabinet members to stay. Laurel's prewar, close relationship with Japanese officials (a son had been sent to study at the Imperial Japanese Army Academy in Tokyo, and Laurel had received an honorary doctorate from Tokyo Imperial University) in 1938, placed him in a good position to interact with the Japanese occupation forces.

Under vigorous Japanese influence, the National Assembly selected Laurel to serve as president in 1943. He took the oath of office on October 14, 1943, at the Legislative Building (now the National Museum of Fine Arts) in Manila. The oath was administered by Chief Justice José Yulo.

=== Domestic problems ===
==== Economy ====
During Laurel's tenure as president, hunger was the main worry. Prices of essential commodities rose to unprecedented heights. The government exerted every effort to increase production and bring consumers' goods under control. However, Japanese rapacity had the better of it all. On the other hand, guerrilla activities and Japanese retaliatory measures brought the peace and order situation to a difficult point. Resorting to district-zoning and domiciliary searches, coupled with arbitrary arrests, the Japanese made the mission of Laurel's administration incalculably exasperating and perilous.

==== Food shortage ====
During his presidency, the Philippines faced a crippling food shortage which demanded much of Laurel's attention. Rice and bread were still available but the sugar supply was gone.

=== Policy towards Japan ===
==== Philippine-Japanese Treaty of Alliance ====
On October 20, 1943, the Philippine-Japanese Treaty of Alliance was signed by Claro M. Recto, who was appointed by Laurel as his Foreign Minister, and Japanese Ambassador to Philippines Sozyo Murata. One redeeming feature was that no conscription was envisioned.

==== Greater East Asia Conference ====
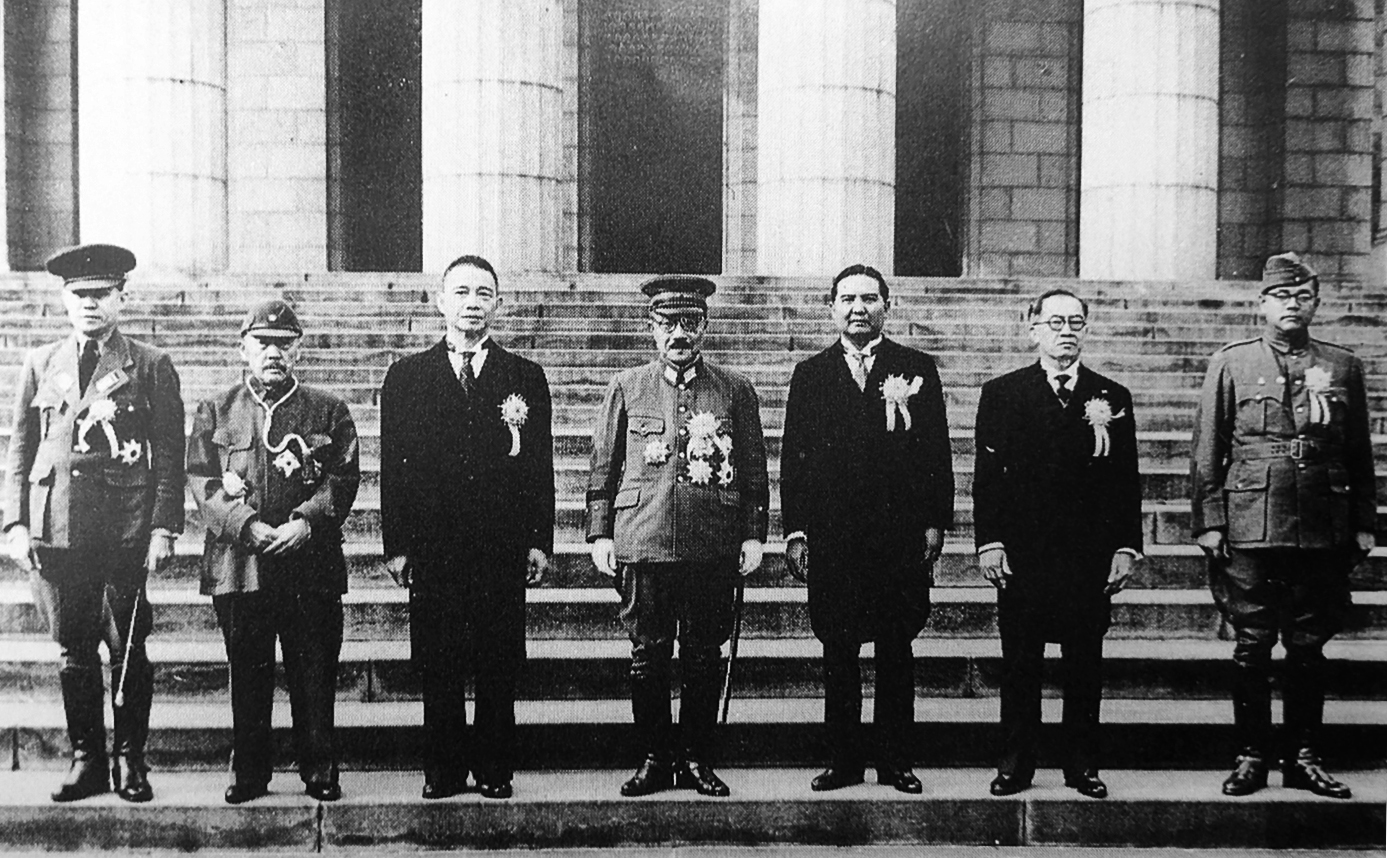
Greater East Asia Conference

Shortly after the inauguration of the Second Philippine Republic, President Laurel, together with cabinet Ministers Recto and Paredes flew to Tokyo to attend the Greater East Asia Conference which was an international summit held in Tokyo, Japan from November 5 to 6, 1943, in which Japan hosted the heads of state of various component members of the Greater East Asia Co-Prosperity Sphere. The conference was also referred to as the Tokyo Conference.

The Conference addressed few issues of any substance, Eradication of Western Opium Drug Trade and to illustrate the Empire of Japan's commitments to the Pan-Asianism ideal and to emphasize its role as the "liberator" of Asia from Western colonialism.

=== Martial law ===
Laurel declared the country under martial law in 1944 through Proclamation No. 29, dated September 21. Martial law came into effect on September 22, 1944, at 9 a.m. Proclamation No. 30 was issued the next day, declaring the existence of a state of war between the Philippines and the United States and the United Kingdom. This took effect on September 23, 1944, at 10 a.m.

=== Resistance ===
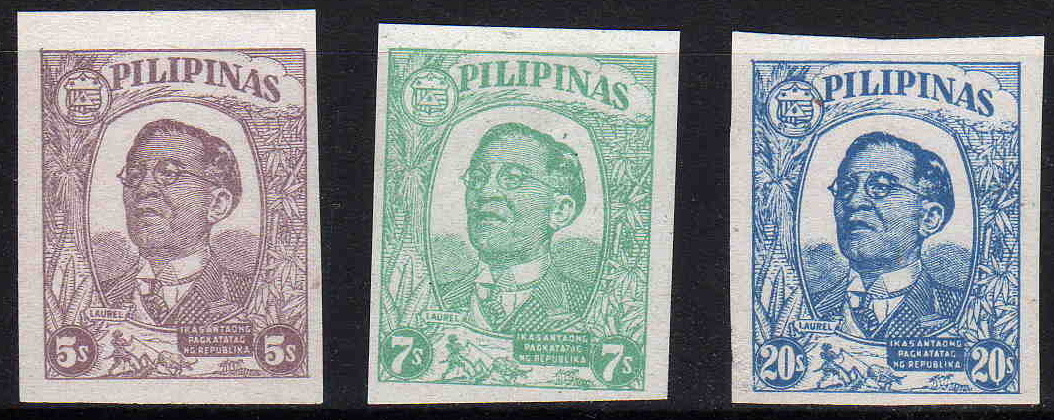
Postage stamps issued by the Japanese-controlled Second Philippine Republic in commemoration of its first anniversary. Depicted on the stamps is President Laurel.

Due to the nature of Laurel's government and its connection to Japan, much of the population actively resisted the Japanese occupation and his presidency, instead supporting the exiled Commonwealth government.

=== Dissolution of the regime ===
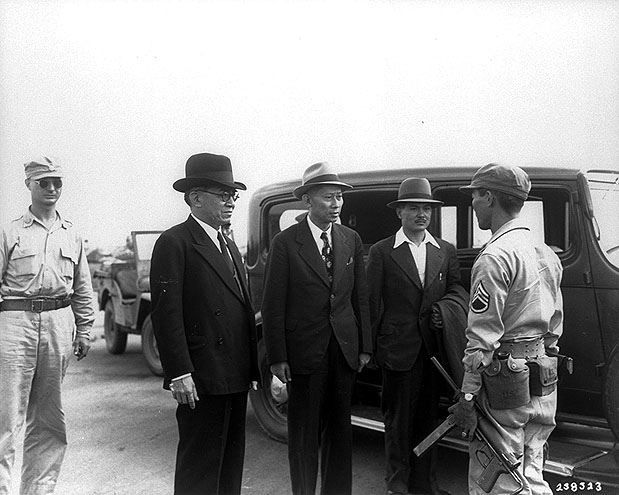
Laurel (left) being taken into U.S. custody at Osaka Airport in 1945, along with Benigno Aquino Sr. (center) and Jose Laurel III

On October 20, 1944, American and Philippine armed forces landed on Leyte Island during the Battle of Leyte and began the Liberation of the Philippines. Philippine President in exile Sergio Osmeña was among them. Other landings on other islands followed. Then on January 9, 1945, Allied forces landed on the south shore of Lingayen Gulf and began to march towards Manila.

During the Battle of Manila from February 3 to March 3, 1945, Japanese occupation forces were driven from the capital city. After that, only pockets of Japanese forces remained active in the Philippines.

Beginning in March 1945, President Laurel, together with his family, Camilo Osías, Benigno Aquino Sr., Gen. Mateo M. Capinpin, and Jorge B. Vargas evacuated to Baguio. Shortly after the city fell, they traveled to Tuguegarao, where they embarked a bomber plane to Japan via Formosa (now Taiwan) and Shanghai, China.

Emperor Hirohito of Japan announced Japan's unconditional surrender to the Allied Powers on August 15, 1945.

Two days later on August 17, 1945, from Nara Hotel in Nara, Japan, Laurel issued an executive proclamation which declared the dissolution of his regime.

== Post-presidency (1945–1959) ==
=== Collaboration trial and imprisonment ===
On September 2, 1945, the Japanese forces formally surrendered to the United States. Gen. Douglas MacArthur ordered Laurel arrested for collaborating with the Japanese. Alongside his son Jose Laurel III and Benigno Aquino Sr., he was taken to custody and was imprisoned in Yokohama on September 15, 1945. On November 16, 1945, they were transferred to Sugamo Prison. While in prison, he was not allowed to have any reading material except The World in 2030, a book by the Earl of Birkenhead that he had received as a gift from his son Salvador Laurel. Lacking in writing instruments, he used this book to write his Memoirs.

On July 23, 1946, Laurel, together with Osias, Aquino, and his son Jose III, left Tokyo for Manila, having been turned over to the Republic of the Philippines. One month later, he was placed under technical custody at his Peñafrancia house in Paco, Manila but rather than accepting the given conditions, he preferred to be imprisoned at the New Bilibid Prison in Muntinlupa, Rizal. He was later provisionally released in September 1946 after posting a ₱50,000 bail. He was also charged with 132 counts of treason in 1946 and was tried by the People's Court. However, the trial ended prematurely due to the general amnesty granted by President Manuel Roxas in 1948.

=== 1949 presidential election ===
Laurel ran for president as Nacionalista's presidential nominee against incumbent Liberal Elpidio Quirino in the 1949 Philippine presidential election but lost in what future Foreign Affairs Secretary Carlos P. Romulo and Marvin M. Gray considered as the dirtiest election in Philippine electoral history.

=== Return to the Senate ===
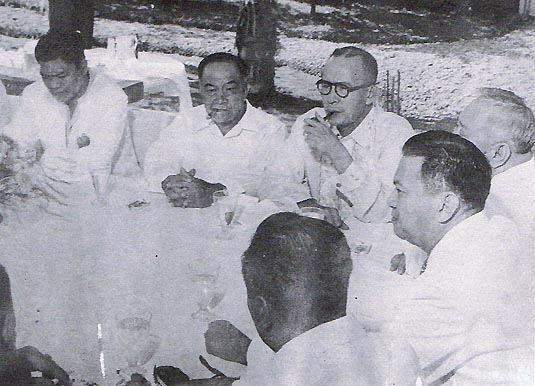
Clockwise, from top left: Senator Edmundo B. Cea, former President Jose P. Laurel Sr., Senator Cipriano Primicias Sr., Senate President Eulogio A. Rodriguez Sr., President Ramon Magsaysay, & House Speaker Jose B. Laurel Jr. in Malacañan Palace, 1955

Laurel garnered more than 2 million votes and was elected to the Senate of the Philippines as the top vote-getter in the 1951 Philippine Senate election, under the Nacionalista Party. He was urged to run for president in 1953, but declined, working instead for the successful election of Ramon Magsaysay. Magsaysay appointed Laurel head of a mission tasked with negotiating trade and other issues with United States officials, the result being known as the Laurel–Langley Agreement. Laurel was also named as chairman of the Senate Committee on Education, which he held when he sponsored in 1955 a bill that would make José Rizal's two novels, Noli Me Tángere and El filibusterismo, as compulsory readings in all universities and colleges.

=== Retirement and death ===
Laurel considered his election to the Senate as a vindication of his reputation. He declined to run for re-election in 1957. He retired from public life, concentrating on the development of the Lyceum of the Philippines established by his family, as well as the Philippine Banking Corporation, which he had established.

During his retirement, Laurel resided in a 1957 three-story, seven-bedroom mansion in Mandaluyong, Rizal, dubbed "Villa Pacencia" after Laurel's wife. The home was one of three residences constructed by the Laurel family, the other two being in Tanauan, Batangas and in Paco, Manila (called "Villa Peñafrancia"). In 2008, the Laurel family sold "Villa Pacencia" to then-Senate President Manny Villar and his wife Cynthia.

In 1958, Laurel launched an organization known as Committee of Citizens, which he headed. On the same year, it was announced that his book entitled Thinking of Ourselves would be launched and The Manila Times announced the launching of Unity Movement for National Survival that he sponsored. On his 68th birthday on March 9, 1959, President Carlos P. Garcia conferred him the award of Philippine Legion of Honor with the degree of Chief Commander.

In the early afternoon of November 5, 1959, Laurel suffered a stroke. On November 6, 1959, at 1 in the morning, he died at Our Lady of Lourdes Hospital in Manila, from a massive heart attack and cerebral hemorrhage. President Carlos P. Garcia declared a "period of national mourning" from November 6 to the day of Laurel's interment over Laurel's death. His wake was held at Villa Pacencia in Mandaluyong before being interred on November 8, 1959, at what is now Tanauan City Public Cemetery in Tanauan, Batangas.

== Honors ==
National Honor

- : Philippine Legion of Honor, Chief Commander - (1959)
- : Knights of Rizal, Knight Grand Cross

Namesake Structures

- Jose P. Laurel Highway
- Jose Laurel Street

Foreign Honor

- : Order of the Rising Sun, 1st Class, Grand Cordon

== Personal life ==
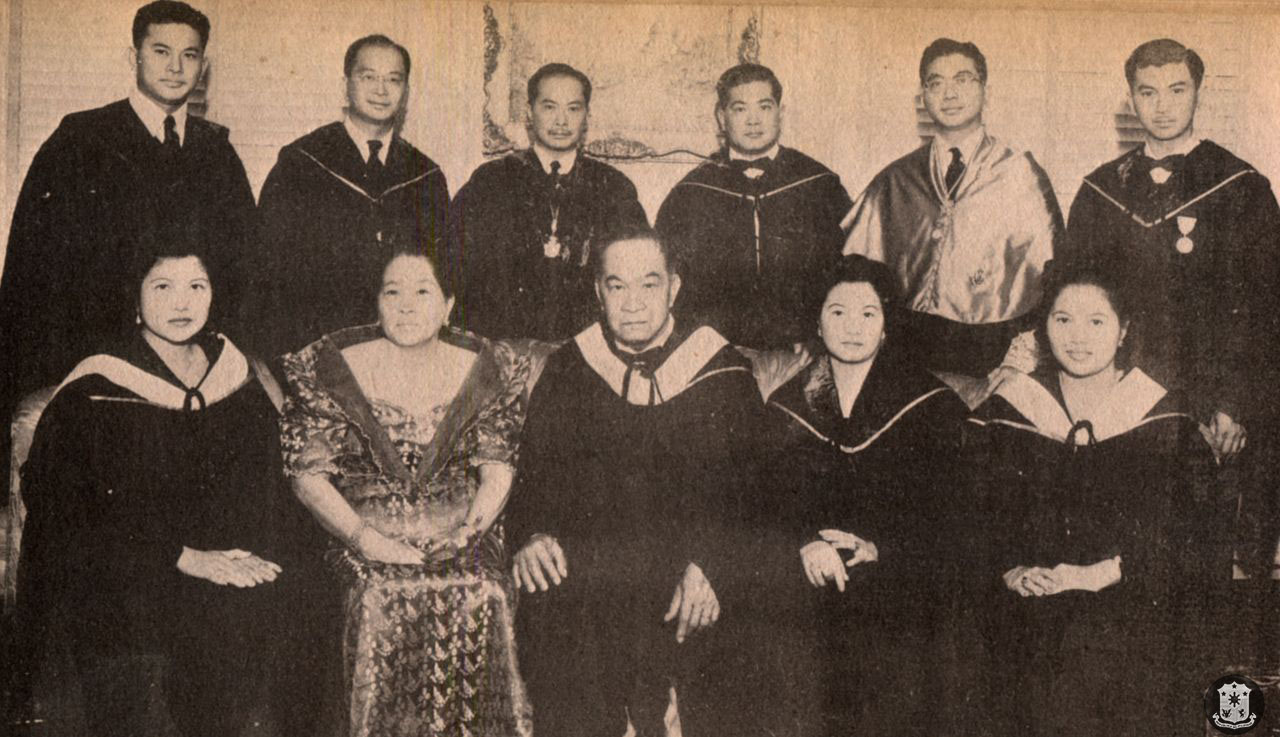
Pres. Laurel and his family

He married Pacencia Hidalgo on April 9, 1911. The couple had nine children:

- Jose Bayani Laurel Jr. (August 27, 1912 – March 11, 1998), member of the Philippine National Assembly from Batangas from 1943 to 1944, Congressman from Batangas's third district from 1941 to 1957 and from 1961 to 1972, Speaker of the House of Representatives of the Philippines from 1954 to 1957 and from 1967 to 1971, Assemblyman of Regular Batasang Pambansa from 1984 to 1986, Member of the Philippine Constitutional Commission of 1986 in 1986, and a vice presidential candidate of the Nacionalista Party in Philippine presidential election of 1957
- Jose Sotero Laurel III (August 27, 1914 – January 6, 2003), ambassador to Japan
- Natividad Laurel-Guinto (born December 25, 1916, deceased)
- Sotero Cosme Laurel II (September 27, 1918 – September 16, 2009), Senator of the Philippines from 1987 to 1992 became Senate President pro tempore from 1990 to 1992
- Mariano Antonio Laurel (January 17, 1922 – August 2, 1979)
- Rosenda Pacencia Laurel-Avanceña (born January 9, 1925, deceased)
- Potenciana Laurel-Yupangco (born May 19, 1926, deceased)
- Salvador Roman Laurel (November 18, 1928 – January 27, 2004), Senator of the Philippines from 1967 to 1972, Prime Minister of the Philippines in 1986, Secretary of Foreign Affairs of the Philippines from 1986 to 1987, Vice President of the Philippines from 1986 to 1992 and a presidential candidate of the Nacionalista Party in Philippine presidential election of 1992
- Arsenio Laurel (December 14, 1931 – November 19, 1967), first two-time winner of the Macau Grand Prix in 1962 and 1963

=== Descendants ===
- Roberto Laurel, grandson, President of Lyceum of the Philippines University-Manila and Lyceum of the Philippines University-Cavite, son of Sotero Laurel (3rd son of Jose P. Laurel)
- Peter Laurel, grandson, President of Lyceum of the Philippines University-Batangas and Lyceum of the Philippines University-Laguna, former vice-governor of Batangas
- Denise Laurel, great-granddaughter, actress and singer
- Nicole Laurel Asensio, great-granddaughter, lead singer of General Luna band

== See also ==
- Laurel incident

== Notes ==
Offices and distinctions
Senate of the Philippines
Preceded by Antero Soriano	Senator from the 5th senatorial district 1925–1931	Succeeded by Claro M. Recto
Preceded by Francisco Enage	Majority leader of the Senate of the Philippines; 1928–1931	Succeeded by Benigno S. Aquino
Legal offices
Preceded by George A. Malcolm	Associate Justice of the Supreme Court; 1936–1941	Court reorganised
Political offices
Preceded by Teodoro Kalaw	Secretary of the Interior of the Philippines; 1922–1923	Succeeded by Felipe Agoncillo
Preceded by Teófilo Sison as Secretary of Justice	Commissioner of Justice; 1941–1942	Succeeded by Teófilo Sison
Preceded by Manuel L. Quezon as president of the Philippines	President of the Republic of the Philippines; 1943–1945	Succeeded by Sergio Osmeña as president of the Philippines
Preceded by Jorge B. Vargas (de facto) as Presiding Officer of the Philippine Executive Commission	President of the Republic of the Philippines; 1943–1945	Succeeded by Sergio Osmeña as president of the Philippines
Party political offices
Preceded by Sergio Osmeña	Nacionalista Party nominee for President of the Philippines; 1949	Succeeded by Ramon Magsaysay
