= Vicente Ilustre =

Filipino lawyer, diplomat and politician

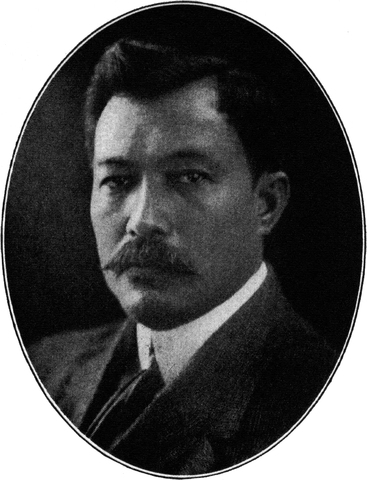
- Official portrait, c. 1917

Senator of the Philippines from the 5th District
- In office 16 October 1916 – 3 June 1919 Serving with Manuel Quezon
- Preceded by: position established
- Succeeded by: Antero Soriano

Personal details
- Born: 6 September 1869 Taal, Batangas, Captaincy General of the Philippines
- Died: 27 September 1928 (aged 59) Manila, Philippine Islands
- Party: Independent

Vicente Ilustre y Encarnación (6 September 1869 – 27 September 1928) was a Filipino lawyer, diplomat and politician.

While serving as president of the Committee for Mindanao and Sulu, Ilustre authored the Philippine Commission Act No. 2408, which affected the colonization of Mindanao during the American occupation.

== Early life and education ==
Ilustre was born in Taal, Batangas on 6 September 1869. He earned his bachelor's degree from the Ateneo Municipal de Manila. He then pursued his higher education in Spain, where received his doctorate in law from the Universidad Central de Madrid and became associated with members of the Propaganda Movement such as Jose Rizal, Marcelo H. del Pilar and Mariano Ponce.

== Career ==
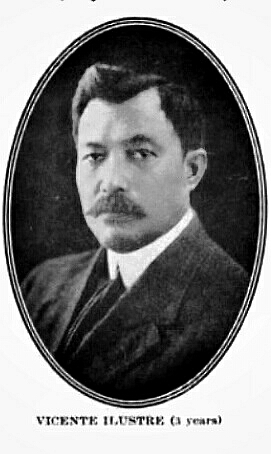
Ilustre depicted in a publication of the Philippine Education, published April 1917

During the Philippine-American War, he served as a representative of the Philippine revolutionary government to the United States, albeit based in Hong Kong. Ilustre also served as president of the examining board of candidates for the practice of Law in 1909. In 1910, he subsequently became president of the Philippine Bar Association. During the American occupation, he was appointed by Governor-General Francis Burton Harrison to the Philippine Commission, serving as president of the Committee for Mindanao and Sulu from 1913 to 1916. Upon the establishment of the Philippine Senate in 1916 he was elected as a Senator from the 5th District, comprising Batangas, Cavite, Mindoro and Tayabas, and served until 1919. He served on the Committee on Rules, the Committee on Relations with the Sovereign Government, and the Committee on Justice.

== Colonization of Mindanao ==
Philippine Commission Act No. 2408, authored by Ilustre, is an early example of Filipino legislation aimed at the colonization of Mindanao. The act, titled "An Act Providing a Temporary Form of Government for the Territory known as the Department of Mindanao and Sulu," was passed on July 23, 1914. According to Stevens (2011), the Preamble indicates that Filipinos reacted to American threats by developing laws modeled after American practices to unify the archipelago. He further added that the act reflects the idea that Christian Filipinos would improve the Muslims and non-Christians of Mindanao and Sulu, which mirrors the American colonial mission in the early 1900s.

In a 1915 interview with Ilustre regarding the formation of the Department of Mindanao and Sulu, he raised the issue that most of the appointed governors for the province and districts from the former Philippine Commission were all army officers, subjecting Muslims to an iron hand governance. The Muslim regions of the archipelago were organized by Philippine Commission Act No. 787 from 1903 until 1914. Ilustre’s Act recognized the role of tribal leaders, called datus, who operated under a district governor and received a government stipend. Datus handled justice for Muslims and Pagans, while cases involving Christians were managed by a higher court.

== Personal life and death ==
Ilustre was married to Rita Marella Villavicencio and died on 27 September 1928.
