= Philippines's 5th senatorial district =

- Former constituency for the Senate of the Philippines
- Provinces / Cities: Batangas, Cavite, Marinduque, Mindoro, Tayabas
- Population: 1,048,422 (1935)
- Electorate: 203,936 (1935)

Former constituency
- Created: 1916
- Abolished: 1934

Philippines's 5th senatorial district, officially the Fifth Senatorial District of the Philippine Islands (Spanish: Quinto Distrito Senatorial de las Islas Filipinas), was one of the twelve senatorial districts of the Philippines in existence between 1916 and 1935. It elected two members to the Senate of the Philippines, the upper chamber of the bicameral Philippine Legislature under the Insular Government of the Philippine Islands for each of the 4th to 10th legislatures. The district was created under the 1916 Jones Law from the southern Luzon provinces of Batangas, Cavite, Mindoro and Tayabas (present-day Quezon and Aurora). Marinduque was added in 1920 upon its re-establishment as a regular province separate from Tayabas.

The district was represented by a total of five senators throughout its existence. It was abolished in 1935 when a unicameral National Assembly was installed under a new constitution following the passage of the Tydings–McDuffie Act which established the Commonwealth of the Philippines. Since the 1941 elections when the Senate was restored after a constitutional plebiscite, all twenty-four members of the upper house have been elected countrywide at-large. It was last represented by Manuel Quezon and Claro Recto of the Nacionalista Democrático.

== List of senators ==
Seat A							Legislature	Seat B						
#	Image	Senator	Term of office		Party	Electoral history	Legislature	#	Image	Senator	Term of office		Party	Electoral history
#	Image	Senator	Start	End	Party	Electoral history	Legislature	#	Image	Senator	Start	End	Party	Electoral history
1		Manuel L. Quezon	October 16, 1916	September 16, 1935	Nacionalista	Elected in 1916.	4th	1		Vicente Ilustre	October 16, 1916	June 3, 1919	Independent	Elected in 1916.
1		Manuel L. Quezon	October 16, 1916	September 16, 1935	Nacionalista	Elected in 1916.	5th	2		Antero Soriano	June 3, 1919	June 2, 1925	Nacionalista	Elected in 1919.
1		Manuel L. Quezon	October 16, 1916	September 16, 1935	Nacionalista; Colectivista	Re-elected in 1922.	6th	2		Antero Soriano	June 3, 1919	June 2, 1925	Nacionalista; Colectivista	Elected in 1919.
1		Manuel L. Quezon	October 16, 1916	September 16, 1935	Nacionalista; Consolidado	Re-elected in 1922.	7th	3		José P. Laurel	June 2, 1925	June 2, 1931	Nacionalista; Consolidado	Elected in 1925.
1		Manuel L. Quezon	October 16, 1916	September 16, 1935	Nacionalista; Consolidado	Re-elected in 1928.	8th	3		José P. Laurel	June 2, 1925	June 2, 1931	Nacionalista; Consolidado	Elected in 1925.
1		Manuel L. Quezon	October 16, 1916	September 16, 1935	Nacionalista; Consolidado	Re-elected in 1928.	9th	4		Claro M. Recto	June 2, 1931	September 16, 1935	Demócrata	Elected in 1931.
1		Manuel L. Quezon	October 16, 1916	September 16, 1935	Nacionalista; Democrático	Re-elected in 1934.	10th	4		Claro M. Recto	June 2, 1931	September 16, 1935	Nacionalista; Democrático	Elected in 1931.

== See also ==
- Senatorial districts of the Philippines
