= Claro M. Recto =

Filipino politician (1890–1960)

The Honorable Claro M. Recto
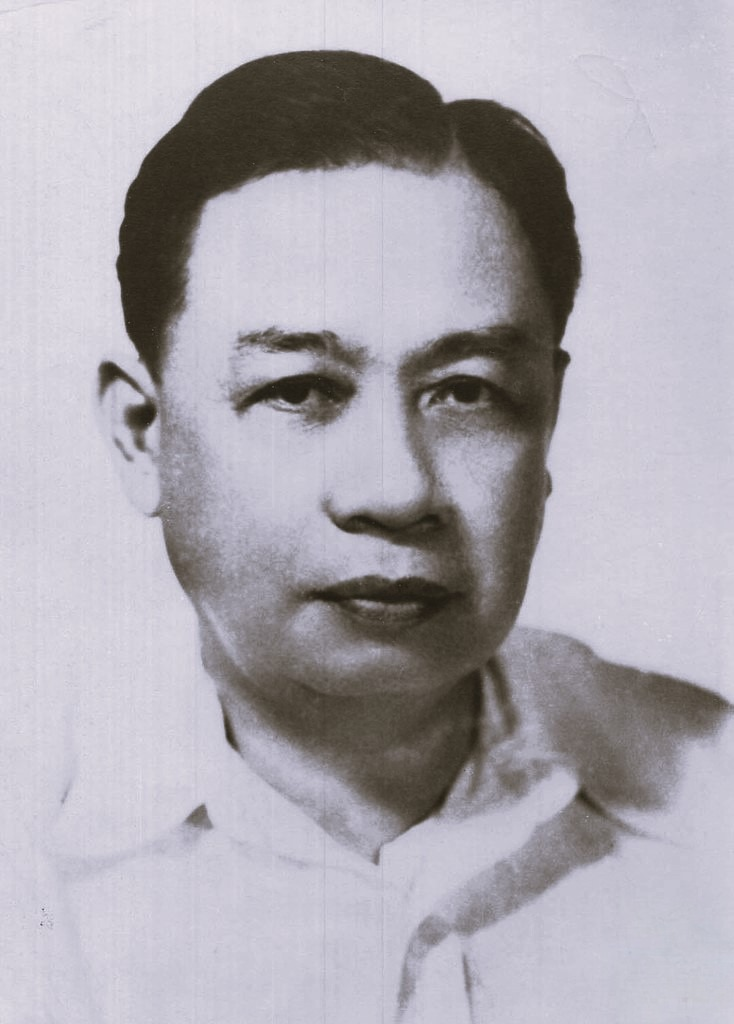

Associate Justice of the Supreme Court of the Philippines
- In office July 3, 1935 – November 1, 1936
- Appointed by: Franklin D. Roosevelt
- Preceded by: New seat
- Succeeded by: Manuel Moran

Senate Majority Leader
- In office July 16, 1934 – November 15, 1935
- Preceded by: Benigno Aquino Sr.
- Succeeded by: Position abolished (Next held by Melecio Arranz)

Senate Minority Leader
- In office July 16, 1931 – June 5, 1934
- Preceded by: Position established
- Succeeded by: Vacant (Note: The position of Minority Leader was left vacant as the Nacionalista Party controlled all the seats in the 10th Legislature.) (Next held by Carlos P. Garcia)

Senator of the Philippines
- In office April 3, 1952 (Note: Recto officially started his term on April 3, 1952 after winning an electoral protest against Teodoro de Vera who served from December 30, 1949) – October 2, 1960
- In office July 9, 1945 (Note: Though elections were held in 1941, the Senate would not convene until 1945 due to the Japanese occupation of the Philippines in World War II.) – May 25, 1946
- In office June 2, 1931 – November 15, 1935
- Preceded by: Jose P. Laurel
- Succeeded by: Senate abolished (Note: The bicameral Philippine Legislature was abolished in favor of the unicameral National Assembly of the Philippines, following the adoption of the 1935 Constitution and the establishment of the Commonwealth. Bicameralism would be reestablished in 1940, when a constitutional amendment replaced the Assembly with the Congress of the Philippines.)
- Constituency: 5th Senatorial District

Minister of Foreign Affairs
- In office October 19, 1943 – August 17, 1945
- President: Jose P. Laurel
- Preceded by: Position established (Note: The Ministry of Foreign Affairs was re-established during the Second Republic) (Previously held by Felipe Buencamino as Secretary of Foreign Relations)
- Succeeded by: Elpidio Quirino

Commissioner of Education, Health and Public Welfare (Philippine Executive Commission)
- In office January 26, 1942 – October 14, 1943
- Governors-General: Masaharu Homma; Shizuichi Tanaka; Shigenori Kuroda
- Preceded by: Position established (Note: Sergio Osmeña concurrently served as Secretary under the Commonwealth government)
- Succeeded by: Gabriel Mañalac (acting)

Member of the House of Representatives from Batangas' 3rd district
- In office June 3, 1919 – June 5, 1928
- Preceded by: Benito Reyes Catigbac
- Succeeded by: José Dimayuga

President of the 1934 Constitutional Convention
- In office July 30, 1934 – February 8, 1936

Personal details
- Born: Claro Recto y Mayo; February 8, 1890 Tiaong, Tayabas, Captaincy General of the Philippines (now Tiaong, Quezon, Philippines)
- Died: October 2, 1960 (aged 70) Rome, Italy
- Party: Nacionalista (1934–1942; 1949–1957)
- Other political affiliations: NCP (1957–1960); KALIBAPI (1942–1945); Democrata (1917–1934)
- Spouse(s): Angeles Silos; Aurora Reyes
- Relations: Ralph Recto (grandson); Alfonso M. Recto (brother)
- Children: 7 (including Rafael)
- Education: Ateneo de Manila (BA); University of Santo Tomas (LL.M)

Claro Mayo Recto Jr. (February 8, 1890 – October 2, 1960) was a Filipino lawyer, jurist, writer, author, columnist, diplomat, and statesman who served as a senator of the Philippines from 1931 until his death in 1960. Recto was the primary author of the 1935 Philippine Constitution, one of the foremost figures in the Philippine Independence from the United States, and is remembered as the "Great Dissenter" and the "Great Academician", as a fierce opponent of U.S. neocolonialism in Asia in his later years, and a staunch Filipino nationalist throughout his career.

Recto began his political career as the representative for the 3rd District of Batangas in 1919 and held the position until 1928, emerging as a prominent member of the Democrata Party. He was elected as a senator to the 10th Philippine Legislature, where he opposed the Hare-Hawes-Cutting Act, and later became president of the 1934 Philippine Constitutional Convention that drafted the 1935 Constitution. Recto and future president Manuel L. Quezon personally presented the constitution to U.S. President Franklin D. Roosevelt, who also appointed Recto as an Associate Justice of the Supreme Court of the Philippines—the last to be appointed by the United States.

At the height of World War II, Recto was detained by the United States for suspected collaboration with the Japanese, but was nonetheless reelected in 1941, garnering the highest number of votes among the elected senators. He joined the KALIBAPI during the Japanese occupation of the Philippines and served in President Jose P. Laurel's wartime cabinet. Recto was faced with treason and collaboration charges at the end of the war, but refused the amnesty issued by President Manuel Roxas and chose to defend himself in court instead. He was acquitted of all charges.

He was reelected to the Senate in 1949 and 1955, where he was an outspoken critic of continued American influence in Asia—as well as Presidents Elpidio Quirino and Ramon Magsaysay—for which he was targeted by the United States Central Intelligence Agency. Following Carlos P. Garcia's assumption to the presidency in 1957, Recto and Senator Lorenzo Tañada defected from Nacionalista and established the Nationalist Citizens' Party (NCP). The pair ran under the NCP in the hotly-contested 1957 presidential election, but ultimately lost, ending up fourth in the national vote.

In 1960, Recto was appointed the Ambassador Extraordinary and Minister Plenipotentiary of the Philippines' cultural envoy. He died under mysterious circumstances (reported as a heart attack) on October 2, 1960, in Rome, on a diplomatic mission en route to Spain. Historians believe that the CIA may have had a hand in his death.

He is the father of former Batasang Pambansa assemblyman Rafael Recto and grandfather of Secretary of Finance Ralph Recto.

== Early life and education ==
Claro Mayo Recto was born in Tiaong, Tayabas (now part of Quezon province), Philippines, to educated, upper-middle-class parents—Claro Recto Sr. of Rosario, Batangas, and Micaela Mayo of Lipa, Batangas. He began studying Latin at the Instituto de Rizal in Lipa from 1900 to 1901. He continued his education at Colegio del Sagrado Corazón of Don Sebastián Virrey and completed his secondary schooling in 1905 at the age of 15.

He then moved to Manila to attend the Ateneo de Manila, where he consistently earned outstanding scholastic marks, graduating maxima cum laude with a Bachelor of Arts degree in 1909. He went on to obtain a Master of Laws degree from the University of Santo Tomás, and in 1969, he was conferred a Doctor of Laws degree honoris causa by Central Philippine University.

== House of Representatives (1916–1928) ==
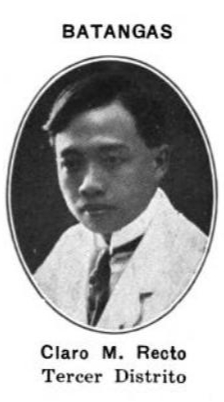
Recto as member of the House of Representatives, c. 1923

Recto launched his political career in 1916 as a legal adviser to the first Philippine Senate. In 1919, he was elected representative from the second district of Batangas.

Recto joined Juan Sumulong's opposition party, the Partido Democrata National (Democrata Party), and was its candidate for Speaker of the House in the 1922 elections. The party won 25 seats, though Recto was defeated by the Nacionalista-Colectivista candidate Manuel Roxas, and instead became House Minority Floor Leader until 1925.

=== 1924 Philippine Independence Mission ===
On July 17, 1923, all Filipino members of Governor-General of the Philippines Leonard Wood's Council of State resigned en masse in the 1923 Philippine Cabinet Crisis, following prolonged tensions over Wood's perceived autocratic actions. Recto and the Democrata Party sided with Wood on the matter, for which then-Senate President Manuel L. Quezon labeled them as "traitorous" during the special senatorial election of 1923.

Meanwhile, when news of the crisis reached Washington in early 1924, support for Philippine autonomy surged in the 68th United States Congress, and a flood of congressional resolutions and bills ranging from immediate Philippine independence to complete autonomy with an option for freedom were introduced.

By March, a bill by Indiana Representative Louis W. Fairfield gained the most popularity. It proposed a commonwealth with an elected Filipino leader, a 25-year transition period, continued U.S. military bases, and American control over foreign relations, debt, and defense until full independence. Support for the bill proved overwhelming, though the rapid pace alarmed the Coolidge administration. Wood was urged to publicly oppose Congress's hasty push for independence, to no avail.

Likewise, Quezon and senator Sergio Osmeña felt that—although Congress had meant well—the bill's terms were unsatisfactory and it was being advanced too quickly. They launched the 1924 Philippine Independence mission to the United States in an attempt to delay the Fairfield bill.

To ensure bipartisan support, Quezon invited Recto to join the mission, along with Osmeña and Resident Commissioners of the Philippines Isauro Gabaldon and Pedro Guevara. They arrived in early May, and after a private meeting between Quezon and US Secretary of War John W. Weeks, the Fairfield bill was successfully delayed. In the same year, Recto was admitted to the American Bar.

However, Recto—despite not being present at the meeting—somehow acquired key documents of the exchange, and in November 1924, revealed that Quezon had accepted terms falling short of full independence. In doing this, Recto attempted to position the Democrats as defenders of immediate independence and take revenge for Quezon's insult in 1923.

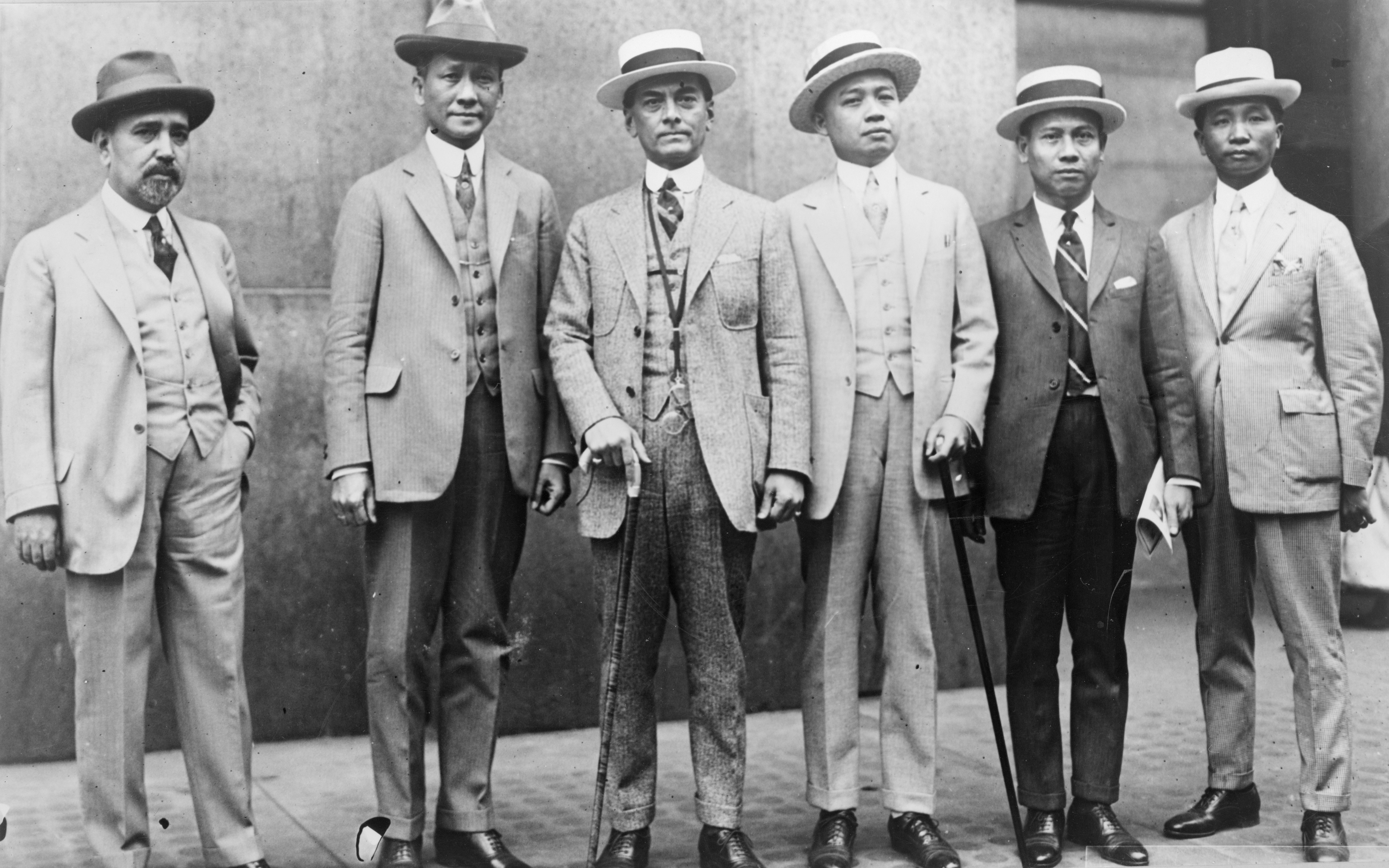
(From left) Isauro Gabaldon, Sergio Osmeña, Manuel L. Quezon, Claro M. Recto, Pedro Guevara, and Dean Jorge Bocobo; the representatives from the Philippine Independence Mission in May 1924.

His plot backfired, however, as Quezon and Osmeña were able to rally the legislature to their version of events. They insisted that they had rejected the Fairfield bill outright and would accept only full independence or continued "slavery" under American rule. Recto would again be defeated by Roxas (now under the reunited Nacionalista Party) in another bid for the House Speaker title in the 1925 elections.

=== Hiatus and return to politics ===
After his congressional term ended in 1928, Recto temporarily retired from politics and dedicated himself to the teaching and practice of law, joining the Guevara, Francisco, & Recto law firm. He would describe the world of academia to be "restrictive and soporific" and reentered politics in 1931.

== Senator of the Philippines (1931–1960) ==
=== First term (1931–1935) ===
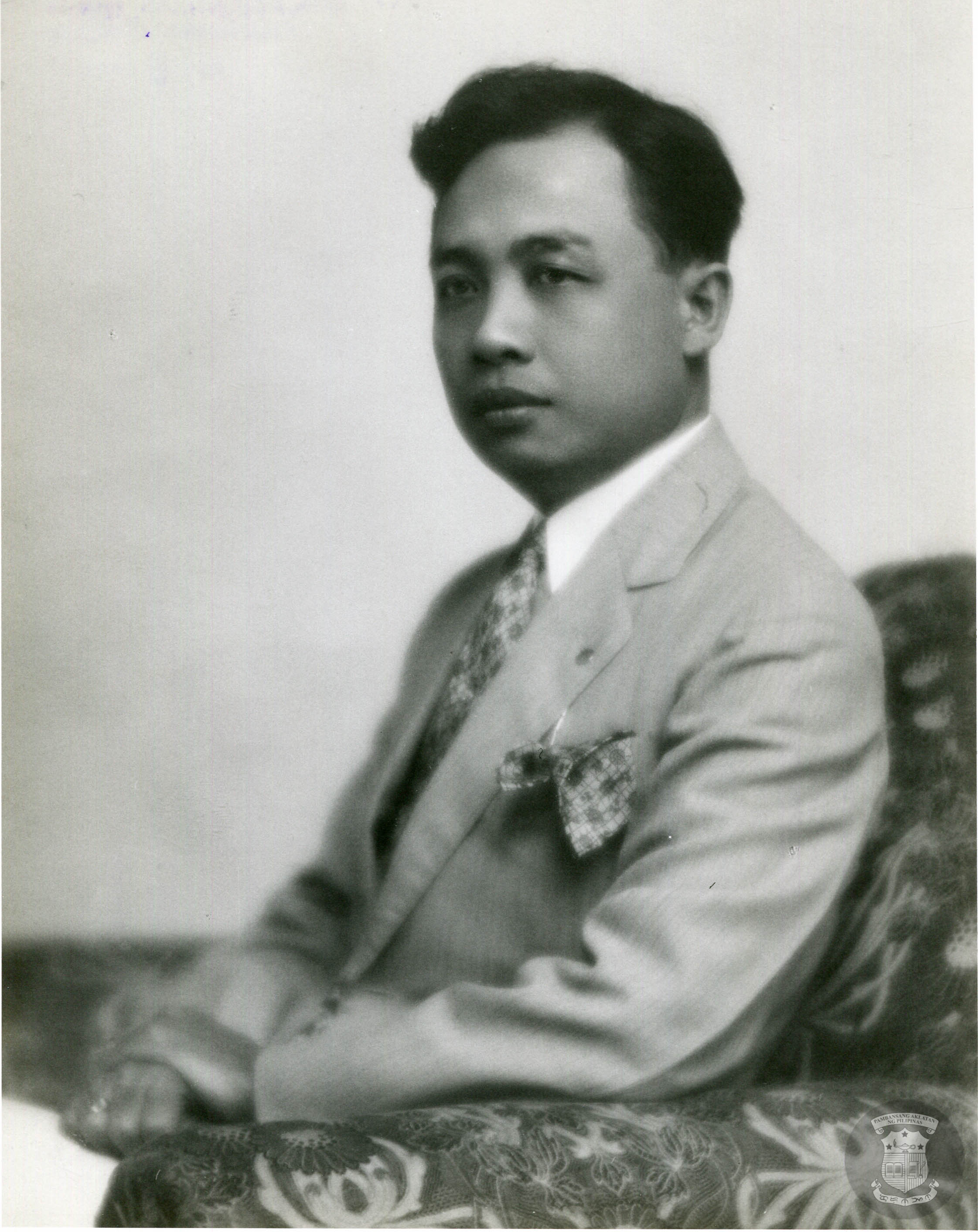
A portrait of Claro M. Recto

He was elected senator from the Fifth Senatorial District in the 1931 Senate elections but simultaneously lost his bid for Senate President against the incumbent Quezon. Recto would serve as the Senate Minority Floor Leader until 1934, becoming known as the "one-man fiscalizer" during this period. Recto switched to the Nacionalista Party in the 1934 senate elections and was elected Senate Majority Floor Leader.

==== Philippine independence (1934–1941) ====
The 1931 OsRox mission culminated in the Hare–Hawes–Cutting Act (1933), which sought to establish the Philippine Commonwealth as a transition government for 12 years and promised the country full independence on July 4, 1946. However, the act would also have required the Philippines to exempt American goods from customs duties and essentially allowed the indefinite retention of U.S. military and naval bases in the Philippines, as well as the American imposition of high tariffs and quotas on Philippine exports such as sugar and coconut oil.

Opposition sparked in response to the controversial provisions, with the ruling Nacionalista Party dividing into two factions pending the act's ratification: Recto joined Quezon's faction (dubbed the "Antis") who opposed the act, against Osmeña's faction (the "Pros"), who supported it. In the end, the Philippine Legislature rejected the Hare–Hawes–Cutting Act.

Quezon spearheaded another Philippine Independence mission to the US in 1934, securing the passage of the Tydings–McDuffie Act. The act formally established the Commonwealth as the transitional government of the Philippines, and specified a framework for the drafting of a Philippine constitution along with several mandatory constitutional provisions, including the approval of both the United States president and the Filipino people. Before independence, the act also allowed the U.S. to maintain military forces in the Philippines and to call all military forces of the Philippine government into U.S. military service. Finally, the act mandated U.S. recognition of the independence of the Philippine Islands as a separate and self-governing nation after a ten-year transition period.

==== 1934 Philippine Constitutional Convention ====
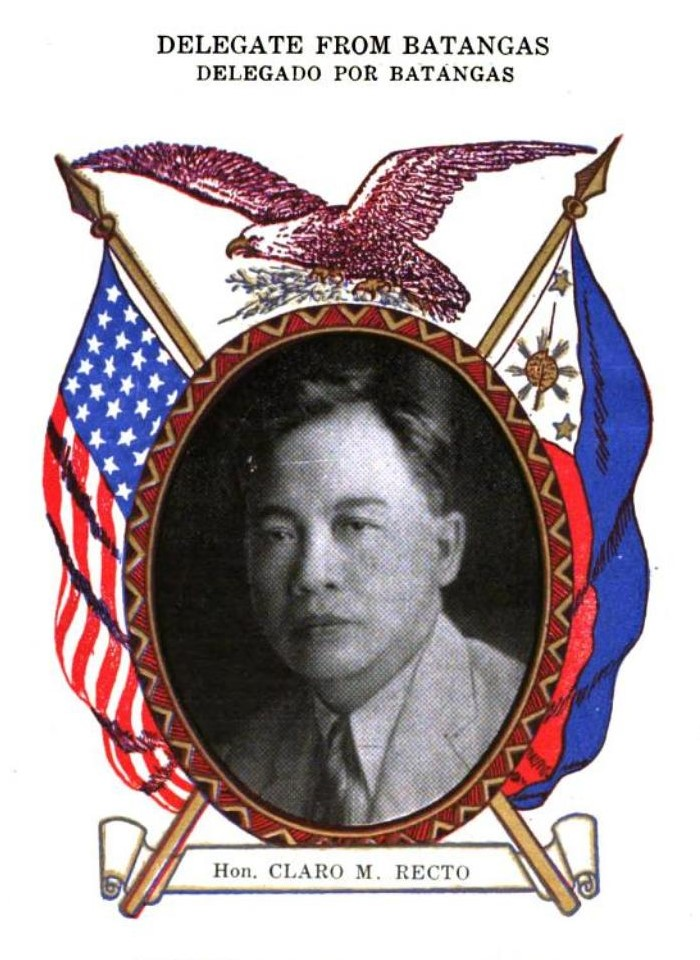
Recto as a delegate to the Philippine Constitutional Convention, published by Benipayo Press (c. 1935)

Recto presided over the 1934 Philippine Constitutional Convention, which that drafted the 1935 Philippine Constitution, from 1934 to 1935, under the stipulations of the Tydings–McDuffie Act. He was the primary author of the constitution, thus becoming known as the "Father of the Philippine Constitution."

Together with Quezon, who was later elected the first president of the Commonwealth of the Philippines, Recto personally presented the 1935 Constitution to United States President Franklin D. Roosevelt. The consensus among many Philippine political scholars of today judges the 1935 Constitution as the best-written Philippine charter ever in terms of prose.

He was appointed Associate Justice of the Supreme Court of the Philippines on July 3, 1935, by President Roosevelt, and would be the last Associate Justice appointed by the United States, holding the position until November 1, 1936.

=== World War II (1939–1945), second term (1941-1946) ===
During World War II, Recto was arrested by the US colonial government for collaboration charges with the Japanese. Despite this, he ran for senator in the 1941 senatorial elections and reaped 1,084,003 votes, the highest number of votes among the 24 elected senators. However, Imperial Japan invaded on December 8, 1941, preventing the elected senators from taking the oath. Thus, they were not seated until 1945.

By 1943, the Commonwealth established a government-in-exile in Washington, DC; however, many politicians stayed behind and collaborated with the occupying Japanese, among them Recto and then-Minister of Interior José P. Laurel. The Japanese installed Laurel as the President of the Second Philippine Republic on October 14, 1943. Recto was appointed Commissioner of Education in 1942 and as Minister of Foreign Affairs from 1943 to 1944. As Minister, he signed the Philippine-Japanese Treaty of Alliance alongside the Japanese Ambassador to the Philippines Sozyo Murata on October 20, 1943.

==== Post-World War II ====
After the war, Recto, along with Laurel, Minister of Education Camilo Osías, and Senator Quintín Paredes, was taken into custody and tried for treason, but he defended himself and was acquitted. He wrote a defense and explanation of his position in Three Years of Enemy Occupation (1946), which presented the case of the "patriotic" conduct of the Filipino elite during World War II.

=== Third term (1949–1955) ===
On April 9, 1949, Recto attacked the impositions of the U.S. government in the Military Bases Agreement of March 14, 1947, and later in the Mutual Defense Treaty of Aug. 30, 1951, and especially the Tydings Rehabilitation Act, which required the enactment of the controversial parity-rights amendment to the constitution. He debated against U.S. President Dwight D. Eisenhower's Attorney General Herbert Brownell Jr. on the question of U.S. ownership of military bases in the Philippines.

Recto was reelected to the Senate on November 8, 1949.

=== Fourth term (1955–1960) and final years ===
In his later years, Recto denounced the influence and coercion of the Catholic Church on voters' decisions—the Philippines had a 90% Catholic majority at the time. In a 1958 article in "The Lawyer's Journal," Recto suggested a constitutional amendment to make the article on the separation of church and state clearer and more definitive. He also argued against the teaching of religion in public schools.

He was reelected to his fourth and final term in the Senate in 1955.

Recto also foresaw the demands of a fast-moving global economy and the challenges it would pose. In a speech on the eve of the 1957 presidential election, he petitioned all sectors of society and implored Philippine youth:

The first task to participate seriously in the economic development of our country (is to) pursue those professions for which there is a great need during an era of rapid industrialization. Only a nationalistic administration can inspire a new idealism in our youth and, with its valid economic program, make our youth respond to the challenging jobs and tasks demanding full use of their talents and energies.

Recto was a staunch critic of the Magsaysay administration, especially with the Laurel-Langley Agreement. This led to his expulsion from the Nacionalista Party. He would then lose the election to incumbent president Carlos P. Garcia, winning just 8 percent of the vote. Garcia later appointed Recto as Cultural Envoy with the rank of Ambassador on a cultural mission to Europe and Latin America in 1960.

== Other activities ==
=== Legal practice ===
Recto was known as an abogado milagroso (lawyer of miracles), a tribute to his many victories in the judicial court.He wrote a three-volume book on civil procedures, which, in the days before World War II was the standard textbook for law students.

His prominence as a lawyer paralleled his fame as a writer. He was known for his logic and lucidity of mind in both undertakings.

Recto took part in many landmark cases. In "Hall v. Piccio" (G.R. No. L-2598), the landmark civil case involving Articles of Incorporation as a requisite to becoming a de facto corporation, Recto lost the case to Ramon Diokno and his son Jose W. "Ka Pepe'' Diokno. Recto and the former later collaborated and won in "Nacionalista Party v. Felix Angelo Bautista", against Felix Angelo Bautista, then the Solicitor-General of the Philippines.

=== Writing ===
He was raised and educated in the Spanish language, his mother tongue alongside Tagalog, and he was also fluent in English. He initially gained fame as a poet while a student at the University of Santo Tomás when he published a book Bajo los Cocoteros (Under the Coconut Trees, 1911), a collection of his poems in Spanish. As a staff writer of El Ideal and La Vanguardia, he wrote a daily column, Primeras Cuartillas (First Sheets), under the pen name "Aristeo Hilario." They were prose and numerous poems of satirical pieces. Some of his works still grace classic poetry anthologies of the Hispanic world.

Among the plays he authored were La Ruta de Damasco (The Route to Damascus, 1918), and Solo entre las sombras (Alone among the Shadows, 1917), lauded not only in the Philippines, but also in Spain and Latin America. Both were produced and staged in Manila to critical acclaim in the mid-1950s.

In 1929, his article Monroismo asiático (Asiatic Monroism) validated his repute as a political satirist. In what was claimed as a commendable study in polemics, he proffered his arguments and defenses in a debate with Dean Máximo Kálaw of the University of the Philippines, where Kálaw championed a version of the Monroe Doctrine with its application to the Asian continent, while Recto took the opposing side. The original Monroe Doctrine (1823) was U.S. President James Monroe's foreign policy of keeping the Americas off-limits to the influence of the Old World, and states that the United States, Mexico, and countries in South and Central America were no longer open to European colonization. Recto was passionately against its implementation in Asia, wary of Japan's preeminence and its aggressive stance towards its neighbors.

In his deliberation, he wrote about foreseeing the danger Japan posed to the Philippines and other Asian countries. His words proved prophetic when Japan invaded and colonized the region, including the Philippines from 1942 to 1945.

His eloquence and facility with the Spanish language were recognized throughout the Hispanic world. The Enciclopedia Universal says of him: "Recto, more than a politician and lawyer, is a Spanish writer, and that among those of his race" (although he had Irish and Spanish ancestors), "there is not and there has been no one who has surpassed him in the mastery of the language of his country's former sovereign."

== Death ==
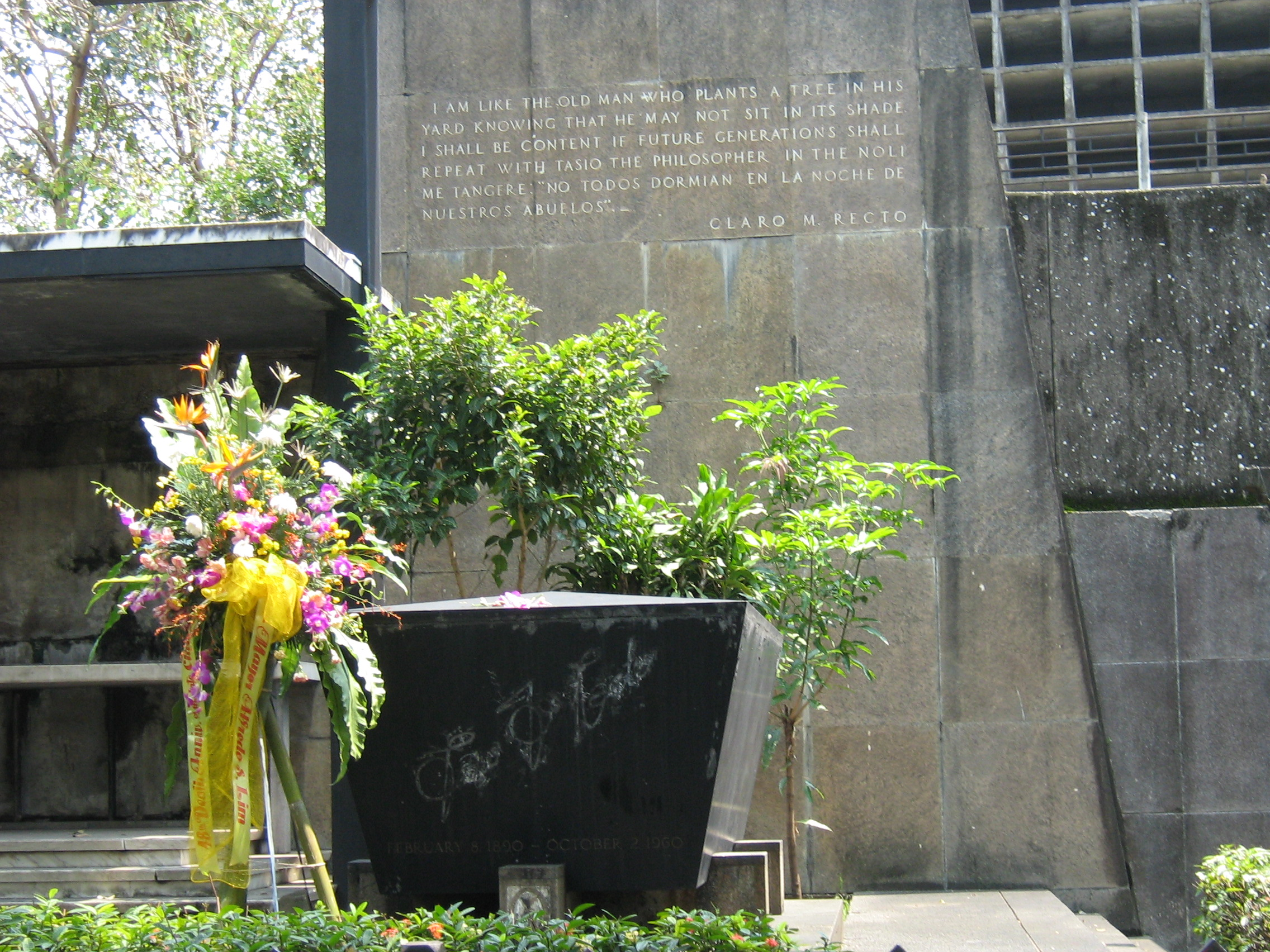
Gravesite of Claro M. Recto at the Manila North Cemetery.

Recto died of a heart attack in Rome, Italy, on October 2, 1960, while on a cultural mission to Spain, where he was to fulfill a series of speaking engagements. His body was flown back to the Philippines to be buried in Manila North Cemetery.

The U.S. Central Intelligence Agency is suspected of involvement in his death. Recto, who had no known heart disease, met with two mysterious Caucasians in business suits before he died. United States government documents later showed that a plan to murder Recto with a vial of poison was discussed by CIA Chief of Station Ralph Lovett and the US Ambassador to the Philippines Admiral Raymond Spruance years earlier.

== Legacy ==
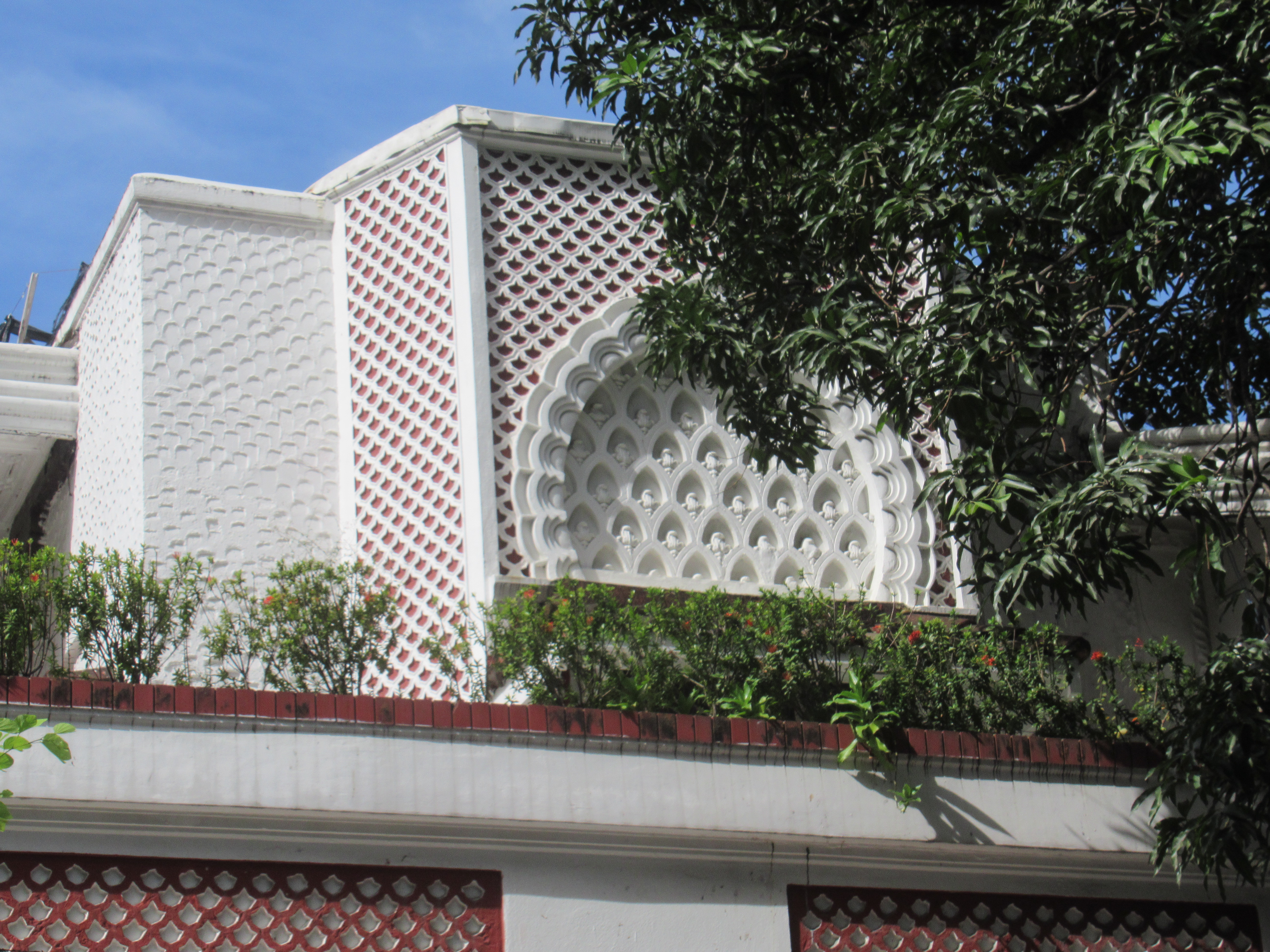
Claro Mayo Recto Jr. house - Leveriza Street, Barangay 15, Pasay City

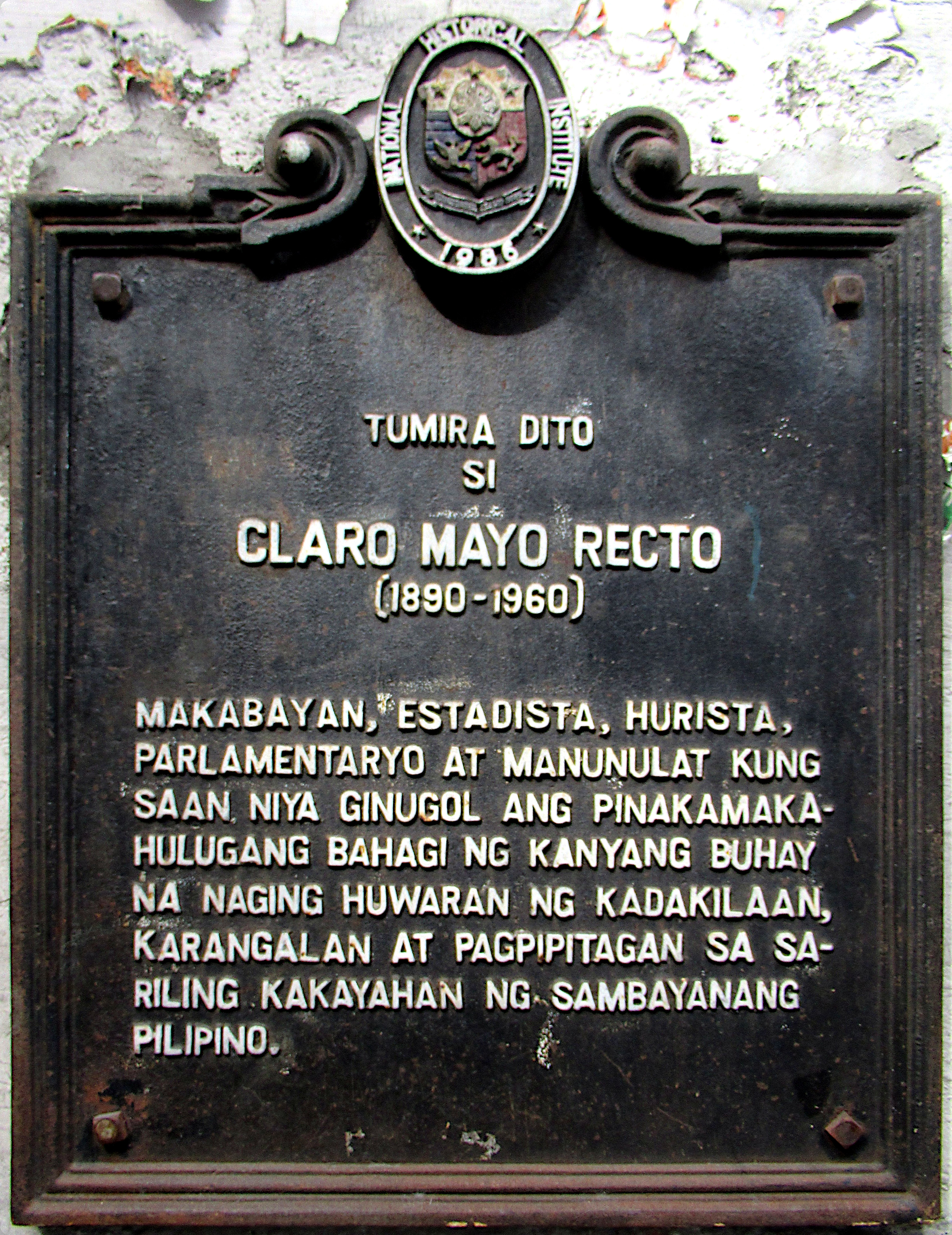
Claro Mayo Recto Jr. house historical marker

Recto is referred to by some as the "Great Academician" or the "finest mind of his generation". Teodoro M. Locsín of Philippines Free Press, defined Recto's genius:

Recto is not a good speaker, no. He will arouse no mob. But heaven help the one whose pretensions he chooses to demolish. His sentences march like ordered battalions against the inmost citadel of the man's arguments and reduce them to rubble; meanwhile, his reservations stand like armed sentries against the most silent approach and every attempt at encirclement by the adversary. The reduction to absurdity of Nacionalista senator Zulueta's conception of sound foreign policy was a shattering experience; the skill that goes into the cutting of a diamond went into the work of demolition. There was no slip of the hand, no flaw in the tool. All was delicately, perfectly done... Recto cannot defend the indefensible, but what can be defended, he will see to it that it will not be taken.

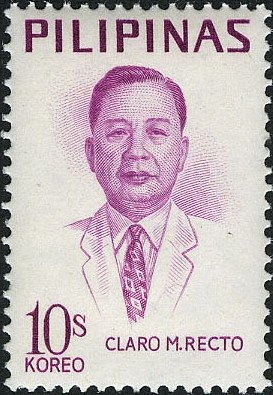
Claro M. Recto in a 1969 postage stamp

Critics claim that Recto's brilliance is overshadowed by his inability to capture nationwide acceptance. His lack of popularity frequently saw him at the bottom of senate votes, and he sometimes lost the senate elections. He was seen as out of touch with the poor and only garnered less than nine percent of votes when he ran for the presidency in 1957. His appeal was limited to the intellectual elite and the nationalist minority of his time, though others argue that he was just too ahead of his time.

Political editorialist Manuel L. Quezon III, laments:

Recto's leadership was the curious kind that only finds fulfillment from being at the periphery of power, and not from being its fulcrum. It was the best occupation suited to the satirist that he was. His success at the polls would be limited, his ability to mold the minds of his contemporaries was only excelled by Rizal's... But he was admired for his intellect and his dogged determination to never let the opposition be bereft of a champion, still, his opposition was flawed. For it was one that never bothered to transform itself into an opposition capable of taking power.

However, one possible explanation as to why Recto was never able to capture full national acceptance was because he dared to strongly oppose the national security interests of the United States in the Philippines, as when he campaigned against the US military bases in his country. During the 1957 presidential campaign, the Central Intelligence Agency (CIA) conducted black propaganda operations to ensure his defeat, including the distribution of condoms with holes in them and marked with `Courtesy of Claro M. Recto' on the labels.

== Family ==
Recto married Ángeles Silos y Jamora on 10 February 1912.

Claro Mayo Recto had seven children in all: four children from his first marriage with Angeles Jamora Silos, and two sons with his second wife, Aurora Reyes. He is the grandfather of Ralph Recto.

His children with Angeles Silos were:

- María Clara Nena Recto Silos (December 29, 1912, Manila - November 16, 1979, Madrid)
- José Recto Silos (born December 8, 1914, Manila)
- Concepción Conchita or Chitang Recto Silos (December 7, 1915, Manila - c. 1970)
- José María Recto Silos (December 19, 1917, Manila – December 17, 1963, Manila)
- María Priscilla Chona Recto Silos (February 5, 1922, Manila - April 4, 1987, Manila)

His children with Aurora Reyes were:

- Rafael Reyes Recto (died 2008) Assemblyman during the Regular Batasang Pambansa, father of Ralph Recto.
- Claro Sebastián Clarito Reyes Recto.

== See also ==
- List of Philippine legislators who died in office

== Bibliography ==
- A realistic economic policy for the Philippines. Speech delivered at the Philippine Columbian Association, September 26, 1956. ISBN B0007KCFEM
- Sovereignty and Nationalism
- On the Formosa Question, 1955 ISBN B0007JI5DI
- United States-Philippine Relations, 1935-1960. Alicia Benitez, ed. University of Hawaii, 1964.
- Three Years of Enemy Occupation: The issue of political collaboration in the Philippines. Filipiniana series, 1985 Filipiana reprint. ISBN B0007K1JRG
- Our trade relations with the United States, 1954 ISBN B0007K8LS6
- The evil of religious test in a democracy, 1960 ISBN B0007K4Y8W
- Solo entre las sombres: Drama en un acto y en prosa, 1917; reprinted 1999 ISBN 971-555-306-0
- Asiatic Monroeism and other essays: Articles of debate, 1930 ISBN B0008A5354
- The law of belligerent occupation and the effect of the change of sovereignty on the commonwealth treason law: With particular reference to the Japanese occupation of the Philippines, 1946
- Our lingering colonial complex, a speech before the Baguio Press Association, 1951
- The Quirino junket: an Objective Appraisal, 1949 ISBN B0007K4A7W
- The Philippine survival: Nationalist essays by Claro M. Recto, 1982
- Claro Recto on our Constitution, Constitutional Amendments and the Constitutional Convention of 1991
- Our mendicant foreign policy, a speech at the commencement exercises, University of the Philippines, 1951
- The Recto Valedictory, a collection of 10 never-delivered speeches, with English translations by Nick Joaquin, 1985

Legal offices
Preceded by Thomas A. Street	Associate Justice of the Supreme Court of the Philippines; 1935–1936	Succeeded by Manuel V. P. Moran
