= Laurel–Langley Agreement =

1955 agreement between the United States and the Philippines

The Laurel–Langley Agreement was a trade agreement signed in December 15, 1954 between the United States and its former colony the Philippines. It was signed by Senator Jose P. Laurel and James Langley. The agreement took effect in 1955 after approval from both Philippine Congress and U.S. Congress.

Following approval in 1955 by the Philippine Congress, President [Dwight] Eisenhower submitted the Agreement to the U.S. Congress, which, on Aug. 1, 1955, enacted the Philippine Trade Agreement Revision Act of 1955, authorizing the President to enter into an executive agreement with the President of the Philippines to revise the Agreement of 1946 in accordance with the Agreement signed on Dec. 15, 1954, as corrected. (69 Stat. 413)

The new revised agreement was signed by Carlos P. Romulo and James Langley in September 6, 1955 at Washington.

It expired in 1974. It was an amendment to the Bell Trade Act, which had given full parity rights to American citizens and businesses.

== Provisions ==
The Laurel–Langley Agreement ended the free American market for sugar produced in the Philippines; it had been, before the agreement, exported to the U.S. duty-free. After the 1960s, exports from the Philippines increased significantly due to the American embargo against Cuba.

The agreement also ended the authority of the United States to control the exchange rate of the Philippine peso. Up until the agreement, it had been pegged to the American dollar at the rate of two pesos to one dollar.

== Reception ==
Senator Claro M. Recto criticized the agreement due its flaws. These deficiencies include the opening of the Philippine economy to American capitalists and reviving competition which led to large deficits between local and foreign goods. American businessmen also took advantage of this agreement exempting them from the Retail Trade Nationalization law.
