= 1931 Philippine Senate elections =

6th Philippine senatorial election

- June 2, 1931

11 of the 24 seats in the Philippine Senate
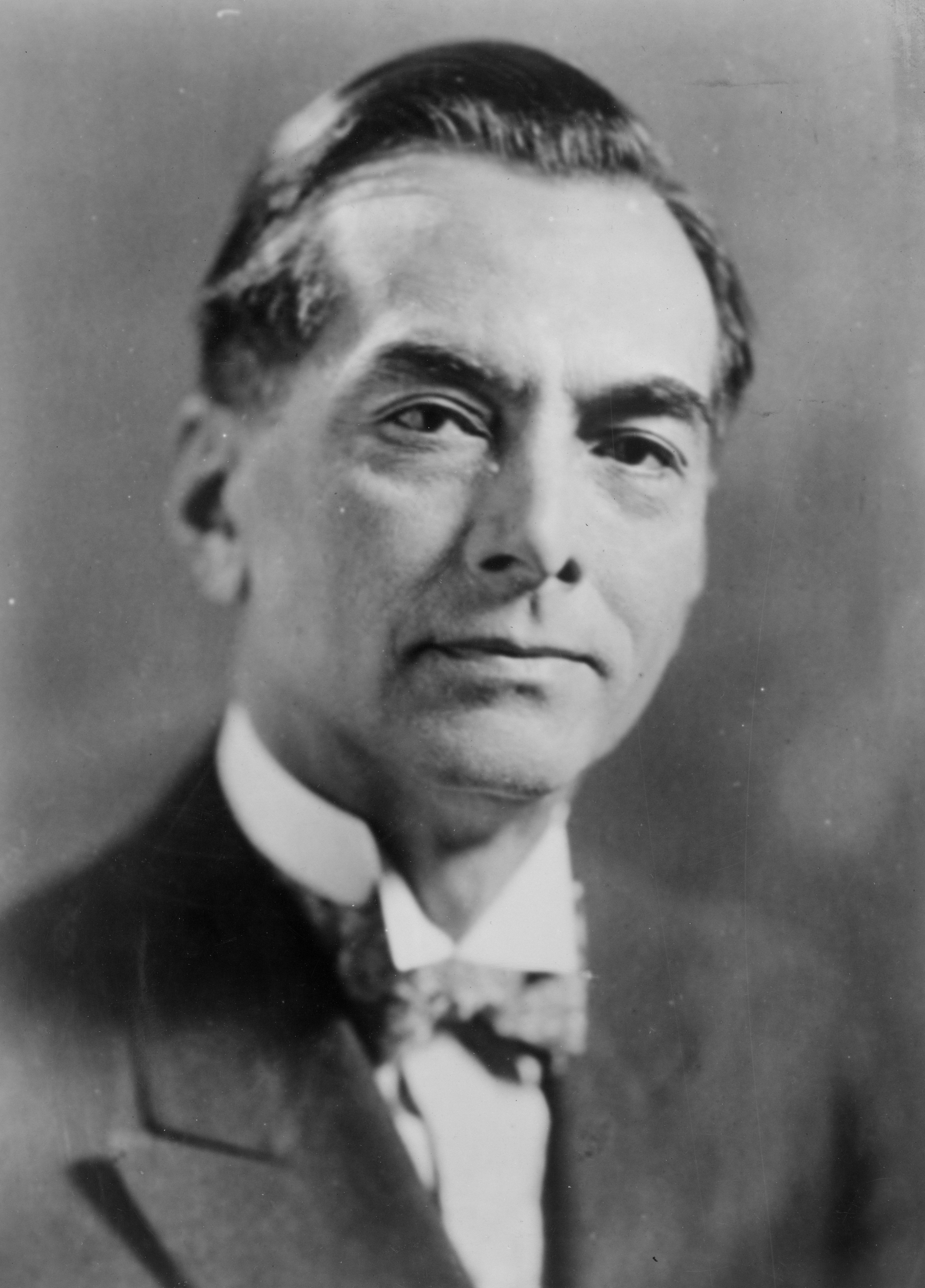

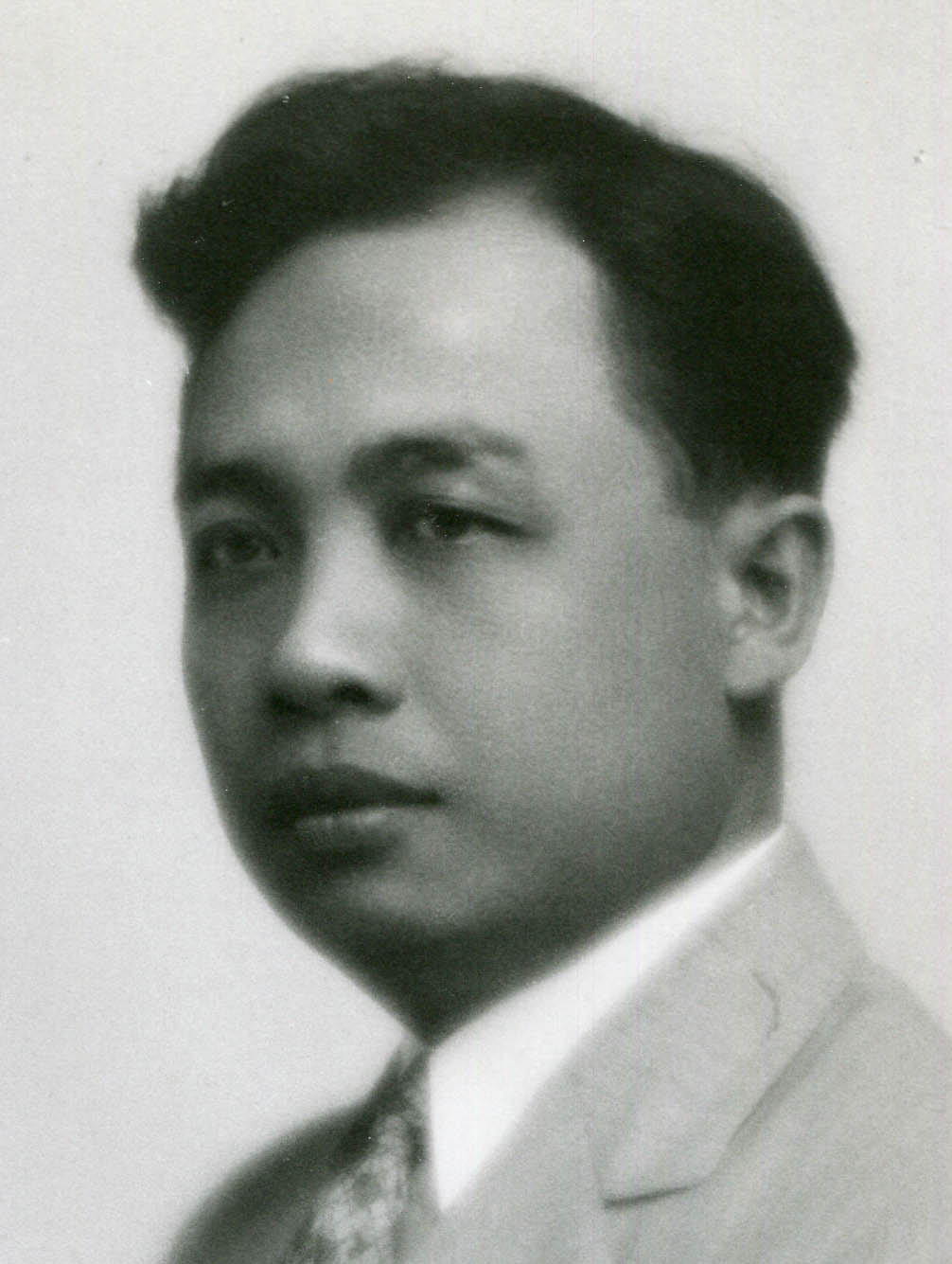
	Majority party	Minority party
Leader	Manuel L. Quezon	Claro M. Recto
Party	Nacionalista	Democrata
Leader's seat	5th District	5th District
Seats before	17	6
Seats won	7	4
Seats after	17	6
Seat change	Steady	Steady
- Election results; each district sent in two seats to the Senate. 2 Nacionalistas 1 Nacionalista and 1 Democrata 1 Nacionalista and 1 Independent
Senate President before election
Manuel L. Quezon
Nacionalista
Elected Senate President
Manuel L. Quezon
Nacionalista

Legislative elections happened on June 2, 1931 in the Philippines under the Jones Law provisions.

== Electoral system ==
In a staggered election, the seats of the senators who were first disputed in 1919 were up for election. The Philippines is divided into 12 senatorial districts, of which all districts save for the 12th district, has one of its seats up. In the 12th district, any vacancy is filled via appointment of the Governor-General. The election itself is via first-past-the-post.

== Results ==
↓

17	1	6
Nacionalista	I	Democrata

=== Philippines's 1st senatorial district ===
Candidate	Party	Votes	%
Elpidio Quirino	Partido Nacionalista Consolidado	39,011	42.28
Benito T. Soliven	Partido Nacionalista Consolidado	28,459	30.85
Santiago Fonacier	Partido Nacionalista Consolidado	19,289	20.91
Romarico Agcaoili	Partido Democrata Nacional	5,504	5.97
Total		92,263	100.00
Total votes		92,263	–

=== Philippines's 2nd senatorial district ===
Candidate	Party	Votes	%
Alejo Mabanag	Partido Democrata Nacional	58,933	54.65
Alejandro de Guzman	Partido Nacionalista Consolidado	48,914	45.35
Total		107,847	100.00
Total votes		107,847	–

=== Philippines's 3rd senatorial district ===
Candidate	Party	Votes	%
Sotero Baluyut	Partido Nacionalista Consolidado	75,353	56.74
Jose Padilla Sr.	Partido Democrata Nacional	57,444	43.26
Total		132,797	100.00
Total votes		132,797	–

=== Philippines's 4th senatorial district ===
Candidate	Party	Votes	%
Juan Nolasco	Partido Nacionalista Consolidado	42,163	41.44
Gregorio Perfecto	Partido Democrata Nacional	37,709	37.07
Eulogio Benitez	Partido Radikal	15,865	15.59
Crisanto Evangelista	Partido Komunista ng Pilipinas-1930	6,000	5.90
Total		101,737	100.00
Total votes		101,737	–

=== Philippines's 5th senatorial district ===
Candidate	Party	Votes	%
Claro M. Recto	Partido Democrata Nacional	65,608	54.58
Jose P. Laurel	Partido Nacionalista Consolidado	54,594	45.42
Total		120,202	100.00
Total votes		120,202	–

=== Philippines's 6th senatorial district ===
Candidate	Party	Votes	%
Juan B. Alegre	Partido Democrata Nacional	54,483	54.26
Jose O. Vera	Partido Nacionalista Consolidado	45,924	45.74
Total		100,407	100.00
Total votes		100,407	–

=== Philippines's 7th senatorial district ===
Candidate	Party	Votes	%
Ruperto Montinola	Partido Democrata Nacional	41,032	55.12
Serafin Villanueva	Partido Nacionalista Consolidado	33,413	44.88
Total		74,445	100.00
Total votes		74,445	–

=== Philippines's 8th senatorial district ===
Candidate	Party	Votes	%
Gil Montilla	Partido Nacionalista Consolidado	75,772	46.33
Matias Hilado	Partido Nacionalista Consolidado	69,538	42.52
Jose Locsin	Partido Democrata Nacional	11,324	6.92
Eulalio del Pilar	Partido Nacionalista Consolidado	6,897	4.22
Total		163,531	100.00
Total votes		163,531	–

=== Philippines's 9th senatorial district ===
Candidate	Party	Votes	%
Jose Maria Veloso	Partido Democrata Nacional	43,252	52.16
Jorge B. Delgado	Partido Nacionalista Consolidado	39,677	47.84
Total		82,929	100.00
Total votes		82,929	–

=== Philippines's 10th senatorial district ===
Candidate	Party	Votes	%
Manuel Briones	Partido Nacionalista Consolidado	65,034	73.49
Vicente Sotto	Partido Democrata Nacional	23,412	26.46
Nicolas Veloso	Independent	42	0.05
Pedro Rodriguez	Independent	0	0.00
Total		88,488	100.00
Total votes		88,488	–

=== Philippines's 11th senatorial district ===
Candidate	Party	Votes	%
Juan Torralba	Independent	29,854	47.23
Jose Artadi	Partido Nacionalista Consolidado	24,854	39.32
Pedro Coleto	Partido Democrata Nacional	8,508	13.46
Total		63,216	100.00
Total votes		63,216	–

=== Philippines's 12th senatorial district* ===
Candidate	Party
Jamalul Kiram II	Independent
Ludovico Hidrosollo	Partido Nacionalista Consolidado
Total

- Non-elective positions. Appointed by the American Governor-General

=== August 18, 1931 Special Election for Philippines's 6th senatorial district ===
To serve the unexpired term of Senator Juan B. Alegre, who died in office on June 14, 1931. The winner will serve until 1935.

Candidate	Party	Votes	%
Jose O. Vera	Partido Nacionalista	22,476	53.45
Julian Ocampo	Partido Democrata Nacional	19,572	46.55
Total		42,048	100.00

Party	Seats				
Party	Up	Before	Won	After	+/−
Nacionalista	7	16	7	16	0
Democrata	4	6	4	6	0
Appointed (Note: Of the two appointed senators, one was from the Nacionalista and one was independent.)	0	2	0	2	0
Total	11	24	11	24	0

== See also ==
- Commission on Elections
- Politics of the Philippines
- Philippine elections
