= Antero Soriano =

Filipino politician

Antero S. Soriano
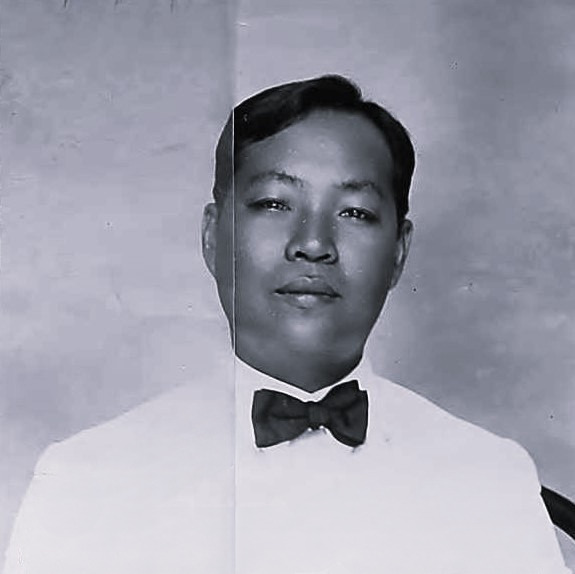
- Soriano in 1922

Member of the House of Representatives from Cavite's at-large congressional district
- In office August 15, 1925 – June 15, 1929
- Preceded by: Augusto Reyes
- Succeeded by: Fidel Ibañez

Senator of the Philippines from the 5th District
- In office June 3, 1919 – June 2, 1925
- Preceded by: Vicente Ilustre
- Succeeded by: José P. Laurel

9th Governor of Cavite
- In office 1912–1919
- Preceded by: Tomás Mascardo
- Succeeded by: Luis Ferrer, Sr.

Personal details
- Born: January 3, 1886 Santa Cruz de Malabon, Cavite, Captaincy General of the Philippines
- Died: June 15, 1929 (aged 43) Tanza, Cavite, Philippines
- Party: Nacionalista
- Spouse(s): Gerarda Aquino (m. 1907; died 1914) Maximina Salud
- Children: 11
- Education: Escuela de Derecho de Manila
- Profession: Lawyer

Antero Sosa Soriano (January 3, 1886 – June 15, 1929) was a Filipino lawyer and politician from Tanza, Cavite, who had served as congressman, senator, and governor of Cavite.

== Early life ==
Antero Soriano was born in Santa Cruz de Malabon (present day Tanza) in Cavite to Adriano Soriano and Aurea Sosa on January 3, 1886. He studied in Liceo de Manila, graduating and receiving his degree of Bachelor of Arts in 1904. He studied law in the famous Escuela de Derecho (now Manila Law College Foundation) in Manila until September 1907, when he presented himself for examination with one hundred other students before an examining tribunal nominated by the Supreme Court of the Philippines. Only five applicants passed and Soriano was one of them. He started practicing law immediately. He then became the lawyer of the Manila Railroad Company.

== Political career ==
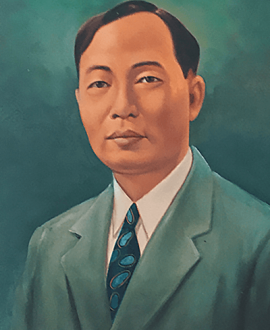
Portrait of Soriano from the local government of Cavite

In June 1912, Soriano was elected governor of the province of Cavite at the age of 26. He was then re-elected in 1916. He was elected senator from the 5th District in 1919. He was the chairman of the committee on the Manila Railroad, chairman of the special committee on distribution of public work funds, and a member of the Senate committee on Agricultural and Natural Resources. He is also a member of a special committee appointed to investigate the alleged "land trust" in the Philippines. He lost his re-election bid in 1925 to former Interior Secretary Jose P. Laurel.

He was appointed member of the Philippine Independence Mission, and upon arriving in the United States, was made Chairman of a committee to investigate the Philippine Press Bureau in Washington, D.C. and recommended its continuance.

On August 15, 1925, Soriano was elected as a representative of the at-large district of Cavite through a special election. He filled the vacancy created by the death of representative Augusto Reyes on July 3, days before the opening of the 7th Philippine Legislature. He was then re-elected to a fresh full term in 1928.

== Death ==
Soriano died in office on June 15, 1929.

== Personal life ==
On December 5, 1907, Soriano married Gerarda Aquino but was widowed on July 12, 1914. He then remarried with Maximina Salud. He had 11 children.

== Legacy ==
The Antero Soriano Highway, the road on the northwestern coast of Cavite, was named after him in accordance with Republic Act 5782 enacted on July 21, 1969.
