= 1934 Philippine Constitutional Convention election =

Philippine election

Election of delegates to the 1934 Philippine Constitutional Convention was held on July 10, 1934, in accordance with the Tydings–McDuffie Act.

The Convention drafted the 1935 Constitution, which was the basic law of the Philippines under the American-sponsored Commonwealth of the Philippines and the post-War, sovereign Third Republic.

== Results ==
Party	Votes	%	Seats
Nonpartisan	873,021	100.00	202
Total	873,021	100.00	202
Total votes	873,021	–	
Registered voters/turnout	1,704,095	51.23	

Province/City	Electorate	Votes cast	%
Abra	11,244	7,083	63.0
Agusan	8,687	5,781	66.5
Albay	50,328	25,460	50.6
Antique	18,036	8,988	49.8
Baguio	2,260	1,255	55.5
Bataan	14,931	10,158	68.0
Batanes	1,800	1,318	73.2
Batangas	59,585	38,159	64.0
Bohol	47,240	23,361	49.5
Bulacan	57,784	33,653	58.2
Cagayan	36,689	19,424	52.9
Camarines Norte	11,392	6,441	56.5
Camarines Sur	38,798	19,577	50.5
Capiz	36,742	13,063	35.6
Cavite	39,823	22,844	57.4
Cebu	105,792	48,734	46.1
Davao	18,933	9,616	50.8
Ilocos Norte	30,088	20,649	68.6
Ilocos Sur	39,014	19,529	50.1
Iloilo	81,653	43,492	53.3
Isabela	23,321	13,760	59.0
La Union	30,631	17,890	58.4
Laguna	49,181	25,704	52.3
Leyte	84,348	44,645	52.9
Manila	70,082	26,474	37.8
Marinduque	11,006	7,999	72.7
Masbate	14,296	7,276	50.9
Mindoro	15,757	9,914	62.9
Misamis Occidental	18,552	7,973	43.0
Misamis Oriental	19,185	10,058	52.4
Negros Occidental	85,566	32,594	38.1
Negros Oriental	28,101	14,437	51.4
Nueva Ecija	58,146	28,834	49.6
Nueva Vizcaya	9,553	6,382	66.8
Palawan	8,601	4,892	56.9
Pampanga	52,296	31,581	60.4
Pangasinan	114,264	57,100	50.0
Rizal	68,311	33,630	49.2
Romblon	7,597	4,056	53.4
Samar	42,946	23,621	55.0
Sorsogon	31,749	16,936	53.3
Surigao	21,767	10,021	46.0
Tarlac	33,212	14,266	43.0
Tayabas	60,898	23,986	39.4
Zambales	15,432	8,986	58.2
Zamboanga	18,478	11,421	61.8
Total	1,704,095	873,021	51.2
Source: Bureau of Printing

== See also ==
- Commission on Elections
- Politics of the Philippines
- Philippine elections
- Philippine Constitution
