= Jose P. Laurel Residence =

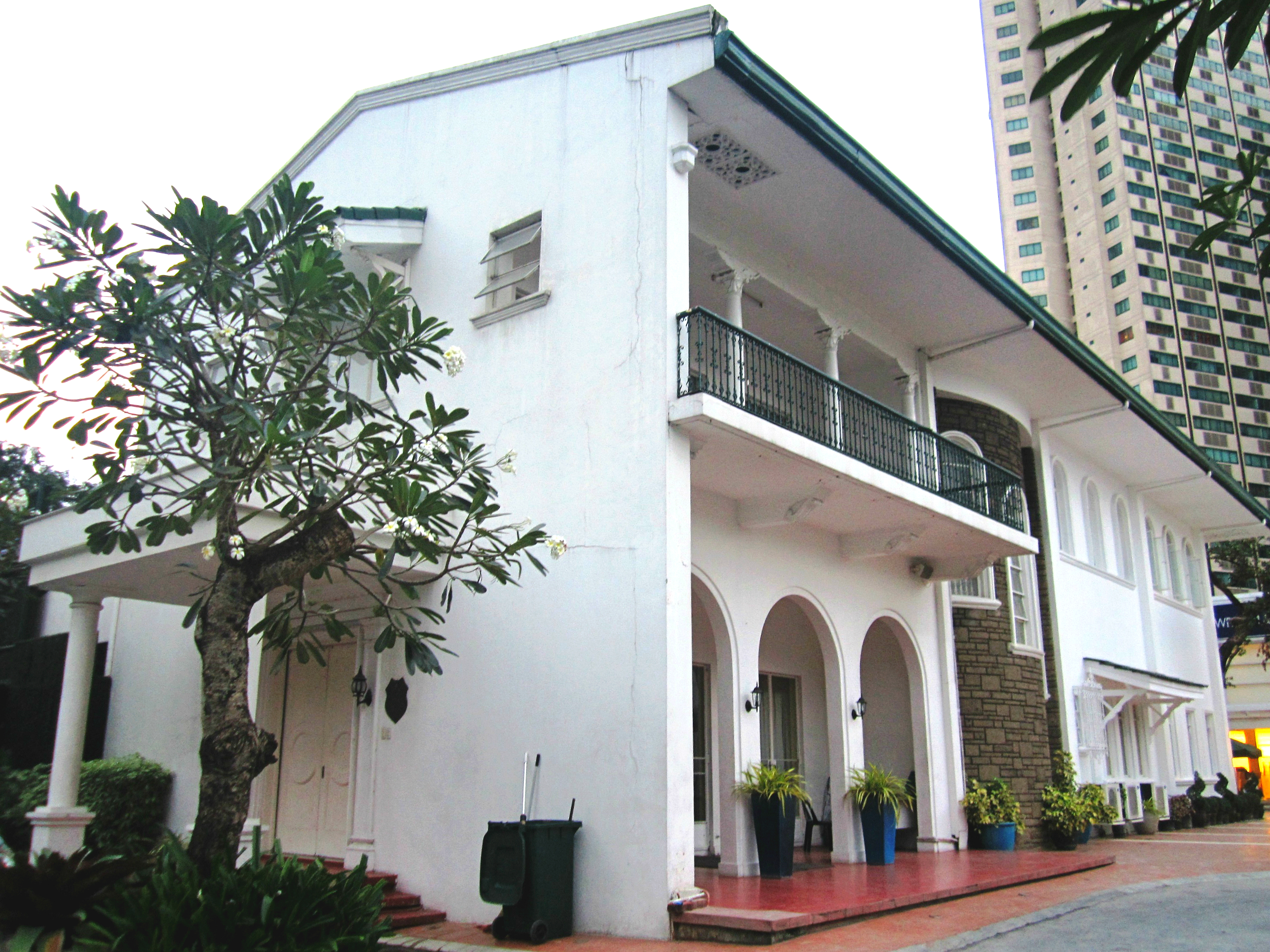
- The house in 2014
- Alternative names: Villa Pacencia; Laurel Mansion; Villar SIPAG: The Laurel House

General information
- Status: Completed
- Type: Residential House
- Location: 515 Shaw Boulevard, Mandaluyong, Philippines
- Coordinates: 14°35′17.79″N 121°2′43.46″E
- Completed: 1957

The Jose P. Laurel Residence, also known as Villa Pacencia, Laurel Mansion, and Villar SIPAG: The Laurel House, is a historic house located at 515 Shaw Boulevard in Mandaluyong, Metro Manila. The three-story house was built in 1957 and was one of the three houses owned by the President of the Second Republic of the Philippines, José P. Laurel.

In 1965, two historical markers were installed at the house entrance. The first marker was placed by the National Historical Commission of the Philippines in recognition of the building as the official residence of José P. Laurel. The second marker notes of the First Indonesian President Sukarno's stay in the mansion during a Manila Conference on August 5, 1963.

After Laurel's death in 1959, the house was inherited by his eldest son José Jr. In the 2000s, the Laurel family sold it to Manny Villar and his wife Cynthia Villar before it was turned over to their real estate company Vista Land for the development of the surrounding Vista Shaw residential community.

== History ==
=== Construction ===
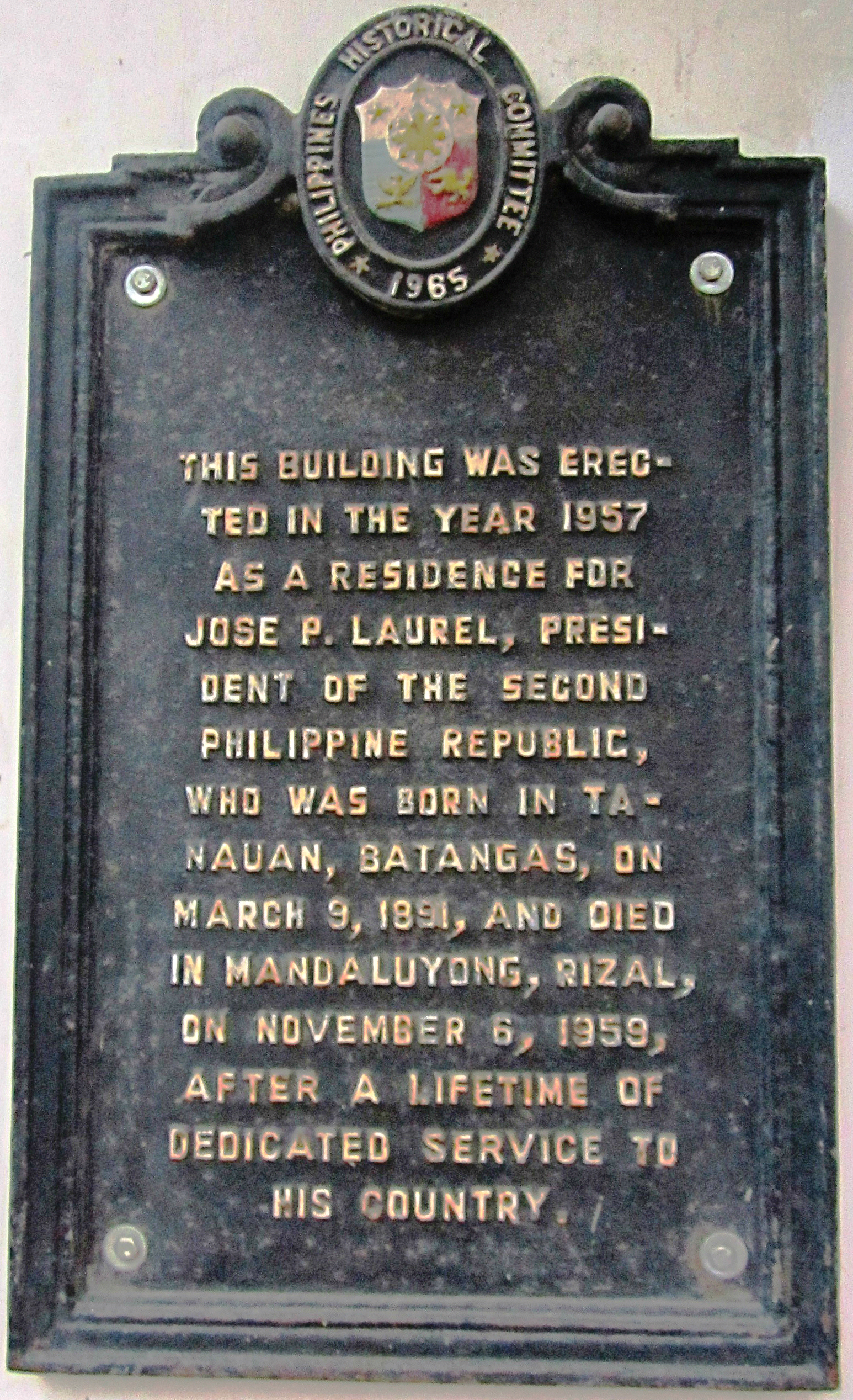
Historical marker of the residence.

Years after serving his term as president of the Second Republic from 1943 to 1945, José P. Laurel built a three-story house near the Wack Wack Golf and Country Club in Mandaluyong (then a town in the province of Rizal) that occupied 1,000 square meters (11,000 sq ft) of the land once overrun with cogon. The house was named Villa Pacencia in honor of his wife, Pacencia Hidalgo y Valencia.

=== Site of Political Events ===
The house was the venue of several political events. In 1957, Laurel hosted a luncheon at the mansion in honor of James M. Langley, a New Hampshire newspaper publisher. Laurel and Langley signed the Laurel-Langley Agreement in 1954, which amended the Bell Trade Act of 1946 and provided for an increase in the duties imposed on U.S. products and a decrease in the duties imposed on Philippine goods.

The mansion became the de facto Nacionalista Party headquarters when José Laurel Jr. acquired the property after his father's death in November 1959.

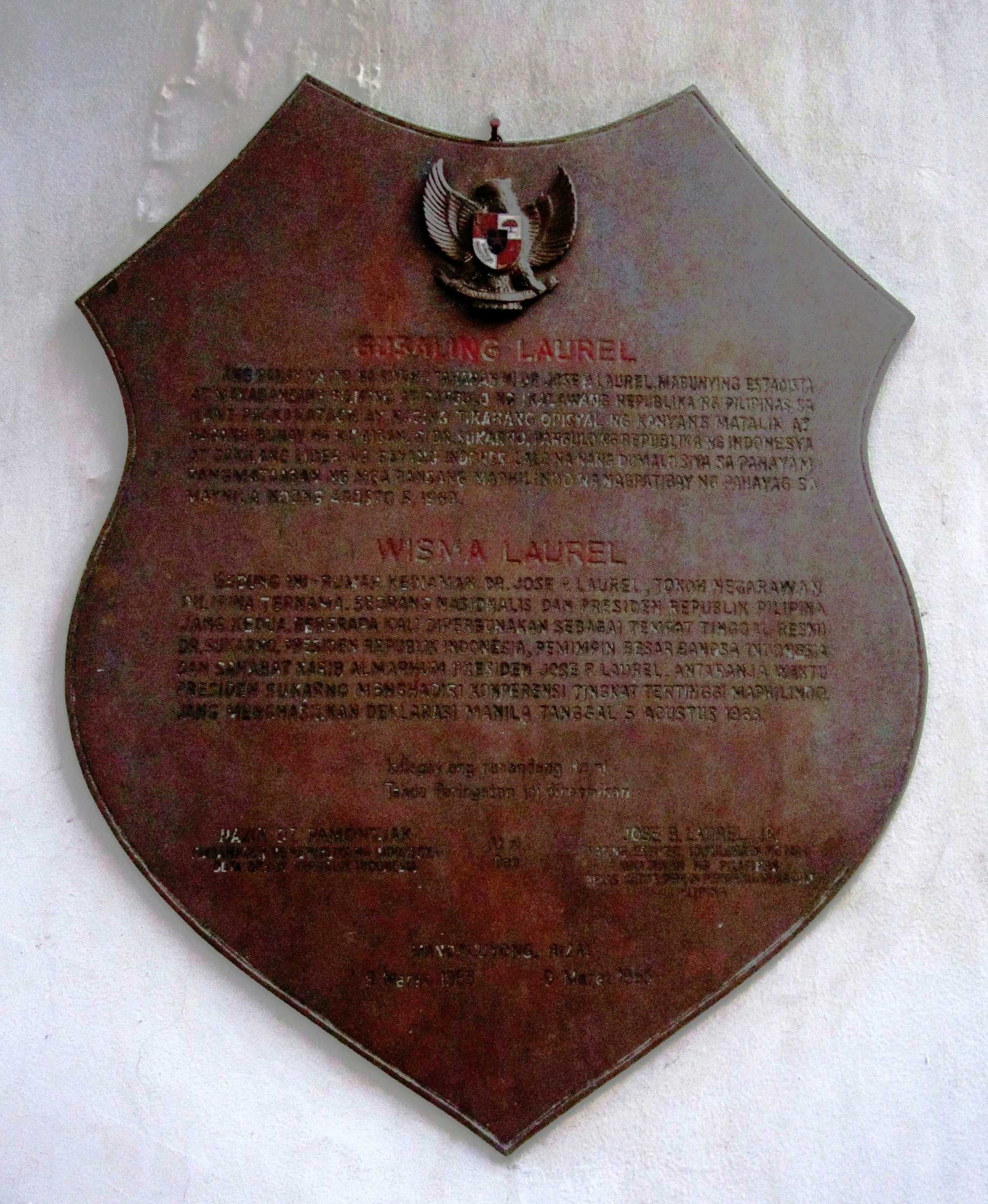
A historical marker noting Indonesian President Sukarno's visit to the Laurel Residence in 1963

On August 5, 1963, the first Indonesian President Sukarno stayed at the mansion during his working visit in the Philippines for the Manila Summit Conference on Maphilindo. A marker with Filipino and Bahasa Indonesia text was installed at the house entrance on March 9, 1965, documenting this historical event.

=== Present ===
The Laurel family sold the property to then-Senator and Nacionalista Party President, Manny Villar, and his wife, then-Las Piñas Representative Cynthia Villar, in 2008. It served as a venue for some political events leading to Manny Villar's unsuccessful 2010 presidential campaign.

The property was later turned over to Vista Land & Lifescapes, Inc., a real estate company owned by Manny Villar, as the area was to be developed into Vista Shaw, a high-rise development project. There were plans on converting the mansion into a museum, housing various memorabilia from José P. Laurel. It is also being used as an events venue known as Villar SIPAG: The Laurel House, with parts of the house allotted as a dining space.

== See also ==
- Jose P. Laurel Ancestral House (Manila)
