= Laurel family (Philippines) =

Political and entertainment family

- Filipino political family
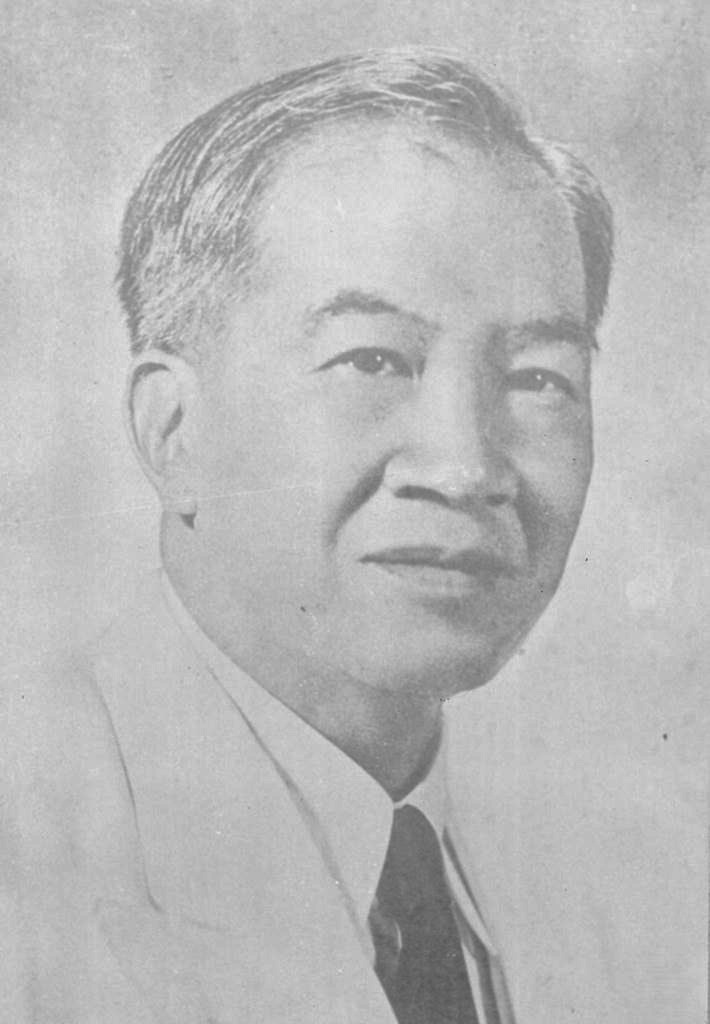
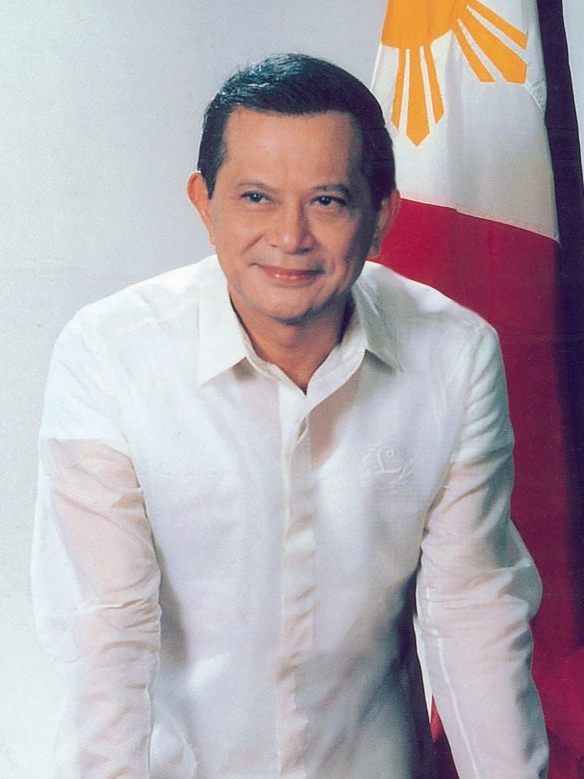
- Jose P. Laurel Salvador Laurel
- Country: Philippines
- Current region: Batangas
- Members: See table below
- Traditions: Roman Catholicism

The Laurel family is a Filipino family of politicians and entertainers.

== List of members ==
1. Jose P. Laurel
  1. ∞ married Pacencia Hidalgo
    1. Jose Laurel Jr.
      1. ∞ married Remedios Lerma
        1. Jose Laurel IV
          1. ∞ married Violeta Albert Reyes, they had five children.
        2. Banjo Laurel
        3. Lally Laurel
          1. ∞ married Noel Trinidad, an actor
            1. Joel Trinidad
    2. Jose Laurel III
      1. ∞ married Beatriz Castillo
        1. Jose Laurel V
        2. Ma. Elena Laurel
          1. ∞ married Loinaz
        3. Francis Laurel
          1. ∞ married Fely Reyes
            1. Franco Laurel
              1. ∞ married Ayen Munji, together they have five children.
            2. Rally Laurel
            3. Martin Laurel
            4. Sandra Laurel
            5. Yanah Laurel, a singer
        4. Mercedes Laurel
          1. ∞ married Marquez, they have two children
            1. Kenji Motoki, model and actor
    3. Natividad Laurel
      1. ∞ married Guinto
    4. Sotero Laurel
      1. ∞ married Lorna P. Laurel, they had eight children
        1. Roberto Laurel
        2. Peter Laurel
    5. Mariano Laurel
    6. Rosenda Laurel
      1. ∞ married Avanceña
    7. Potenciana Laurel
      1. ∞ married Yupangco
    8. Salvador Laurel
      1. ∞ married Celia Diaz, they had eight children.
        1. Susana Laurel
        2. Celine Laurel
        3. Cocoy Laurel
        4. David Laurel
          1. ∞ married Ruby Sanz
            1. Denise Laurel
              1. has a son, Alejandro Laurel
        5. Lorenzo Laurel
        6. Iwi Laurel, a singer
          1. ∞ married Asensio
            1. Nicole Asensio, a singer and actress
      2. with actress Pilar Pilapil, fathered
        1. Pia Pilapil
          1. ∞ married Jerry Gonzalo, they have four children.
    9. Arsenio Laurel
      1. ∞ married Maria Paz Rufino, they had five children.
