= Jose Laurel IV =

Filipino lawyer and politician (1932–2025)

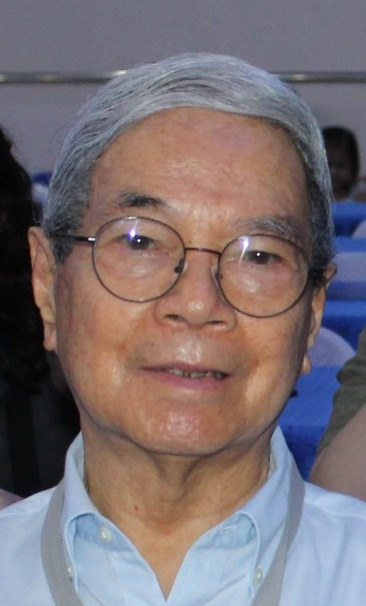
- Laurel in 2023

Member of the Philippine House of Representatives for Batangas's 3rd district
- In office June 30, 1998 – June 30, 2001
- Preceded by: Milagros Laurel-Trinidad
- Succeeded by: Victoria Hernandez-Reyes
- In office December 30, 1957 – December 30, 1961
- Preceded by: Jose Laurel Jr.
- Succeeded by: Jose Laurel Jr.

Ambassador of the Philippines to Brazil
- In office September 9, 1993 – March 17, 1996
- President: Fidel V. Ramos
- Preceded by: Lauro Baja
- Succeeded by: Francisco L. Benedicto

President of the United Nationalist Democratic Organization
- In office 2021 – June 23, 2025
- Preceded by: Salvador Laurel

Personal details
- Born: Jose Macario Lerma Laurel IV; April 10, 1932
- Died: June 23, 2025 (aged 93)
- Party: UNIDO (2021–2025)
- Other political affiliations: Independent (2001–2021); Lakas (1998–2001); Nacionalista (1957–1998)
- Spouse: Violeta Albert Reyes
- Children: 5
- Parents: Jose Laurel Jr. (father); Remedios Lerma (mother)
- Relatives: Laurel family
- Nickname: Cario

Jose Macario "Cario" Lerma Laurel IV (April 10, 1932 – June 23, 2025) was a Filipino lawyer, banker, diplomat, and politician who served as the 6th Ambassador of the Philippines to Brazil from 1993 to 1996. He also served as a member of the House of Representatives for Batangas's 3rd congressional district from 1957 to 1961 and 1998 to 2001.

== Early life and education ==
Laurel was born on April 10, 1932 to Jose Laurel Jr., who would later serve as speaker of the House of Representatives, and Remedios Lerma. He attended the University of the Philippines for his secondary education, graduating in 1950. He later earned a Bachelor of Laws degree from the Lyceum of the Philippines, which was founded by his grandfather, President Jose P. Laurel, in 1956.

== Career ==
In 1957, Laurel was first elected to the House of Representatives as a member for Batangas's 3rd congressional district when his father, then-speaker Jose Laurel Jr., unsuccessfully ran for the vice presidency.

In 1965, Laurel founded Combined Services Incorporated (later known as Combined Blue Dragon Security and Services), a security and manpower agency. He was also a notable banker, having served as a director of the Philippine National Bank in the 1960s.

Laurel was appointed Ambassador of the Philippines to Brazil by President Fidel V. Ramos in September 1993. He later served as president of the Philippine Ambassadors Foundation Incorporated.

He later won his former congressional seat in 1998, succeeding his sister Milagros Laurel-Trinidad, and served until 2001. As representative during the 11th Congress, Laurel was the chairperson of the House Committee on Banks and Financial Intermediaries, vice chairperson of the House Committee on Foreign Affairs, and a member of the House Committees on Public Order and Security, National Defense, Agriculture and Food, and Government Enterprises and Privatization.

In 2021, upon the revival of the United Nationalist Democratic Organization as a regional political party, Laurel served as its party president until his death in 2025.

== Personal life ==
Laurel married Violeta Albert Reyes, with whom he had five children. He died on June 23, 2025.

== Electoral history ==
Electoral history of Jose Laurel IV
Year	Office	Party	Votes received				Result
Year	Office	Party	Total	%	P.	Swing	Result
1957	Representative (Batangas–3rd)	Nacionalista	—N/a	—N/a	1st	—N/a	Won
1998	Representative (Batangas–3rd)	Lakas	87,886	63.67%	1st	—N/a	Won

House of Representatives of the Philippines
Preceded by Milagros Laurel-Trinidad	Member of the Philippine House of Representatives for Batangas's 3rd district 1998–2001	Succeeded by Victoria Hernandez-Reyes
Preceded by Jose Laurel Jr.	Member of the Philippine House of Representatives for Batangas's 3rd district 1957–1961	Succeeded by Jose Laurel Jr.
Diplomatic posts
Preceded by Lauro Baja	Ambassador of the Philippines to Brazil; 1993–1996	Succeeded by Francisco L. Benedicto
Party political offices
Preceded by Salvador Laurel	President of the United Nationalist Democratic Organization; 2021–2025	Unknown
