= List of ambassadors of the Philippines to Brazil =

Ambassador of the Republic of the Philippines to the Federative Republic of Brazil
- Sugo ng Republika ng Pilipinas sa Pederatibong Republika ng Brasil; Embaixador da República das Filipinas em República Federativa do Brasil
- Seal of the Department of Foreign Affairs of the Philippines
- Incumbent; Patrick John U. Hilado since 6 May 2026
- Department of Foreign Affairs; Embassy of the Philippines, Brasília
- Style: His/Her Excellency
- Reports to: Department of Foreign Affairs
- Seat: Brasília, Brazil
- Nominator: President of the Philippines
- Appointer: President of the Philippines; with the advice and consent of the Commission on Appointments
- Term length: No fixed term
- Inaugural holder: Carlos S. Tan
- Formation: 16 September 1965
- Website: Philippine Embassy, Brasília

The ambassador of the Republic of the Philippines to the Federative Republic of Brazil (Filipino: Sugo ng Republika ng Pilipinas sa Pederatibong Republika ng Brasil, Portuguese: Embaixador da República das Filipinas em República Federativa do Brasil) is the Republic of the Philippines' foremost diplomatic representative in Brazil. As head of the Philippines' diplomatic mission there, the ambassador is the official representative of the president and the government of the Philippines to the president and government of Brazil. The position has the rank and status of an ambassador extraordinary and plenipotentiary and is based at the embassy in Brasília, the country's capital.

This diplomatic post is also accredited as a non-resident ambassador to the countries of Guyana and Suriname.

== List of heads of mission ==
Image	Head of mission	Tenure	Note(s)
	Carlos S. Tan	1965–1970	
	Octavio L. Maloles	1970–1978	
	Emilio Dimayuga Bejasa	1978–1980	
	Sergio A. Barrera	5 August 1980 – August 1986	
	Lauro L. Baja Jr.	5 September 1986 – 27 August 1993	
	Jose Laurel IV	9 September 1993 – 17 March 1996	
	Francisco L. Benedicto	31 July 1996 – 25 November 1998	
	Oscar G. Valenzuela	20 March 1999 – 21 March 2005	
	Teresita V.G. Barsana	8 October 2005 – 22 December 2009	
	Eva G. Betita	13 April 2010 – 4 October 2014	
	Jose D. R. Burgos	March 2015 – March 2017	
	Marichu B. Mauro	7 April 2018 – 30 October 2020	Recalled after she attracted controversy over abusing a helper.
	Mario F. Chan	1 December 2021 – February 2023	Credentials were presented on 10 February 2022.
	Joseph Gerard B. Angeles	3 February 2023 – 2025	Credentials were presented on 3 February 2023.
	Patrick John U. Hilado	6 May 2026 – present	Appointed as an ambassador, which was confirmed by the Commission on Appointments on 3 September 2025. Credentials were presented on 6 May 2026.
Source: Embassy of the Philippines, Brasília
