= Jose P. Laurel Ancestral House (Manila) =

Historic house in Manila, Philippines

Coordinates: 14°34′47″N 120°59′50″E

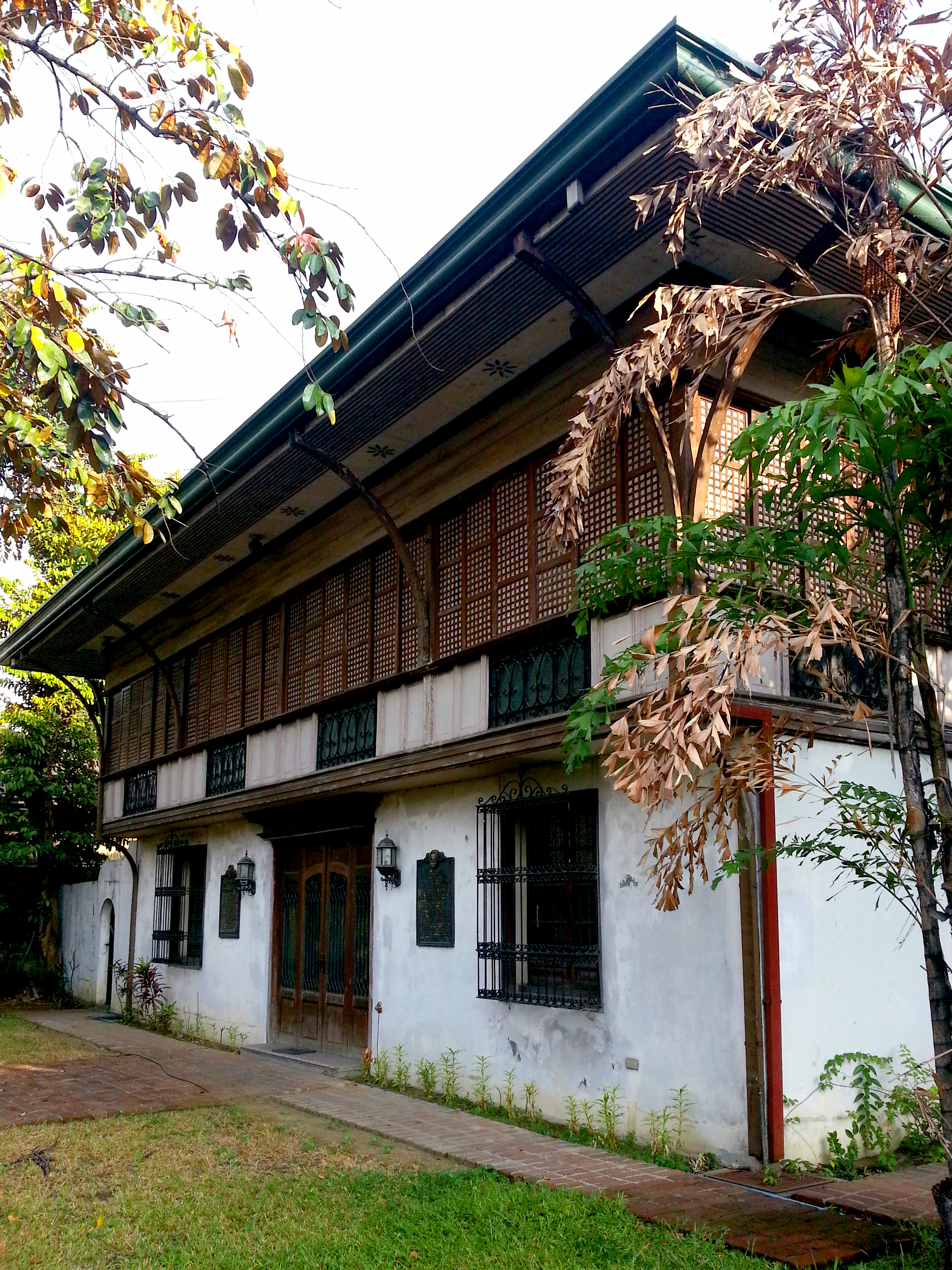
Jose P. Laurel House in Paco, Manila

The Jose P. Laurel Ancestral House (Filipino: Tahanan ni Jose P. Laurel) is a historic house in Manila, Philippines. It is one of the three houses owned by the President of the Second Philippine Republic, José P. Laurel. It is located in 1515 Peñafrancia Street (corner Santo Sepulcro Street) in Paco District (hence also known as Villa Peñafrancia). President Laurel purchased the house in 1926 and served as his residence, together with his wife Pacencia Hidalgo and their children, for 29 years before he transferred to his retirement home in Mandaluyong.

== Architecture ==
Originally built in 1861 during the Spanish Colonial Period in the Philippines, this residential structure reflects the architectural style common around that time known as Bahay-na-Bato ("House-of-Stone"). Masonry materials constitute the lower level or the ground floor of the house while wooden materials and capiz-shell windows dominate the upper floor. The roofing of the house is made of corrugated galvanized iron while its vented eave ceilings are decorated with simple cut-out floral design. Ornate grill works also adorn the windows in the ground floor and the ventanillas (small shuttered openings below the windows) of the upper floor. Adjoining the northwest portion of the house is the garage area with an azotea or rooftop.

== Declaration as a Historic Building ==
The house property was inherited by President Laurel's third son Sotero H. Laurel, which he donated to the Jose P. Laurel Memorial Foundation. Restoration efforts led by Sotero Laurel were made to bring back the former grandeur of the structure and to honor his father's dedicated service in the Philippines. In March 1998, the ancestral house was designated as a Historic Building (House Type) by the National Historical Commission of the Philippines in which a marker was placed at the front corner of the property (see List of historical markers in the Philippines).

== See also ==
- Jose P. Laurel Residence
