= Arsenio Laurel =

Filipino racing driver

- Born: Arsenio Hidalgo Laurel; December 14, 1931; Tanauan, Batangas, Philippine Islands
- Died: November 19, 1967 (aged 35); Portuguese Macau
- Resting place: Manila Memorial Park – Sucat, Paranaque, Philippines
- Other name: Dodjie
- Occupations: Race car driver, Lawyer, Businessman
- Spouse: Maria Paz Rufino
- Children: 5
- Parents: Jose P. Laurel (father); Pacencia Laurel (mother)
- Relatives: Laurel family
- Years active: 1950s–1967

Championship titles
- 1962, 1963: Macau Grand Prix

Arsenio "Dodjie" Hidalgo Laurel (December 14, 1931 – November 19, 1967) was a champion race car driver from the Philippines. He was the first two-time winner of the Macau Grand Prix, winning it consecutively in 1962 and 1963. He was killed in an accident at the 1967 Macau Grand Prix.

== Early life ==
Born on December 14, 1931, Laurel was a scion of a prominent political family in the Philippines. He was the youngest of nine children. His father was José P. Laurel, the President of the Philippines during the Japanese occupation, while several of his brothers would eventually serve the country as Vice President (Salvador "Doy" Laurel), House Speaker (José B. Laurel Jr.), senator (Sotero Laurel II) and ambassador (José S. Laurel III).

On March 22, 1945, at the age of 13, Laurel joined his family and officials such as former Speaker of the National Assembly Benigno Aquino Sr., former Minister of Education Camilo Osias and his wife, and General Mateo Capinpin in evacuating from Baguio and began a long and perilous overland journey to Tuguegarao, where a Japanese navy plane would fly the group to Japan via Formosa (now Taiwan) and Shanghai, China. On September 15, days after Japan formally surrendered to the United States, his father, his older brother Jose III, and Aquino Sr. were arrested by a group of Americans headed by a Colonel Turner for collaborating with Imperial Japan and were imprisoned in Japan. He later joined the rest of the Laurel family in flying back to Manila on November 2.

He obtained a Master's Degree in Law at Yale University.

== Racing career ==
Laurel was a pioneer in the development of Philippine motorsport. He was among the first champion racers in the early years of organized auto racing in the Philippines, driving his 1954 Studebaker on the oval of the Santa Ana Hippodrome in Makati, Rizal when the horses were not running. He also excelled in karting and drag racing, organizing the earliest drag races at an abandoned Nielson Airport runway which is now Paseo de Roxas in Makati. He was also a licensed helicopter pilot. In the mid-1960s, he was also known to TV viewers as the first host of Motoring News.

His success in the Asian racing scene in the 1960s earned him an invitation to race with a European team which he politely declined.

== Other ventures ==
Aside from being a race car driver, Laurel was also a corporate and taxation lawyer, owner of several business firms, president of the Cam Wreckers Association and the founder and owner of the country’s pioneering Batangas Racing and Karting Circuit. He likewise organized the pioneer “Concourse d’ Elegance” Auto Show. He was also a silent election worker as he had successfully campaigned for his brother Doy's Senate bid in 1967.

== Death ==
Laurel died during the Macau Grand Prix on November 19, 1967, at the age of 35. Eyewitness accounts revealed that Laurel, after his Lotus 41 skidded out of control, tried to avoid hitting some spectators by driving the car into the sea wall of Guia Circuit. The crash caused his car to burst into flames, leaving him trapped inside and was burned badly and died before marshals arrived to take him to the hospital. He was the first fatality of the Macau Grand Prix.

Sporting positions
| Preceded by Peter Heath | Macau Grand Prix; Winner; 1962, 1963 | Succeeded by Albert Poon |
