= Cocoy Laurel =

Filipino singer (1953–2025)

- Born: Victor Diaz Laurel; March 2, 1953; Philippines
- Died: June 14, 2025 (aged 72)
- Occupations: Actor; singer
- Years active: 1967–20?? (Note: Last public appearance was during the wake of Nora Aunor in April 2025. No information is available for the most recent date of activity in an acting or singing capacity)
- Known for: Love team with Nora Aunor, Role as the Engineer in Miss Saigon
- Parents: Salvador Laurel (father); Celia Diaz (mother)
- Relatives: Laurel family
- Musical career
- Instruments: Piano, vocals

Victor "Cocoy" Diaz Laurel (March 2, 1953 – June 14, 2025) was a Filipino singer and actor.

== Early life and education ==
Victor Diaz Laurel was born in the Philippines on March 2, 1953, to lawyer Salvador Laurel (who later became Vice President) and theater actress Celia Diaz. He was the eldest son among eight children, with older sisters and younger siblings. He studied at the La Salle Green Hills for his elementary and high school studies. Laurel was reportedly shy and was bullied by older youth.

At 19 years old, he moved to Madrid to study portrait painting at Academia Real de Bellas Artes. Laurel in between acting also studied at the American Academy of Dramatic Arts and music at Juilliard School in 1972; both in New York.

== Career ==
=== Early years and appearance in film ===
Laurel was first scouted via a 1967 Romeo and Juliet of the Philippines talent search contest in the Philippines organized by Paramount Pictures. He was selected as the Romeo for the talent search associated with Franco Zeffirelli's 1968 film Romeo and Juliet. He also sang the theme song of the film at Two for the Road of Elvira Manahan.

Laurel joined the Repertory Philippines, debuting in Plaza Suite (1968) which also starred his mother. He then acted in Doña Rosita La Soltera, Fiddler on the Roof and The Best of Broadway.

Laurel was known for being part of a love team with Nora Aunor. They debuted together in the film Lollipops and Roses (1971) before appearing in Impossible Dream (1973), and Lollipops and Roses at Buroong Talangka (1975). He also appeared in films such as Ophelia and Paris, Disco Fever, and Pinoy American Style. His last film was in 1982.

=== Theatre career ===
From the 1980s to 1990s, Laurel acted in musicals featuring in local adaptations of Broadway acts. This includes the West Side Story, The King and I and Les Misérables. He played as Jean Valjean in Repertory Philippines's Les Misérables.

In 1989, Laurel joined the Miss Saigon cast featuring Lea Salonga in London acting for two years. He played the role as the assistant commissar. After convincing by producer, Cameron Mackintosh he moved to Australia to fulfill the role of the Engineer of the same musical. He did at least 450 shows.

In December 1996, Laurel returned to the Philippines. He played the role of Jose Rizal for a reenactment of the historical figure's execution in Bagumbayan.

=== Music ===
The Lollipops and Roses film was followed by a concert entitled Cocoy Live at the Meralco Theater with Ryan Cayabyab as musical director. Laurel won a FAMAS Award for the musical score of the film Uliran in 1972.

He released at least four albums. This includes the Spanish-language album "Te Quiero" published in January 2000 was written by Laurel. Laurel featured in live concert at the Music Museum with Ryan Cayabyab as the music director. He preferred to play the piano due to the instrument giving a semblance of an orchestra. He was still performing concerts as of 2011.

== Illness and death ==
Laurel sustained a spinal injury at the 2005 musical The Miraculous Virgin of Caysasay, which was later attributed by his brother David to be the start of the decline of his health until his death. He also had a major ulcer operation in 2007. He spent his later years singing for the choir of the Santuario de San Antonio in Makati.

Laurel's last public appearance was at the wake of Aunor in April 2025. He died on June 14, 2025, due to a cardiac arrest arising from multiple organ failure. He was 72.

== Filmography ==
Year	Title	Role	Notes
1971	Lollipops and Roses		
1973	Impossible Dream		
1974	Oh Margie Oh	Victor	
1975	Lollipops and Roses at Buroong Talangka		

== Accolades ==
Year	Group	Category	Work	Result
1972	FAMAS Awards	Best Theme Song	Ang Uliran	Won
