= Jose Laurel III =

Filipino diplomat

The Honorable Jose Laurel III KGCR
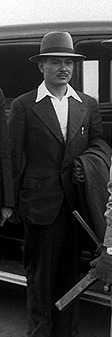
- Laurel III in 1945

Ambassador of the Philippines to Japan
- In office 1966–1971
- President: Ferdinand Marcos
- Preceded by: Jacinto C. Borja
- Succeeded by: Roberto S. Benedicto

Personal details
- Born: José Sotero Hidalgo Laurel III; August 27, 1914
- Died: January 6, 2003 (aged 88)
- Spouse: Beatríz Castillo
- Children: 8
- Parents: José P. Laurel (father); Pacencia Laurel (mother)
- Relatives: Laurel family
- Profession: Diplomat, Lawyer

Jose Sotero Hidalgo Laurel III KGCR (August 27, 1914 – January 6, 2003) was a Filipino diplomat and the aide-de-camp of his father, Jose P. Laurel, when he was president of the collaborationist Second Philippine Republic. He later became ambassador of the Philippines to Japan.

== Early life ==
Laurel was born on August 27, 1914. He mastered the Japanese language and culture in the Imperial Japanese Army Academy from 1934 to 1937. He served as a junior aide-de-camp to President Manuel L. Quezon from 1937-1940.

== Arrest during the Japanese occupation ==
Beginning in March 1945, Laurel, together with his family, Camilo Osías, Benigno Aquino Sr., Gen. Tomas Capinpin, and Jorge B. Vargas evacuated to Baguio. Shortly after the city fell, they traveled to Tuguegarao, where they embarked a bomber plane to Japan via Formosa (now Taiwan) and Shanghai, China. Alongside his father and Aquino, he was taken into U.S. custody on September 15, 1945, days after the Japanese forces formally surrendered to the United States. They were imprisoned in Yokohama until they were transferred to Sugamo Prison on November 16. On July 23, 1946, they left Tokyo for Manila, having been turned over to the Republic of the Philippines.

== Career ==
Laurel was admitted to the Philippine bar on June 10, 1950.

From 1966 to 1971, Laurel served as ambassador of the Philippines to Japan.

In 1976, Laurel initiated the Philippine Federation of Japan Alumni (PHILFEJA), a congregation of former students who graduated in Japanese colleges and universities including grantees of training programs. The association aims to strengthen Philippine-Japan relationship through educational and professional exchanges. He was also active in the Laurel Law Office up to his later years.

== Death ==
Laurel died on January 6, 2003, at the age of 88. His remains were cremated.

== Personal life ==
Laurel is the second of nine siblings. He is the son of former President Jose P. Laurel with his wife Pacencia Laurel and brother to Jose Jr., Sotero, Salvador, and Arsenio Laurel. He was married to Beatriz Castillo with eight children, including Jose Laurel V (former Governor of Batangas and former ambassador of the Philippines to Japan) and Ma. Elena Laurel-Loinaz (former president of the Philippine-Japan Ladies Association). He also had 23 grandchildren.

== Awards ==
The Philippines:

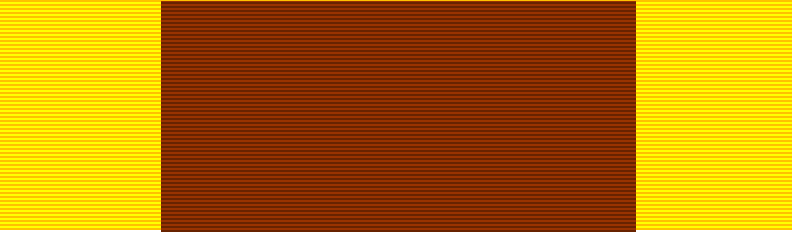
- Supreme Commander and Knight of the Order of the Knights of Rizal.
- Grand Cross of the Order of Sikatuna, Rank of ‘Datu’ (1987).

Diplomatic posts
Preceded by Jacinto C. Borja	Ambassador of the Philippines to Japan; 1966–1971	Succeeded by Roberto S. Benedicto
