= Salvador Laurel =

Vice President of the Philippines from 1986 to 1992

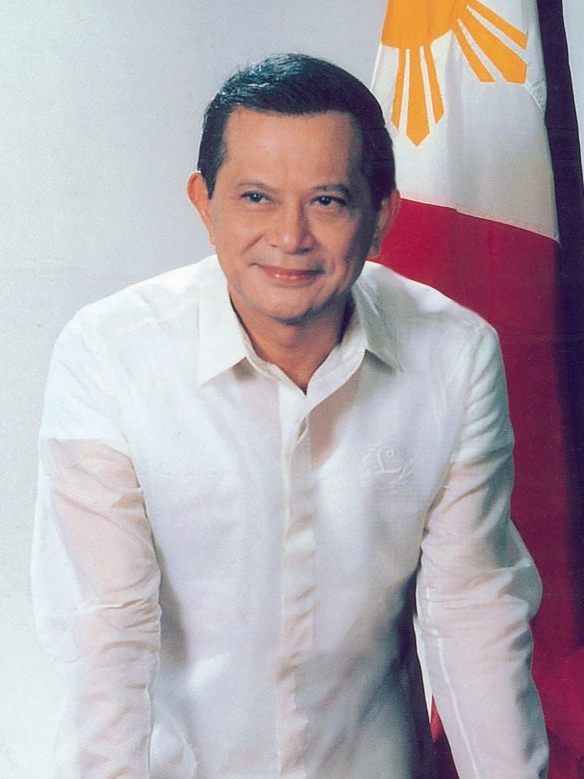
- Official portrait, 1986

8th Vice President of the Philippines
- In office February 25, 1986 – June 30, 1992
- President: Corazon Aquino
- Preceded by: Re-established; Title last held by Fernando Lopez
- Succeeded by: Joseph Estrada

5th Prime Minister of the Philippines
- In office February 25, 1986 – March 25, 1986
- President: Corazon Aquino
- Preceded by: Cesar Virata
- Succeeded by: Position abolished

16th Secretary of Foreign Affairs
- In office March 25, 1986 – February 2, 1987
- President: Corazon Aquino
- Preceded by: Pacifico A. Castro (Acting)
- Succeeded by: Manuel Yan

Member of the Interim Batasang Pambansa
- In office June 12, 1978 – September 16, 1983
- Constituency: Region IV-A

Senator of the Philippines
- In office December 30, 1967 – September 23, 1972

7th President of the Nacionalista Party
- In office 1986–2003
- Preceded by: Jose Roy
- Succeeded by: Manny Villar

Personal details
- Born: Salvador Roman Hidalgo Laurel; November 18, 1928 Paco, Manila, Philippine Islands
- Died: January 27, 2004 (aged 75) Atherton, California, U.S.
- Resting place: Libingan ng mga Bayani
- Party: Nacionalista (1967–2004)
- Other political affiliations: UNIDO (1980–1988); KBL (1978–1979)
- Spouse: Celia Díaz (m. 1950)
- Children: 8 (including Cocoy)
- Parents: Jose P. Laurel; Pacencia Hidalgo
- Relatives: Laurel family
- Nickname: Doy

Salvador Roman "Doy" Hidalgo Laurel KGCR (Tagalog pronunciation: [laʊˈɾɛl], November 18, 1928 – January 27, 2004) was a Filipino lawyer and politician who served as the Vice President of the Philippines from 1986 to 1992 under President Corazon Aquino and briefly served as the last Prime Minister from February 25 to March 25, 1986, when the position was abolished. He was a major leader of the United Nationalist Democratic Organization (UNIDO), the political party that helped topple the regime of President Ferdinand Marcos with the 1986 People Power Revolution.

== Early life ==
Salvador Laurel was the fifth son and eighth child of José P. Laurel, who served as president during the Second Philippine Republic. Salvador was born into a family with a long lineage of public servants spanning several generations. His grandfather, Sotero Remoquillo Laurel, was a delegate to the Malolos Congress in 1899 and interior secretary in the first Philippine revolutionary government under President Emilio Aguinaldo.

Laurel first enrolled at Centro Escolar de Señoritas, where he studied from 1933 to 1935. Laurel's father wanted Laurel to experience a public school education and enrolled him first in the Paco Elementary School (1935–36) and then the Justo Lukban Elementary School (1936–37). He finished elementary schooling at Ateneo de Manila Grade School in 1941. Laurel received second honors in his first year of high school, with a general average of 93.4. Barely three months later, his studies came to an abrupt halt with the outbreak of the war in the Pacific Theater on December 8, 1941. The Japanese government temporarily closed the American Jesuits run school, which prompted Laurel to enroll at De La Salle College High School, where he graduated in 1946.

Laurel was a member of Upsilon Sigma Phi during his university studies.

=== Stay in Japan ===
Towards the end of the war, the Japanese Supreme War Council issued an order to have Philippine government officials flown to Japan. President Laurel volunteered to go alone to spare his Cabinet members the ordeal of being separated from their families. His wife, Paciencia, and seven of his children went with him. The officials who accompanied him were former Speaker of the National Assembly Benigno Aquino Sr., former Minister of Education Camilo Osias and his wife, and General Mateo Capinpin. On March 22, 1945, the group evacuated from Baguio. It began a long and perilous overland journey to Tuguegarao, where a Japanese navy plane would fly the group to Japan via Formosa (now Taiwan) and Shanghai, China. The odyssey ended in Nara, where they were confined until November 10, 1945.

On September 15, 1945, his father, Jose P. Laurel, his older brother Jose Laurel III, and Benigno Aquino Sr. were arrested by a group of Americans headed by Colonel Turner and were taken to Yokohama prison. The Laurel family, except for the former president and Jose III, was flown to Manila two months later, on November 2, 1945.

=== Return to Manila ===
Christmas 1945 was the bleakest one for the Laurel family; their Peñafrancia home was looted and emptied of its furniture, while the former president was placed in solitary confinement in Sugamo Prison in Japan. Salvador gifted his father a book entitled The World in 2030 A.D. by the Earl of Birkenhead. Lacked in writing instruments, he used that book to write his Memoirs. He also wrote the poem To My Beloved Father to lift up his father's spirits, and sent it to him as a Christmas present.

To My Beloved Father

Trudge on, noble leader
And with thy dauntless
Courage
Swerve not in thy glorious, tho'
thankless path,
And heed not their threats
and wrath;
Forgive them who are nescient
And
With their perennial
Discontent
Thy goals impend;
Assuage thy bitter struggle
and with thy
Sapient calm, O Sage!
The glorious and the great
Have always been exalted late
And in the midst of great
work condemned.

— Salvador Laurel

At La Salle, he joined a group of young men who planned to go by sea to the Dutch East Indies (Indonesia since 1949) and join Sukarno in the struggle for independence from the Dutch Empire, but local authorities stopped them at the pier. He completed his secondary education at La Salle in March 1946.

His father, Jose P. Laurel, and brother, Jose III, would finally return to the Philippines on July 23, 1946.

Although all his older brothers were lawyers, he enrolled at the University of the Philippines as a pre-medicine student, where he obtained his AA (pre-medicine) and was admitted to medicine proper, shifting to law two years later. He was admitted to the law school while working to complete his (AA Pre-Law). He received his LLB (Bachelor of Laws) degree in UP in March 1952. He was a member of the Student Editorial Board of the Philippine Law Journal.

He was acclaimed the University Champion Orator after he won the first prize in three consecutive inter-university oratorical contests: the 1949 Inter-University Oratorical contest sponsored by the Civil Liberties Union, the Student Councils Association of the Philippines, and the Inter-University Symposium on the Japanese Peace Treaty in 1951.

Without waiting for the bar examination results, he left for Connecticut to study at Yale University, his father's alma mater, where he earned his Master of Laws degree in 1952. He earned the title Doctor of Juridical Science at Yale University in 1960.

Of his studies and scholastic endeavors at Yale University, Myres S. McDougal, a Sterling Professor of Law, Emeritus of the Yale Law School, wrote:

Salvador H. Laurel was a superb scholar at Yale. Like his father in an earlier day, he came to us in the vital formative years of his intellectual development, and remained to earn his master of laws degree (LLM) and doctorate in juridical science (J.S.D.) with highest standing. I have taught so many brilliant students from other countries at Yale Law School. Doy was one of the very best and has always been one of my favorites. His papers and comments were always informed, perceptive, wise, creative and deeply dedicated to the public and common interest. His deepest loyalty and devotion is to his own country, but he is aware of a larger interdependent world.

== Personal life ==
Laurel later married Celia Díaz (May 29, 1928 - July 12, 2021) in 1950, a society debutante. He was the father of Cocoy Laurel, movie and stage actor, and grandfather of actress Denise Laurel. He fathered actress Pia Pilapil, through veteran actress Pilar Pilapil.

== Legal career ==
In Manila, Laurel joined his brothers at the Laurel Law Offices in Intramuros, where he began his career as a barrister with a strong commitment to legal aid. Troubled by the discovery that 94% of cases filed by indigent individuals in the fiscal office were dismissed due to lack of counsel, he founded the Citizen's Legal Aid Society of the Philippines (CLASP) in 1967. Laurel actively campaigned nationwide, rallying lawyers to join his mission to provide justice for people experiencing poverty. By the end of its first year, CLASP had enlisted 750 lawyers.

For his advocacy and dedication as the "Defender of the Defenseless," Laurel was recognized as "Lawyer of the Year 1967" by the Justice and Court Reporters Association (JUCRA). In 1976, his efforts gained international acclaim when the International Bar Association awarded him the "Most Outstanding Legal Aid Lawyer of the World" in Stockholm. Reflecting on the honor, Laurel recalled his surprise and pride at being recognized for his work with CLASP, advocacy for justice-of-the-poor laws, and steadfast commitment to human rights during the martial law era.

In addition to his legal practice, Laurel was a distinguished legal scholar and professor at Lyceum University. He edited the Proceedings of the Philippine Constitutional Convention (1934–1935), meticulously reproducing records kept by his father, Dr. José P. Laurel, a delegate to the Convention. This monumental work, spanning seven volumes, was published in 1966.

== Political career ==
=== Senator ===
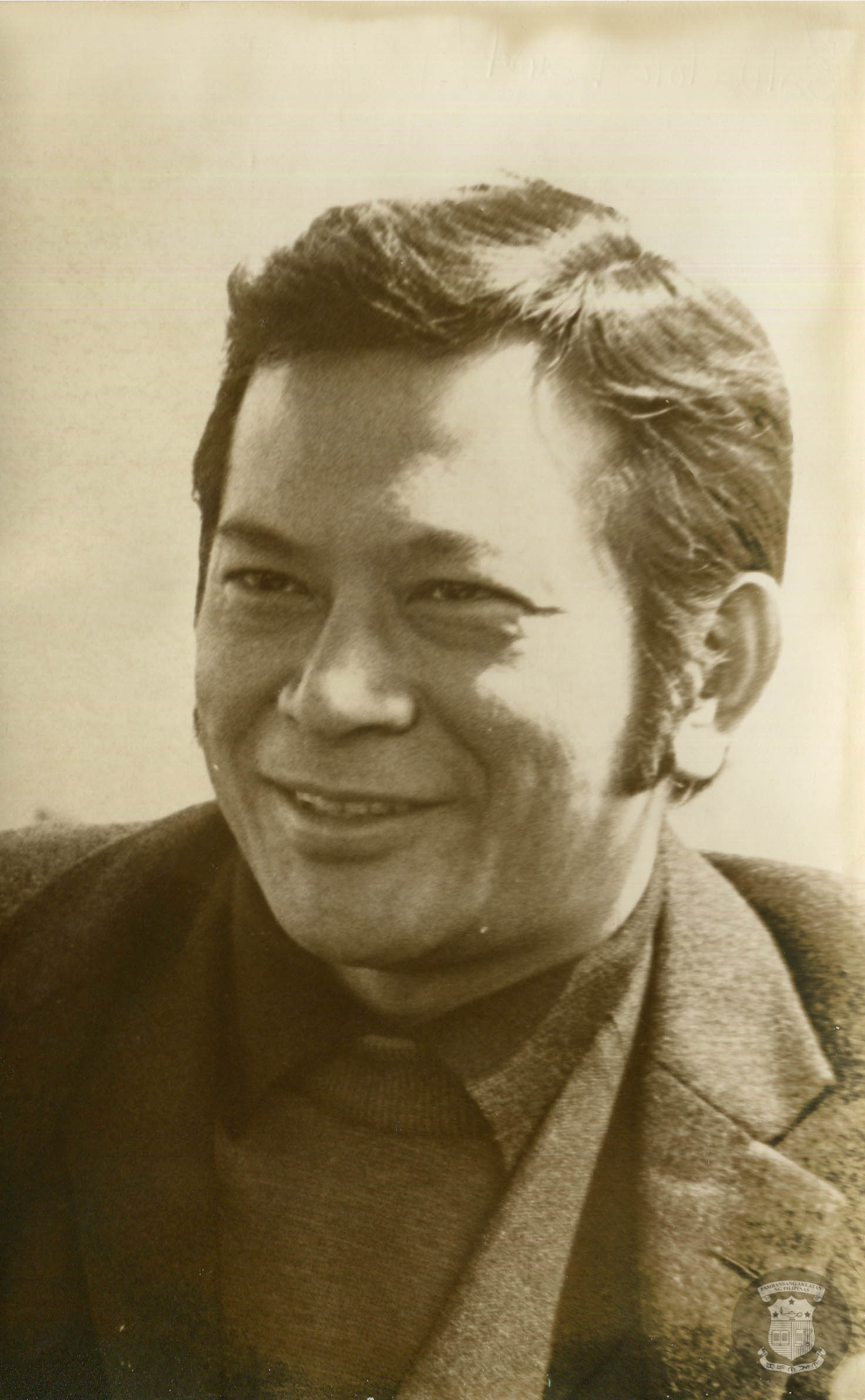
Laurel during his tenure as senator

It was not until 1967 that Salvador H. Laurel seriously entered politics, running for the Senate under the Nacionalista Party with the assistance of his youngest brother Dodjie, a lawyer and professional racing driver. During his campaign, he was injured in a car accident while returning to the Magellan International Hotel in Cebu City in the early hours of September 24, 1967. Due to his injuries, Laurel underwent a surgical operation in Manila, with his wife Celia briefly campaigning on his behalf during his recovery. Upon returning to his senatorial campaign, Laurel attempted to be energetic in his demeanor in order to offset his injured image with a cast. Laurel ultimately won a Senate seat in the sixth Congress, and officially took his oath of office as senator on December 30, 1967. At 39 years old, Laurel became the youngest Nacionalista senator in post-war history – a record that would be held for the next 40 years.

On November 19, 1967, five days after the Senate election and a day after Laurel held a celebration for both his electoral victory and his birthday, Laurel was informed by his brother Mariano during a conference that Dodjie had died in a racing accident at the 1967 Macau Grand Prix. Despite the advise of his eldest brother Pepito, Salvador and Mariano left for Hong Kong with their nephew Joey at 4 p.m. that day, and took a ferry boat to Macau to retrieve Dodjie's body at a funeral parlor.

In the Senate, he authored five "justice for the poor laws" also known as "Laurel laws."

1. R.A. 6033, requiring courts to give priority to cases involving poor litigants;

2. R.A. 6034, giving free meals, travel and lodging allowances to poor litigants and their witnesses;

3. R.A. 6035, providing free transcript of stenographic notes to poor litigants;

4. R.A. 6036, dispensing with bail in minor cases; and

5. R.A. 6127, crediting prisoners with the full period (only one-half under previous law) of their detention in the service of prison terms

Laurel also authored nine judicial reform laws from 1968 to 1970; the Government Reorganization Act; and amendments to the Land Reform Code, one of which created the Department of Agrarian Reform.

As chairman of the Senate Committee on Justice, Laurel reported on the Administration of Justice in Central Luzon (1969); the State of the Philippine Penal Institution and Penology (1969); the Criminal Jurisdiction Provisions of the RP-US Military Bases Agreement (1969); the Dissident Problem in Central Luzon (1971); and Violations of Civil Liberties in the case of the "Golden Buddha" (1971).

Laurel helped represent the country in numerous international assemblies. He was sent to the United Nations General Assembly thrice and to the Inter-Parliamentary Union Conference in Lima, Peru 1968. Later, when he was elected member of the interim National Assembly in 1978, Laurel was designated head of the Philippine delegation to the First General Assembly of the ASEAN Inter-Parliamentary Organization in Singapore.

In 1972, Senator Laurel was the first high-ranking Filipino government official to visit the People's Republic of China (PRC). He was met by Premier Zhou Enlai, Vice Premier (later President) Li Xiannian, and other high officials of the Chinese government. Upon his return, he submitted an extensive report to the Senate on his China visit. He strongly advocated for the resumption of friendly ties with the PRC and the adoption of the One-China Policy, which eventually became the official stand of the Philippines.

Laurel was voted the "Most Outstanding Senator" from 1968 to 1971.

Freedom fighter

During martial law, Laurel engaged in fiery speeches that exhorted the people not to be afraid and to join him in the fight to restore democracy.

Through his leadership, he succeeded in organizing the United Nationalist Democratic Organization (UNIDO), drawing within its ambit leaders such as Cesar Climaco, Soc Rodrigo, Gerardo Roxas, Dominador Aytona, Eva Estrada Kalaw, Rene Espina, Mamintal Tamano, Domocao Alonto and his nephew Abul Khayr, Raul Gonzalez, Homobono Adaza and Abe Sarmiento and all significant political parties who were opposed to the dictatorship. The UNIDO was the political party that ended the dictatorship.

The UNIDO national convention

Laurel was unanimously endorsed by his party, the UNIDO. During the UNIDO national convention at the Araneta Coliseum on June 12, 1985, nearly 25,000 delegates attended and proclaimed him the party standard-bearer in the snap election against President Ferdinand E. Marcos. Corazon Aquino, widow of Ninoy Aquino, spoke before the vast assembly endorsing Laurel's candidacy. Five months later, however, she declared her candidacy, causing a major crisis in the opposition – a rift that could cause its downfall and ensure a Marcos victory.

A series of meetings were arranged between the two opposition candidates to iron out their differences, but the impasse could not be broken up to the third meeting. Cory, backed by the Convenors group, was determined to run for president. Finally, Laurel said he would agree to run as her vice president provided she ran under the UNIDO banner, but Cory refused. Laurel immediately filed his certificate of candidacy as president at the Commission on Elections.

In the same year, writer Nick Joaquin published his biography of Laurel titled Doy Laurel in Profile: A Philippine Political Odyssey.

1986 snap elections

Cory Aquino sent Lupita Kashiwahara to inform Laurel of her decision to run under UNIDO. Laurel withdrew his presidential candidacy to allow Aquino to run as the unified opposition candidate in the snap elections.

The Cory–Doy campaign vigorously began, and on February 25, 1986, they took their oaths, respectively, as president and vice president of the Philippines at the Club Filipino.

=== Vice presidency and premiership ===
Vice Presidential styles of Salvador Laurel
- Reference style: His Excellency; The Honourable
- Spoken style: Your Excellency
- Alternative style: Mr. Vice President

For a month following the People Power Revolution in late February 1986, Laurel became the only person in Philippine history to hold the posts of vice president, prime minister, and foreign minister concurrently. The office of prime minister was abolished, along with other institutions of the 1973 Constitution, with the issuance of the provisional Freedom Constitution on March 25, 1986.

==== Secretary of foreign affairs ====
As secretary of foreign affairs from February 1986 to September 1987, Vice President Laurel represented the Philippines in various international conferences attended by the heads of state. His official visit to China in 1986 was hailed as the "milestone marking the re-orientation of Philippine foreign policy".

For his services, Laurel received on June 21, 1996, the Gawad Mabini Award, with the highest rank of taking kampong; he was awarded the grand cross of the Order of Isabella the Catholic by King Juan Carlos I of Spain in 1986; and awarded the grand cross of the Order of Liberty and Unity from the Association for the Unity of Latin America in 1993 in New York.

He resigned from the Cabinet as secretary of foreign affairs on September 8, 1987, citing "fundamental differences on moral principles" with President Corazon Aquino. Manuel Yan succeeded him in February 1987.

=== 1992 presidential elections ===
In 1992, Laurel ran for president (under the banner of the Nacionalista Party) and lost in a field of seven contenders. This was his first and only electoral defeat since 1967.

== Post-vice presidency (1992–2004) ==
In 1993, Laurel was appointed by President Ramos to be chairman of the National Centennial Commission in the run-up to the Philippine Centennial celebrations of the country's independence on June 12, 1898.

Laurel was supposed to resign after the centennial celebrations, but President Joseph Estrada extended his term and abolished the commission only in 1999. A few months later, Laurel was charged with graft before the Sandiganbayan (political antigraft court) for misappropriating funds to construct the controversial ₱1.165-billion Centennial Expo in the Clark Freeport Zone in Angeles City. Laurel vehemently denied the allegation and stood as his defense counsel.

The charges, however, were eventually proved groundless in court.

=== Later life and death ===
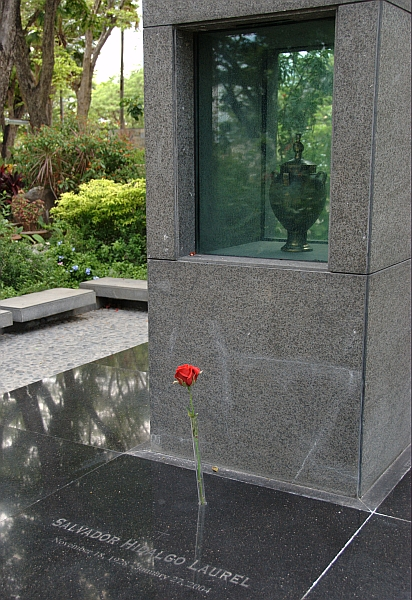
Laurel's cremains are interred at the Libingan ng mga Bayani.

Following his retirement from public service in 1999, Laurel devoted much of his time to law practice, international consultancy, free legal aid, and writing books. He also busied himself with the Nacionalista Party, of which he was president.

In June 2003, Laurel flew to the United States to seek medical intervention after he was diagnosed with cancer of the lymph nodes. He died on January 27, 2004, in his rented home in Atherton, California. He was 75 at the time of his death. His remains were cremated days afterward. On January 29, President Gloria Macapagal Arroyo issued Presidential Proclamation No. 544, declaring seven days of official mourning for Laurel. Laurel’s ashes were brought to his hometown of Tanauan, Batangas, on February 5 for a necrological service at St. John the Evangelist Church. His ashes were later brought to the Batangas Provincial Capitol in Batangas City for a memorial service. His ashes were interred at the Libingan ng mga Bayani in Taguig on February 6.

In addition, Arroyo awarded Laurel the grand cross of the Order of Lakandula posthumously on February 7, 2004. In 2005, his widow Celia Diaz-Laurel wrote and published the biography Doy Laurel, and by 2010, she published his manuscript written in 1999, After 100 Years, What Next?.

== Electoral history ==
Electoral history of Salvador Laurel
| Year | Office | Party | Votes received | | | | Result |
| Year | Office | Party | Total | % | P. | Swing | Result |
|---|---|---|---|---|---|---|---|
| 1967 | Senator of the Philippines | Nacionalista | 3,459,870 | 43.48% | 4th | —N/a | Won |
| 1978 | Mambabatas Pambansa (Assemblyman) from Region IV | KBL | 1,491,249 | 5.62% | 3rd | —N/a | Won |
| 1986 | Vice President of the Philippines | UNIDO | 7,648,570 | 50.07% | 1st | —N/a | Won |
| 1992 | President of the Philippines | Nacionalista | 770,046 | 3.40% | 7th | —N/a | Lost |

== Honors and awards ==
- :Grand Cross (Bayani) of the Order of Lakandula, February 7, 2004 (posthumous)
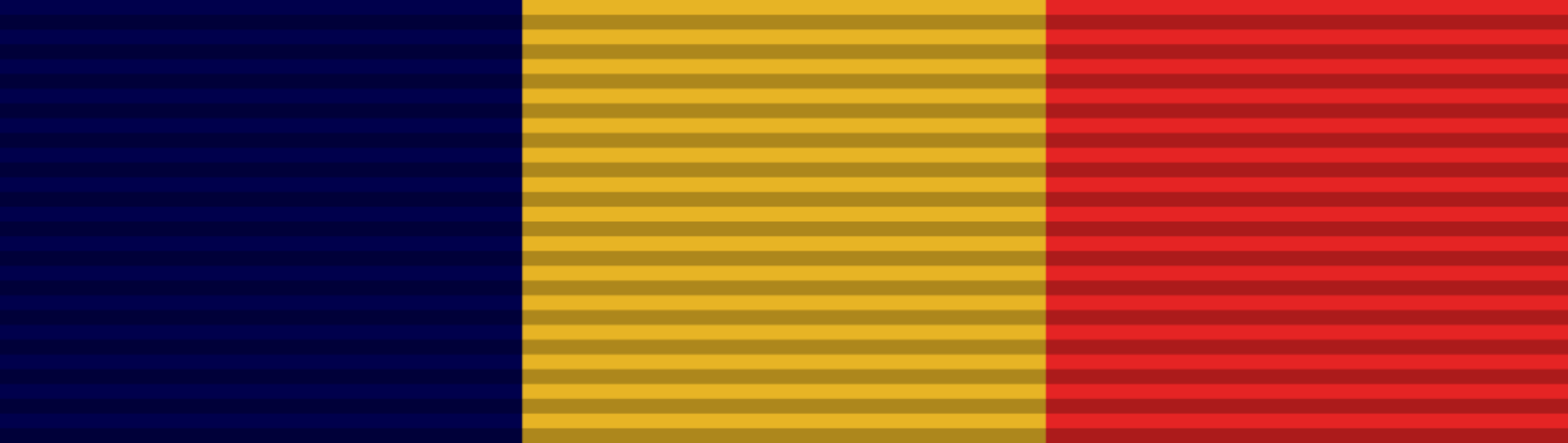
- : Grand Cross (Dakilang Kamanong) of the Gawad Mabini, 1996
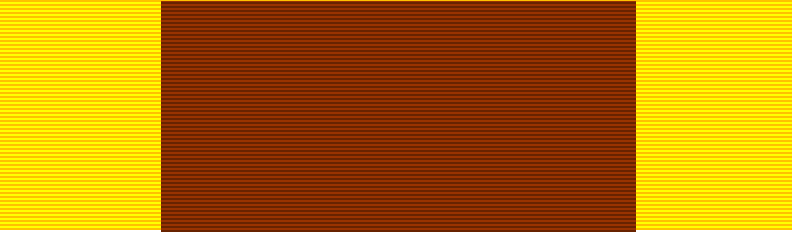
- : The Order of the Knights of Rizal, Knight Grand Cross of Rizal (KGCR).

== Books ==
- Laurel, Salvador H. (1992). Neither Trumpets nor Drums: Summing Up the Cory Government, PDM Press, Inc.
- Laurel, Salvador H. (2000). China Update 2000, S. H. Laurel.
- Laurel, Salvador H. (2002). Through Ordeal and Turmoil: His Ideas on Nationhood, PDM Press, Inc.
- Laurel, Salvador H. (2010). After 100 Years, What Next?, Celia Diaz-Laurel.

== Notes ==
Political offices
| Vacant Office abolished due to Martial Law Title last held by Fernando Lopez | Vice President of the Philippines; 1986–1992 | Succeeded by Joseph Estrada |
| Preceded by Cesar Virata | Prime Minister of the Philippines^{1} 1986 | Position abolished |
| Preceded by Pacifico A. Castro as Acting Minister of Foreign Affairs | Secretary of Foreign Affairs; 1986–1987 | Succeeded by Manuel Yan |
Party political offices
| First | UNIDO nominee for Vice President of the Philippines; 1986 | Last |
| Preceded by Jose Laurel Jr. | President of the Nacionalista Party; 1989–2003 | Succeeded by Manny Villar |
| Vacant Title last held by Alejo Santos | Nacionalista nominee for President of the Philippines; 1992 | Vacant Title next held by Manny Villar |
Notes and references
1. Position abolished March 25, 1986 (Proclamation No. 3, s. 1986. Official Gazette. March 25, 1986.)
