= Celia Díaz Laurel =

Filipina artist

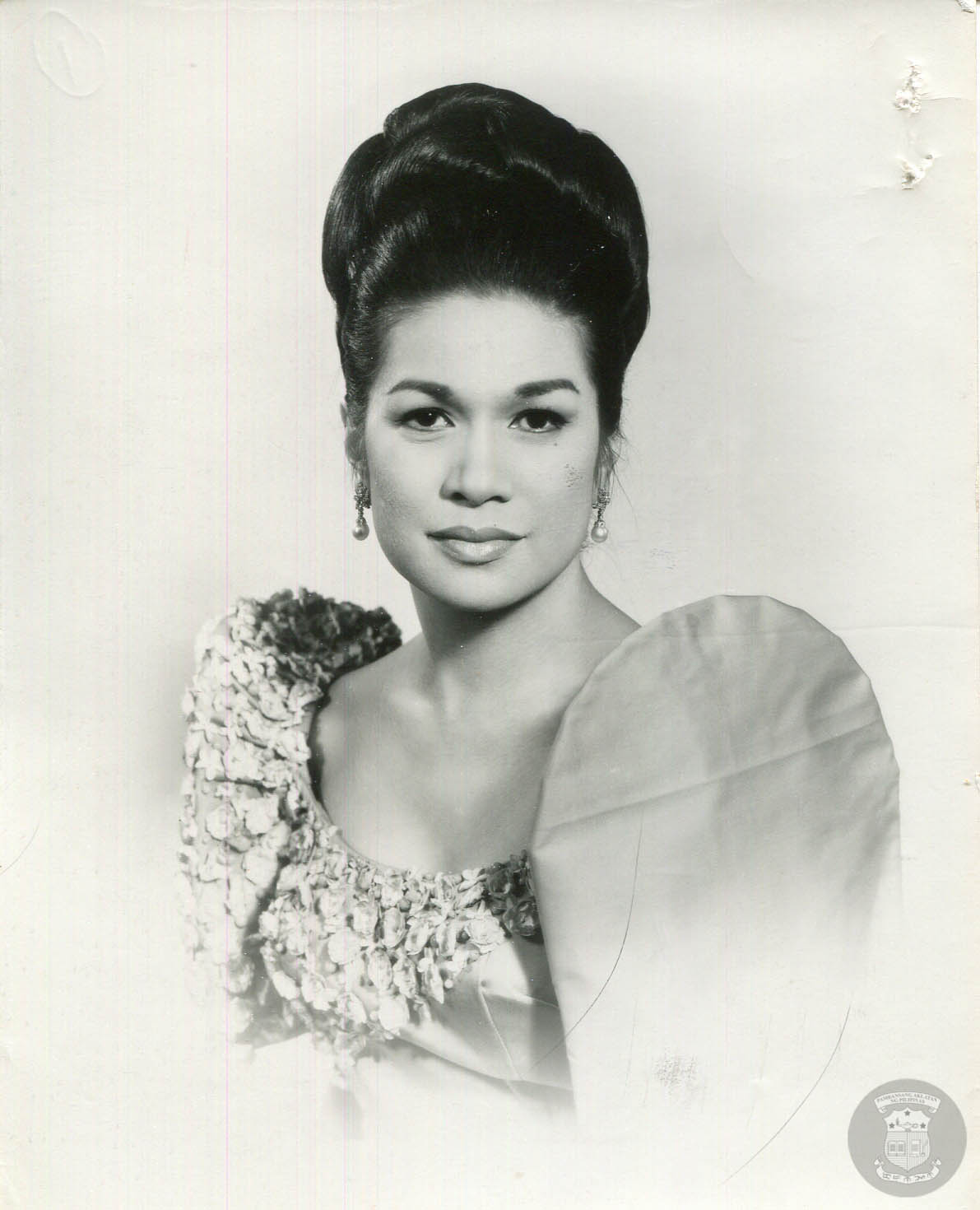
- Born: María Luz Celia Teresita Franco Díaz; May 29, 1928; Talisay, Negros Occidental, Philippine Islands
- Died: July 12, 2021 (aged 93); Metro Manila, Philippines
- Education: University of the Philippines (FA); Yale University (MFA)
- Occupations: theatre actress, singer and painter
- Spouse: Salvador Laurel (m. 1950; died 2004)
- Children: 8 (including Cocoy)
- Relatives: Denise Laurel (granddaughter)

María Luz Celia Teresita Franco Díaz-Laurel (May 29, 1928 – July 12, 2021) was a Filipina theatre actress, singer, and painter who served as the Second Lady of the Philippines from 1986 until 1992 as the wife of former Vice President Salvador Laurel. She was also the grandmother of actress Denise Laurel.

== Early life and career ==
Maria Luz Celia Teresita Franco Díaz was born on May 29, 1928, in Talisay, Negros Occidental to Anselmo Sison Diaz and Concepcion Gonzalez Franco. She was the youngest of six children. Her family moved to Manila when she was five. She studied at the Assumption Convent, where she was first exposed to stage performance.

She studied Fine Arts at the University of the Philippines where she was mentored by National Artists for Visual Arts Fernando Amorsolo and Guillermo Tolentino.

She then went on to pursue a Master in Fine Arts at Yale University, joining her husband Salvador “Doy” Laurel (who was later to become Vice-President of the Philippines) who was working on his master’s degree in Law at the same university at that time. Díaz-Laurel later detoured to the Yale School of Drama following an impressive interview conducted by a school official.

In April 1981, policemen in Manila filed a criminal case against Díaz-Laurel for breaching the peace after she participated in a noise barrage in the city on April 6. A month later, however, the charges against her and ten other participants were dismissed by President Marcos.

Celia has written several books (one dedicated to her husband Salvador, and the other to her grandfather Domingo Franco, one of 13 martyrs executed at Bagumbayan). She became an accomplished painter with a book chronicling her many works, a stage actress, and later in life, a production and costume set designer.

== Death ==
Celia died on July 12, 2021, due to complications from a stroke. She is survived by her children, Susana, Celine, Victor, David, Lorenzo, and Marissa, and 19 grandchildren. She was 93 years old.
