= Sotero Laurel =

Philippine politician (1918–2009)

The Honorable Sotero Laurel II
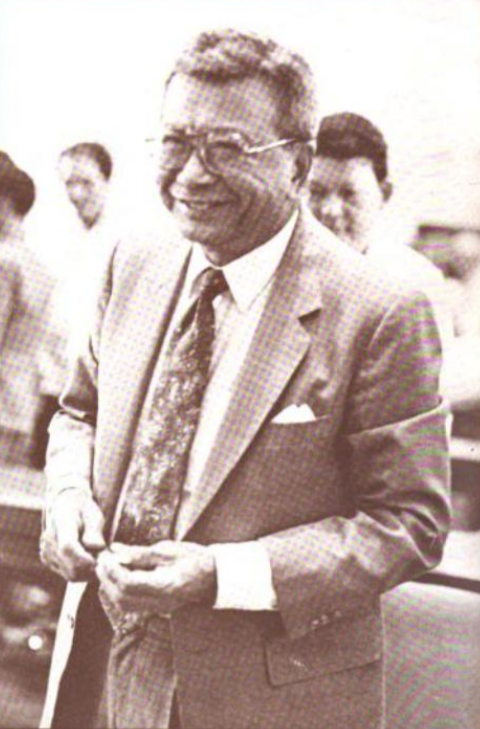
- Laurel as a senator, photograph released by the Philippine Congress, c. 1988

Senator of the Philippines
- In office June 30, 1987 – June 30, 1992

President pro tempore of the Senate of the Philippines
- In office July 23, 1990 – January 18, 1992
- President: Jovito Salonga
- Preceded by: Teofisto Guingona Jr.
- Succeeded by: Ernesto Maceda

Personal details
- Born: Sotero Cosme Hidalgo Laurel II; September 27, 1918 Tanauan, Batangas, Philippine Islands
- Died: September 16, 2009 (aged 90) Taguig, Philippines
- Resting place: Manila Memorial Park – Sucat
- Party: Nacionalista (1988–2009)
- Other political affiliations: UNIDO (1980–1988)
- Spouse: Lorna P. Laurel
- Children: 8
- Relatives: Laurel family
- Education: University of the Philippines Diliman (LL.B); University of Santo Tomas (LL.M); Harvard University; Georgetown University
- Occupation: Politician
- Profession: Educator
- Nickname: Teroy

Sotero Cosme "Teroy" Hidalgo Laurel II (September 27, 1918 – September 16, 2009) was a Filipino politician and educator who served as a Senator from 1987 until 1992, including a period as President pro tempore from 1990 until 1991. Laurel was the son of the former President of the Philippines José P. Laurel and the older brother of former Vice President Salvador Laurel.

== Early life and education ==
Laurel was the third oldest son of former President José P. Laurel, he was also the grandson of the late Sotero Remoquillo Laurel. He was born on September 27, 1918. He earned his law degree from the University of the Philippines College of Law and was a member of the Upsilon Sigma Phi fraternity. He later obtained a master's degree from the University of Santo Tomas. Laurel then went to the United States where he studied international and constitutional law at Harvard University and Georgetown University.

== Career ==
Laurel taught law at Lyceum of the Philippines, the Philippine Law School, and Far Eastern University. He also aligned himself from the school policies to found the "Student Varsitarian" in 1953, a reputable campus organization for students hails from different provinces. Laurel served as the president of the Philippine Association of Colleges and Universities (PACU) from 1963 to 1965. He also became the chairman of the Board of Trustees of the Lyceum of the Philippines University System. He was a 1986 recipient of the Ordre des Palmes Académiques of France, which is bestowed on educators and academics.

As Senator from 1987 to 1992, Laurel opposed the extension of the U.S. Naval Base Subic Bay and the Clark Air Base, leading to their closure in 1991. He was a member of the so-called "Magnificent 12" who voted against the extension. He was also the Chairman of the Senate Committee on Commerce and Industry and was the Senate President Pro-Tempore from 1990 to 1991. He was the oldest serving senator also at that time.

Laurel established Lyceum of the Philippines University–Batangas and Lyceum of the Philippines University-Laguna.

== Death ==
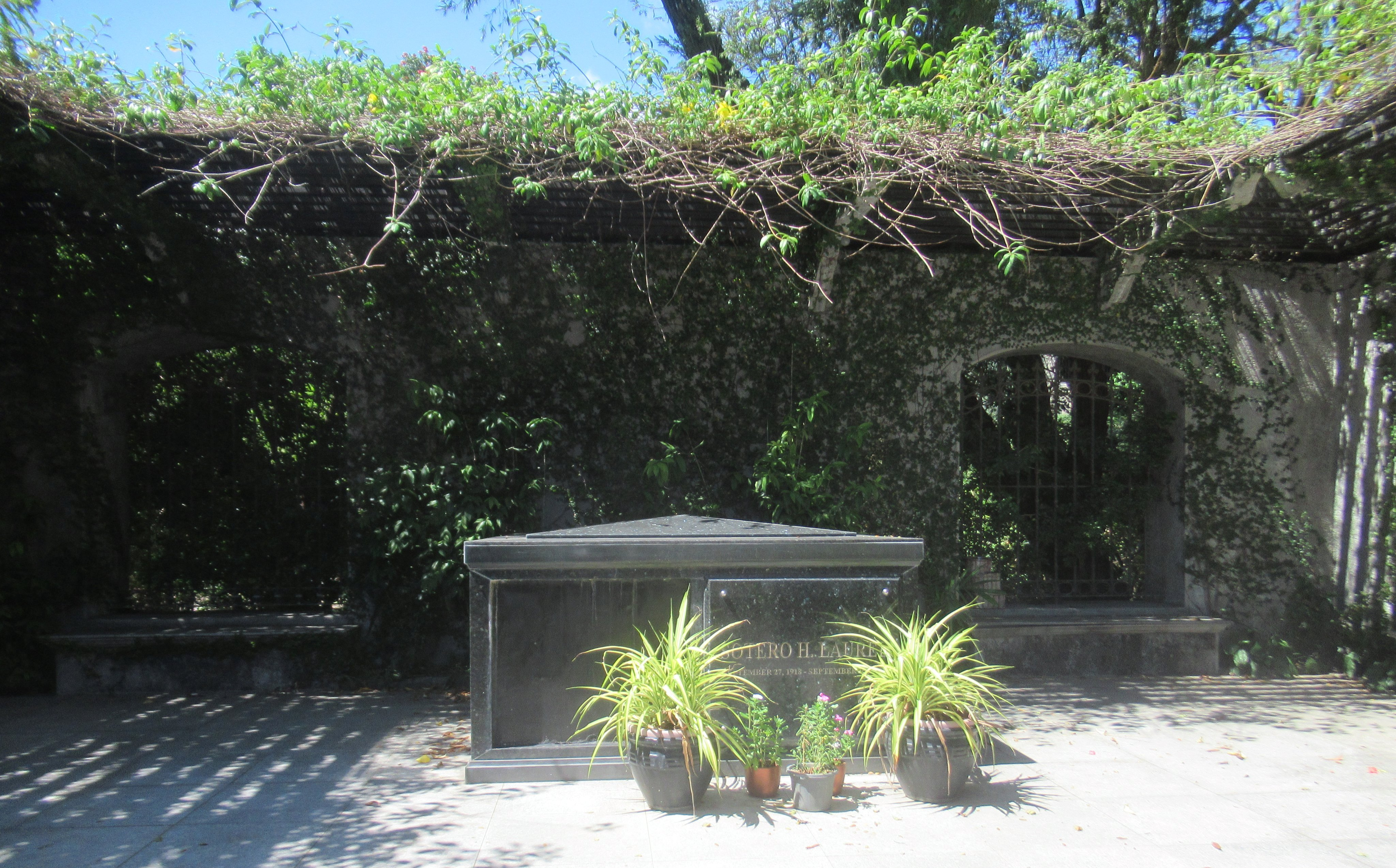
Laurel's grave at Manila Memorial Park – Sucat.

Sotero Laurel died of cancer on September 16, 2009, at the age of 90. He was survived by his wife Lorna, their eight children, and two sisters: Rose L. Avanceña and Nita L. Yupangco. Laurel was laid in state in Manila Memorial Park in Parañaque. Laurel was predeceased by his sister, Nene L. Guinto, and brothers former House Speaker José B. Laurel Jr.; former Vice President Salvador "Doy" Laurel; former Philippine Ambassador to Japan José S. Laurel III; banker, Mariano Laurel; and Arsenio "Dodjie" Laurel, a race car driver.
