= Pacencia Laurel =

First Lady of the Philippines from 1943 to 1945

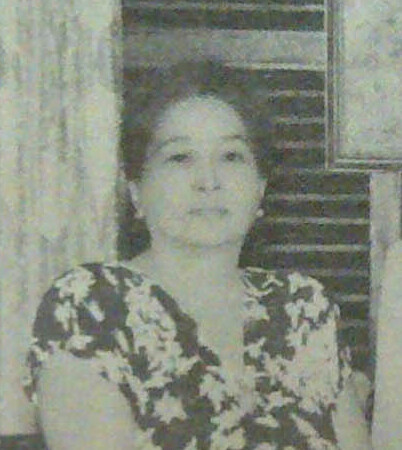

First Lady of the Philippines
- In role October 14, 1943 – August 17, 1945
- President: Jose P. Laurel
- Preceded by: Aurora Quezon
- Succeeded by: Esperanza Osmeña

Personal details
- Born: Pacencia Hidalgo y Valencia; April 30, 1889 Captaincy General of the Philippines
- Died: January 1, 1963 (aged 73) Tanauan, Batangas, Philippines
- Resting place: Tanauan City Public Cemetery, Tanauan, Batangas
- Spouse: Jose P. Laurel (m. 1911; died 1959)
- Children: 9 (including Jose Jr., Jose III, Sotero II, Salvador, and Arsenio)

Pacencia Hidalgo Laurel (born Pacencia Hidalgo y Valencia; April 30, 1889 – January 1, 1963) was the wife of Philippine President Jose P. Laurel and the third First Lady of the Philippines and the only First Lady to serve under the Japanese-occupied Philippines during World War II.

== Marriage and family ==
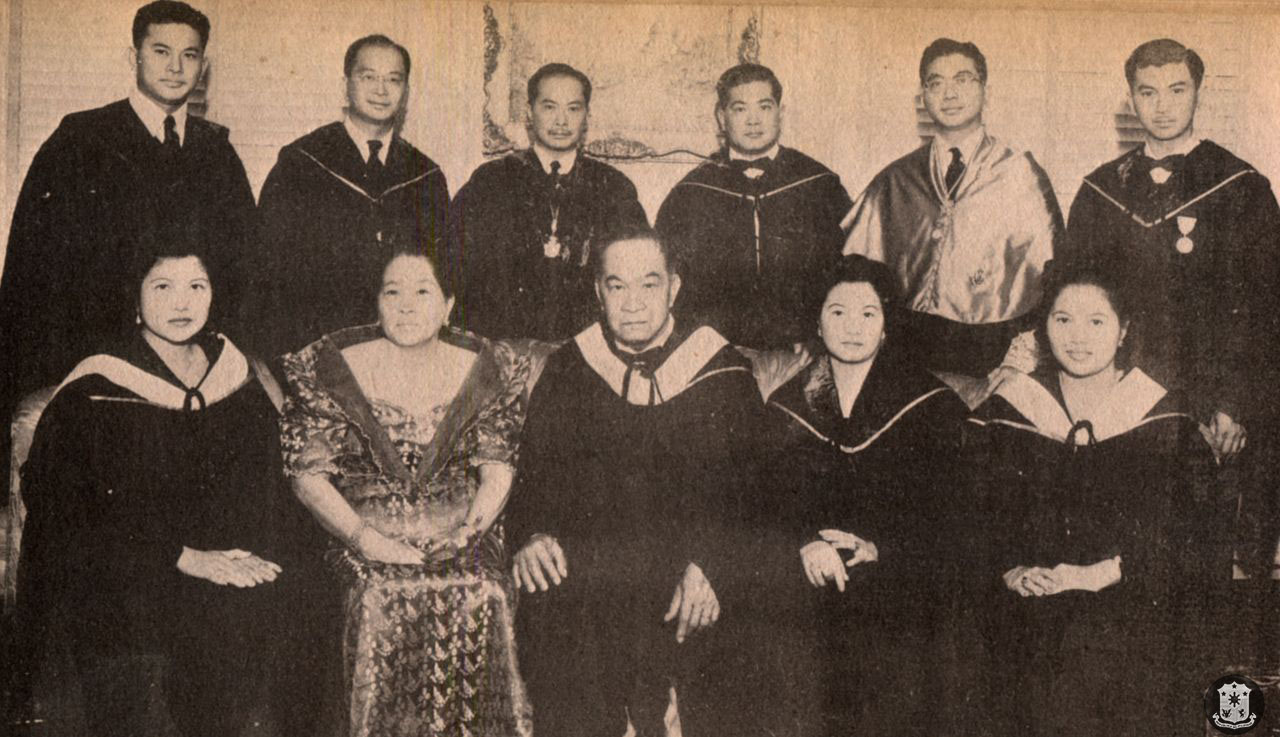
Laurel family

She eloped and married Jose P. Laurel, a fellow Tanauan native who was then a fresh high school graduate, on April 9, 1911. The couple had nine children:

- José Laurel Jr. (August 27, 1912 – March 11, 1998)
- José Laurel III (August 27, 1914 – January 6, 2003)
- Natividad Laurel-Guinto (born December 25, 1916, deceased)
- Sotero Laurel II (September 27, 1918 – September 16, 2009)
- Mariano Laurel (January 17, 1922 – August 2, 1979)
- Rosenda Laurel-Avanceña (born January 9, 1925, deceased)
- Potenciana Laurel-Yupangco (born May 19, 1926, deceased)
- Salvador Laurel (November 18, 1928 – January 27, 2004)
- Arsenio Laurel (December 14, 1931 – November 19, 1967)

Their marriage lasted until Laurel's death in 1959.

== First Lady ==
She held out both as first lady and mother to the nation during the dark days of the war. Laurel refused to live in Malacañang and opted for their family home in Paco, Manila. Like Mrs. Quezon, she involved herself in socio-civic and charitable activities. The best compliment paid her can be found in the dedication of her husband's book Bread and Freedom (1952) which states: "To my beloved and understanding wife, who shared uncomplainingly, all the hardships that are the lot of one who tries to serve the fatherland."

In March 1945, President Laurel, together with his family, Camilo Osías, Benigno Aquino Sr., Gen. Tomas Capinpin, and Jorge B. Vargas, evacuated to Baguio. Shortly after the city fell, they traveled to Tuguegarao, where they embarked a bomber plane to Japan via Formosa (now Taiwan) and Shanghai, China. Her husband, while in Japan, issued an Executive Proclamation on August 17, 1945 that declared the dissolution of the Second Philippine Republic.

Her husband, son Jose III, and Aquino were subsequently incarcerated in Japan for collaboration with Imperial Japan, starting on September 15, 1945, and they remained there until July 23, 1946. Mrs. Laurel and her other children were then brought back home to Manila on November 2, 1945.

Honorary titles
Preceded by Aurora Quezon	First Lady of the Philippines; 1943–1945	Succeeded by Esperanza Osmeña
