= Jose Laurel Jr. =

Filipino politician and lawyer (1912–1998)

The Honorable Jose Laurel Jr.
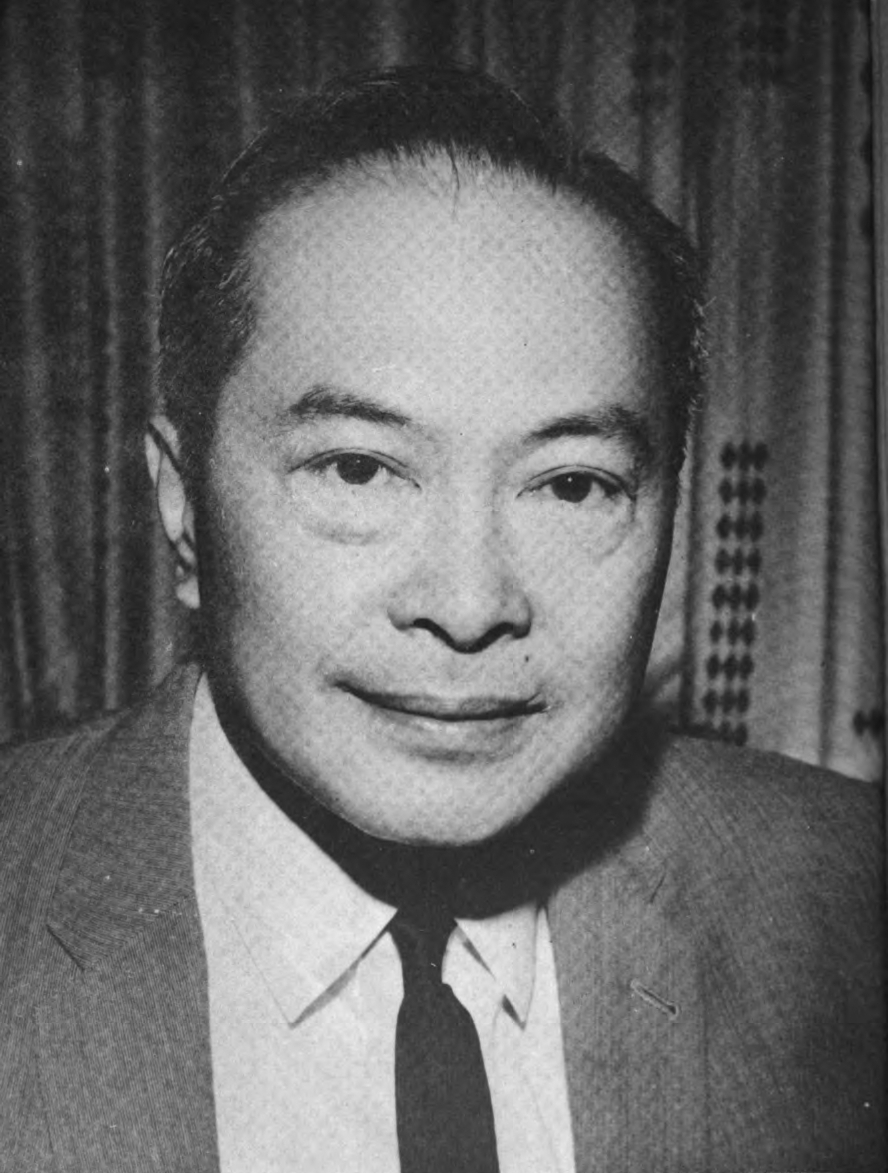
- Official portrait during the 6th Congress

9th and 12th Speaker of the House of Representatives of the Philippines
- In office February 2, 1967 – April 1, 1971
- Preceded by: Cornelio Villareal
- Succeeded by: Cornelio Villareal
- In office January 25, 1954 – December 30, 1957
- Preceded by: Eugenio Pérez
- Succeeded by: Daniel Z. Romualdez

Minority Leader of the Regular Batasang Pambansa
- In office July 23, 1984 – March 25, 1986
- Preceded by: Hilario Davide Jr. (as Minority Leader of the Interim Batasang Pambansa)
- Succeeded by: Rodolfo Albano (as House Minority Leader)

House Minority Leader
- In office January 17, 1966 – December 30, 1969
- Preceded by: Daniel Z. Romualdez
- Succeeded by: Justiniano Montano
- In office December 30, 1949 – December 30, 1953
- Preceded by: Cipriano Primicias Sr.
- Succeeded by: Eugenio Pérez

Member of the Regular Batasang Pambansa from Batangas
- In office June 30, 1984 – March 25, 1986 Serving with Manuel Collantes, Hernando Perez, and Rafael Recto

Member of the House of Representatives from Batangas' 3rd district
- In office December 30, 1961 – September 23, 1972
- Preceded by: Jose Laurel IV
- Succeeded by: District abolished (Next held by Milagros Laurel-Trinidad)
- In office June 11, 1945 – December 30, 1957
- Preceded by: District re-established (Previously held by Maximo Kalaw)
- Succeeded by: Jose Laurel IV

Member of the National Assembly from Batangas
- In office September 25, 1943 – February 2, 1944 Serving with Maximo Malvar

Personal details
- Born: José Bayani Hidalgo Laurel Jr. August 27, 1912 Tanauan, Batangas, Philippine Islands
- Died: March 11, 1998 (aged 85) Manila, Philippines
- Party: Nacionalista (1941–1942; 1945–1998)
- Other political affiliations: UNIDO (1980–1988); KALIBAPI (1942–1945)
- Spouse: Remedios Lerma
- Children: 3 (including Jose IV)
- Parents: José P. Laurel; Pacencia Laurel
- Relatives: Laurel family
- Education: University of the Philippines Diliman (LL.B)
- Occupation: Politician
- Profession: Lawyer
- Nickname: Pepito

Jose Bayani "Pepito" Hidalgo Laurel Jr. (August 27, 1912 – March 11, 1998) was a Filipino politician and lawyer who was elected twice as speaker of the House of Representatives of the Philippines. A stalwart of the Nacionalista Party, he was the party's candidate for the country's vice president in the 1957 elections.

== Early life and education ==
Laurel was born on August 27, 1912, in Tanauan, Batangas, the eldest son of Jose P. Laurel, who would serve as president of the Philippines from 1943 to 1945, and Pacencia Hidalgo Laurel. His brother, Salvador, would become vice-president in 1986, Sotero would be elected as a senator in 1987. Another brother, Jose S. Laurel III, served as ambassador to Japan. His youngest brother, Arsenio, was the first two-time winner of the Macau Grand Prix.

Laurel finished his intermediate and secondary education in Manila, and enrolled at the University of the Philippines. In 1936, he received his law degree from the U.P. College of Law and passed the bar exams the following year. There, he served as president of the U.P. Student Council and captain of the university's debate team. He was a member of the Upsilon Sigma Phi fraternity.

== Political career ==
In 1941, Laurel won his first election, as a member of the House of Representatives from the 3rd district of Batangas. However, his term was deferred by the Japanese invasion in late 1941. For the duration of the war, Laurel assisted his father, who was designated as president of the Philippines under the Second Philippine Republic, and served as a representative for the at-large district of Batangas in the National Assembly from 1943 to 1944.

Beginning in March 1945, Laurel, together with his family, Camilo Osías, Benigno Aquino Sr., General Tomas Capinpin, and Jorge B. Vargas evacuated to Baguio. Shortly after the city fell, they traveled to Tuguegarao, where they embarked on a bomber plane to Japan via Formosa (now Taiwan) and Shanghai, China. On September 15, days after Japan formally surrendered to the United States, his father, his brother Jose III, and Aquino were arrested by a group of Americans headed by a U.S. Army Colonel named Turner for collaborating with Imperial Japan and were imprisoned in Japan. He later joined the rest of the Laurel family in flying back to Manila on November 2.

Laurel's term as representative for the 3rd district of Batangas began only in 1945. When the Philippine Congress was restored upon independence in 1946, he again sought election to the House of Representatives representing the 3rd district of Batangas. He was successful in his bid, having been re-elected to the second and third congresses. In 1954, he was elected to his first term as speaker of the House. He decided not to seek re-election for his seat in the House in 1957 as he was drafted instead to run for vice president under the Nacionalista ticket spearheaded by President Carlos P. Garcia. He was defeated by Pampanga 1st district Representative Diosdado Macapagal of the Liberal Party even as Garcia went on to win.

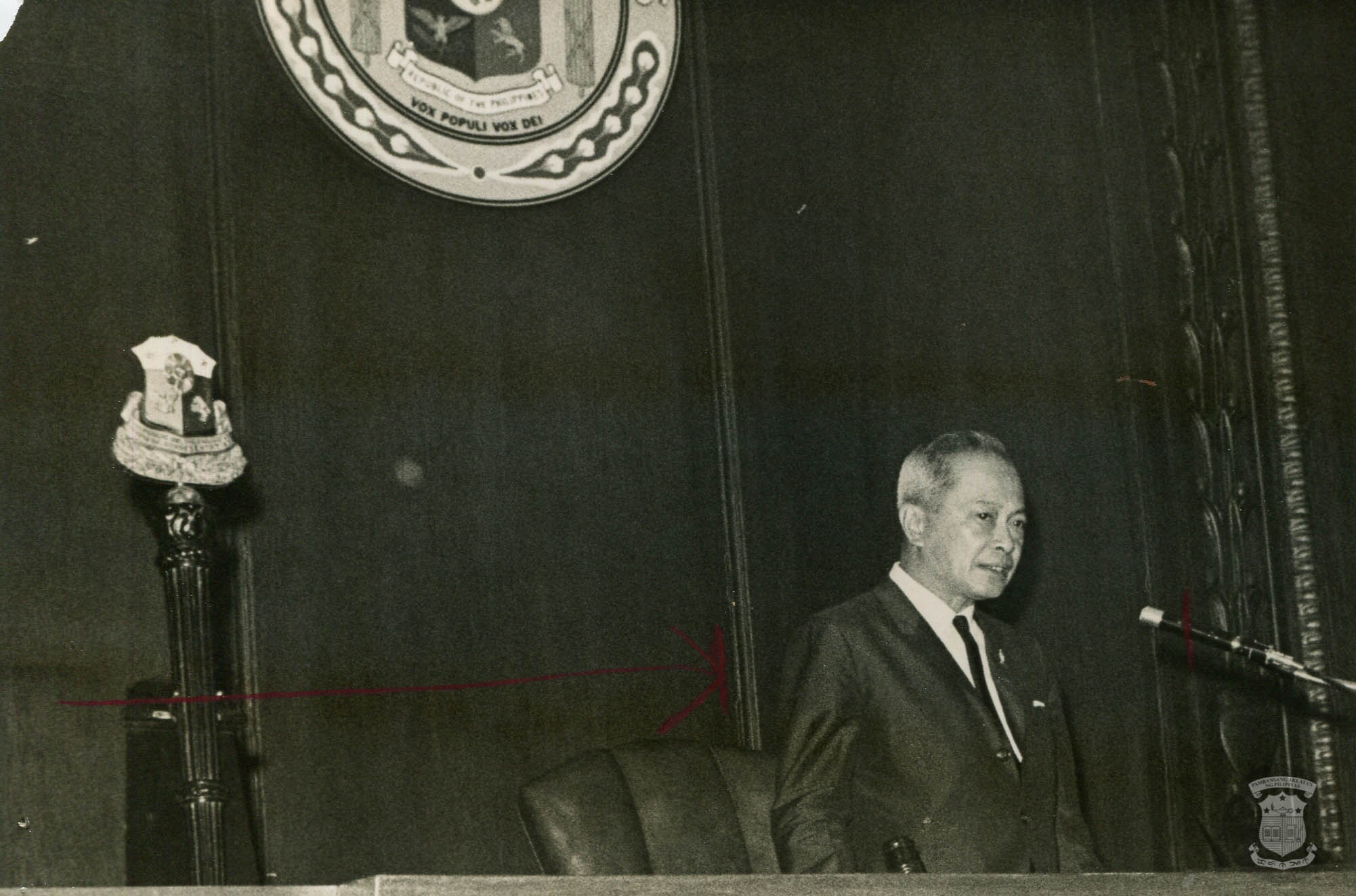
Jose Laurel Jr. during session at the House of Representatives

In 1961, Laurel regained his seat in the House of Representatives and would serve in that capacity until martial law was declared in 1972. During his tenure as congressman, Laurel had a residence in Mandaluyong, Rizal. Laurel was among those who, in 1965, recruited Senate president Ferdinand Marcos to join the Nacionalista Party as its presidential candidate against Diosdado Macapagal. He was again elected speaker in February 1967 and remained in that position until 1971, when Cornelio Villareal (Capiz–2nd) of the Liberal Party regained the speakership. During his congressional career, Laurel focused on economic issues. He was an advocate of a planned economy and protectionism.

=== Attempted assassination ===
On the evening of October 9, 1967, Laurel was dining with his aide at Maxim's Supper Club & Steak House in Pasay City when he was shot twice by an assailant, with bullets hitting his face and chest. His aide attempted to shoot back at the gunman who then fled the scene.

=== Martial law ===
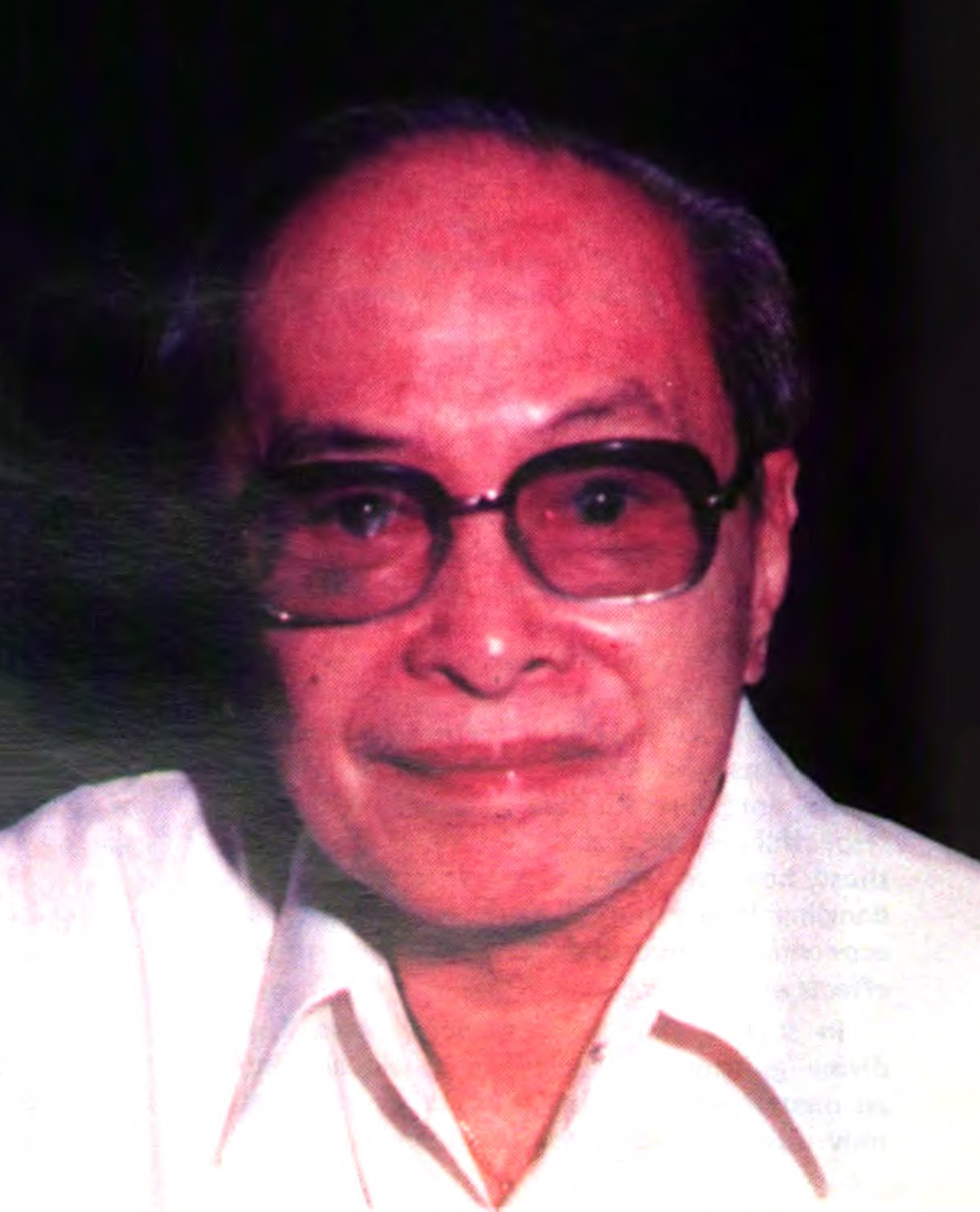
Laurel from the Official Directory of the Constitutional Commission, c. 1986

In January 1971, after President Ferdinand Marcos voiced the possibility of imposing nationwide martial law in his sixth State of the Nation Address, Laurel voiced his opinion that a declaration of martial law would be "an admission of weakness" for his administration. Laurel's political career was halted after Congress dissolved due to the implementation of martial law in September 1972. However, by the 1980s, he continued to serve as head of the Laurel wing of the Nacionalista Party. In 1981, he began serving as spokesperson alongside LP President Gerry Roxas for the newly-formed opposition party called the United Nationalist Democratic Organization (UNIDO), led by his brother Salvador Laurel. Although UNIDO held a boycott stance for the 1981 presidential election, Laurel expressed support for the candidacy of Nacionalista nominee Alejo Santos, stating that although he committed himself to the boycott, his followers will not be prevented from supporting Santos in the election. He was later elected as an assemblyman from Batangas in the Regular Batasang Pambansa in 1984, serving until its end in early 1986 as a result of the People Power Revolution.

=== Fifth Republic ===
In 1986, after the overthrow of President Marcos, Laurel became a member of the 1986 Constitutional Commission that drafted the present Philippine Constitution. Although his wing of the Nacionalista Party attempted unification talks with the Roy wing led by Rene Cayetano, negotiations faltered as a result of "irreconcilable differences", with a third splinter group led by Arturo Tolentino also being formed by February 1987. Throughout 1987, Laurel led further unification talks with the other NP factions. In December 1987, Laurel had a near-debilitating heart attack, but he recovered enough by January 2, 1988 to give a speech supporting his grandnephew Benjie Laurel's gubernatorial candidacy in Batangas.

== Personal life ==
Laurel had three children with Remedios Lerma: Jose Macario IV (1932–2025), Jaime ("Banjo", 1938–1970), and Milagros ("Lally", born 1941). Jose IV and Lally became members of the House of Representatives, representing the same seat their father had held. The actor Noel Trinidad was his son-in-law through Lally. Banjo was elected mayor of Tanauan, Batangas in 1967, but died in a helicopter crash in Camarines Sur on the evening of January 10, 1970.

=== Death ===
Laurel died of pneumonia at the age of 85 on March 11, 1998.

== Notes ==
Political offices
Preceded by Cipriano Primicias Sr.	Minority Floor Leader of the House of Representatives; 1949–1953	Succeeded by Eugenio Perez
Preceded by Eugenio Pérez	Speaker of the House of Representatives; 1953–1957	Succeeded by Daniel Romualdez
Preceded by Daniel Z. Romualdez	Minority Floor Leader of the House of Representatives; 1966–1969	Succeeded by Justiniano Montano
Preceded by Cornelio Villareal	Speaker of the House of Representatives; 1967–1971	Succeeded by Cornelio Villareal
House of Representatives of the Philippines
Recreated Title last held by Maximo Kalaw as Assemblyman	Representative, 3rd District of Batangas; 1945–1957	Succeeded by Jose M. Laurel IV
Preceded by Jose M. Laurel IV	Representative, 3rd District of Batangas; 1961–1972	Vacant Martial Law Title next held by Milagros Laurel-Trinidad
Party political offices
Preceded by Carlos P. Garcia	Nacionalista nominee for Vice President of the Philippines; 1957	Succeeded by Gil Puyat
