= Lauro Baja =

Filipino diplomat (1937–2024)

Lauro Liboon Baja Jr. (May 2, 1937 – February 8, 2024) was a Filipino diplomat who was a permanent representative to the United Nations for the Republic of the Philippines and undersecretary of the Philippines' Department of Foreign Affairs. He presented his credentials to the Secretary-General of the United Nations on 21 May 2003, replacing former Ambassador Alfonso T. Yuchengco. He was replaced by former Chief Justice Hilario Davide in 2006.

Baja led the Philippine delegation in a two-year membership in the Security Council. He was president of the Security Council, first in June 2004 and again in September 2005. Between 2003 and 2004, Amb. Baja was chairman of the United Nations General Assembly Sixth Committee (Legal).

In 2003 he was conferred by President Arroyo the Order of Sikatuna with the rank of Datu, the highest award a member of the Philippine Foreign Service could receive. In 1999, he received the Gawad Mabini Award with the rank of Dakilang Kamanong. The Philippine Jaycees Senate named Ambassador Baja the Outstanding Filipino (TOFIL) Awardee for his outstanding work in the field of bilateral and multilateral diplomacy.

Baja died from a heart attack on February 8, 2024, at the age of 86.

== Maid abuse charges ==
On June 24, 2008, Baja, his wife, Norma Castro Baja, and his daughter, Maria Elizabeth Baja Facundo, were named co-defendants in a US civil complaint filed at Southern District of Manhattan, alleging trafficking, forced labor, peonage and racketeering. The complainant claimed that she worked 16-hour days for seven days a week at Mr. Baja's consular residence and was subjected to verbal and physical abuse from the Baja family.

The plaintiff, Ms. Baoanan, accused the Baja family of paying her only $100 for three months' work and another $100 for looking after Facundo's son. Baja stated, however, that "as per our records" Baoanan received $200 a month, and the amount was remitted to her Manila family. Baja further said that Baoanan arrived in New York in January 2006 but left them three months later, without their knowledge. The New York state minimum wage was $7.15 per hour while Baja has openly admitted paying his maid an average of $6.60 per day.

Norma Baja hired New York attorney Salvador Tuy to file answer and moral damage counter suit against their former maid. “We have called a lawyer in New York … a Fil-Am lawyer … to file a case against her for damages because as you know, my husband is a multi-awarded diplomat. It’s either because she’s looking for monetary considerations since she filed a civil suit before the New York Southern District court where she can seek back wages or she’s trying to prolong her stay there (in the United States)."

Baja said he paid his former maid $1,000 a month and had papers to show it. In her three-month stay with the family, Baoanan received $200 pocket money monthly and $800 went to her family in the Philippines: “The salary of $1,000 was required by the US Embassy before (Baoanan’s) visa was issued.” Baja stated he was also puzzled by silence of Hilario Davide, Jr., Philippine representative to the UN: "I have not [heard] a word, nothing."

Her US federal lawsuit, which was filed after a criminal investigation by US authorities, was closed with no charges filed. Baoanan said she paid $5,000 to Baja and Baja's wife's travel agency for a promised nursing job. The Asian American Legal Defense and Education Fund provided her with legal representation. Marichu Suarez Baoanan, who worked in the ambassadorial townhouse on 15 East 66th Street, Upper East Side, stated: "I did not have hope of escape. I thought of committing suicide because I was so depressed. They paid me with curses, insults, disrespect. They didn’t treat me like a person. I was under the impression they would help me find work as a nurse, instead I was forced to work as a servant for 3 months under abusive conditions.”

Baja, Jr., on July 16, 2008, moved to reject service of summons and dismiss the complaint. Baja argued he was “diplomatically immune from criminal, civil and administrative suits from all courts of the United States and its states under the provisions of the Vienna Convention on Diplomatic Relations." Baja alleged that "when the alleged violations transpired between January 13 and April 13, 2006, he was the Philippine permanent representative to the United Nations and head of the Philippine Mission located in New York City."

== Graft and corruption cases ==
Presidential Anti-Graft Commission (PAGC) Chair Constancia de Guzman and Commissioner Jaime Jacob filed criminal cases with the Ombudsman against Baja on March 12 for violations of the Government Procurement Act, the Anti-Graft and Corrupt Practices Act (R.A. 3019), the Code of Conduct and Ethical Standards for Public Officials and Employees, and of technical malversation. Jacob submitted copies of the DFA fact-finding team's report, sworn statements, related documents, and a report of the Commission on Audit, as evidence. On 29 March 2011, Lauro Baja was charged by the Office of the Special Prosecutor with two criminal cases, one for malversation of public funds and another for violation of the Anti-Graft and Corrupt Practices Act. The fund anomalies occurred in two separate instances while Baja was the chief of mission at the UN (2003–2007). The charges were dismissed on March 20, 2017, by the Sandiganbayan Fourth Division for insufficiency of evidence.

== Reactions ==
- Migrante International per chair Connie Bragas-Regalado asked the Arroyo administration for a thorough probe into Baja's involvement in maltreating Baoanan: “This modus operandi of our erring diplomatic officials trafficking Filipinos so they may take them as slaves has got to stop. Baja’s case would be a litmus test for the Philippines that recently won the vice-presidency of the United Nations Human Rights Council. We challenge the newly elected Vice President to the UNHRC Erlinda Basilio to take the lead in investigating the charges against the former UN Security Council President and to ensure that no white wash takes place, if indeed the Philippines is bent on upholding human rights in the UN body." She noted that on 2007, a San Francisco Philippine Consulate consul's mother pleaded guilty of exploiting a Filipina and paid her $78,000 in back wages.
- Hong Kong-based Filipino Community Services and Information Network (Filcomsin)'s Edna Aquino said that “the Bajas defensively divert the blame on their domestic worker by questioning and putting motives on leaving her employment after three months; the minimum wage for a household domestic worker based on Philippine Overseas Employment Administration (POEA) Directive of January 2007 is $400; Even by Philippine standards, this [$200] (paid by Baja) is already quite exploitative; Baja and the Department of Foreign Affairs (DFA) did not consult the Philippine Overseas Employment Administration (POEA)."
- Gabriela party-list Rep. Liza Maza, main author of the Anti-Trafficking in Persons Act of 2003, said Baja may be liable for qualified trafficking under Philippine law if Baoanan pursued the case in a Philippine court: “It is disturbing that a Philippine ambassador, no less than the head of the Philippine Mission to the United Nations and a former president of the UN Security Council, is now being accused of trafficking; (He) should be setting the standards for the compensation and treatment of Filipina workers; The minimum wage in the United States is actually $5.85 per hour. Moreover, the average Filipina domestic worker is paid $300 to $500.” In 2003, the labor department in Metro Manila ruled that Norma Baja, Elizabeth Baja and Baja-owned Labaire International Travel, were guilty of non-compliance with labor standards involving former employees who were forced to sign cash vouchers and quit claims in exchange for their salaries amounting to P 298,481.15. In 1995, the Manila Regional Trial Court found Labaire guilty of breach of contract for failure to comply with a travel and tour package to Palawan which had already been partially paid for by the complainants. The Court of Appeals later reversed both decisions.

== See also ==
- Philippine Center
- Rafael M. Salas

Diplomatic posts
Preceded by Alfonso T. Yuchengco	Philippine Permanent Representative to the United Nations; 2003–2006	Succeeded by Hilario Davide, Jr.
