= Technological University of the Philippines =

Public university in Manila, Philippines

- Teknolohikal na Unibersidad ng Pilipinas (Filipino)
- Latin: Technologica Universitas Philippinarum
- Former names: Manila Trade School (1901–1910); Philippine School of Arts and Trades (1910–1959); Philippine College of Arts and Trades (1959–1978)
- Motto: Haligi ng Bayan
- Motto in English: Foundation of the Nation
- Type: Public State Nonsectarian higher education institution
- Established: 1901; 125 years ago
- Academic affiliations: ASAIHL
- Endowment: ₱448.5 million (US$10.4 million)
- President: Engr. Reynaldo P. Ramos, Ph.D., EnP.
- Vice-president: Engr. Ryan C. Reyes, DT (VP for Academic Affairs)
- Faculty: Approx. 500
- Undergraduates: Approx. 10,000
- Location: Manila, Philippines; 14°35′12″N 120°59′06″E
- Campus: Main: Ermita, Manila Satellite: Taguig City Metro Manila; Dasmariñas City Cavite; Talisay City Negros Occidental; Cuenca, Batangas; Lopez, Quezon
- Hymn: TUP Hymn
- Colors: Cardinal Red Grey
- Nicknames: TUPian, ka-PUTO, PUTOs
- Sporting affiliations: SCUAA, PISCUAA
- Mascot: Gray Hawk
- Website: www.tup.edu.ph
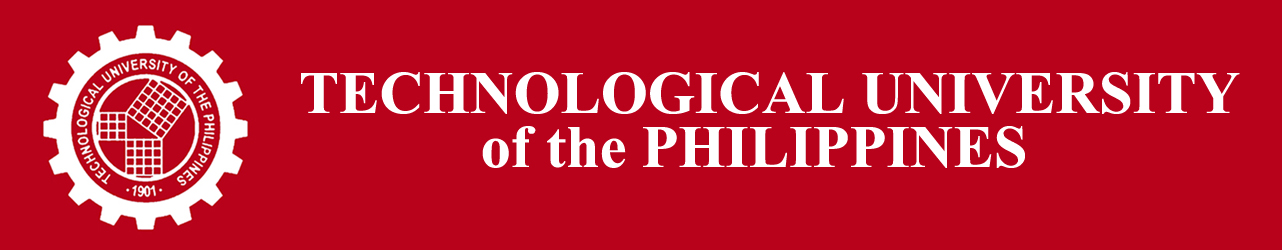
- Logo of Technological University of the Philippines

- Location in Manila Location in Metro Manila Location in Luzon Location in the Philippines

The Technological University of the Philippines (Filipino: Teknolohikal na Unibersidad ng Pilipinas), commonly known as TUP, is a state university in the Philippines. It was established in 1901 by the Philippine Commission. TUP has its main campus in Manila and satellite campuses in Taguig, Cavite, Visayas, Batangas, and Quezon.

== History ==
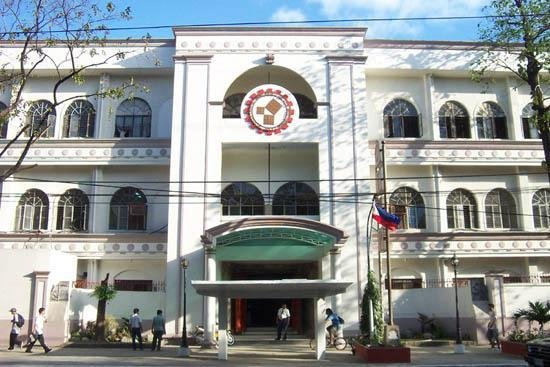
The facade of the university

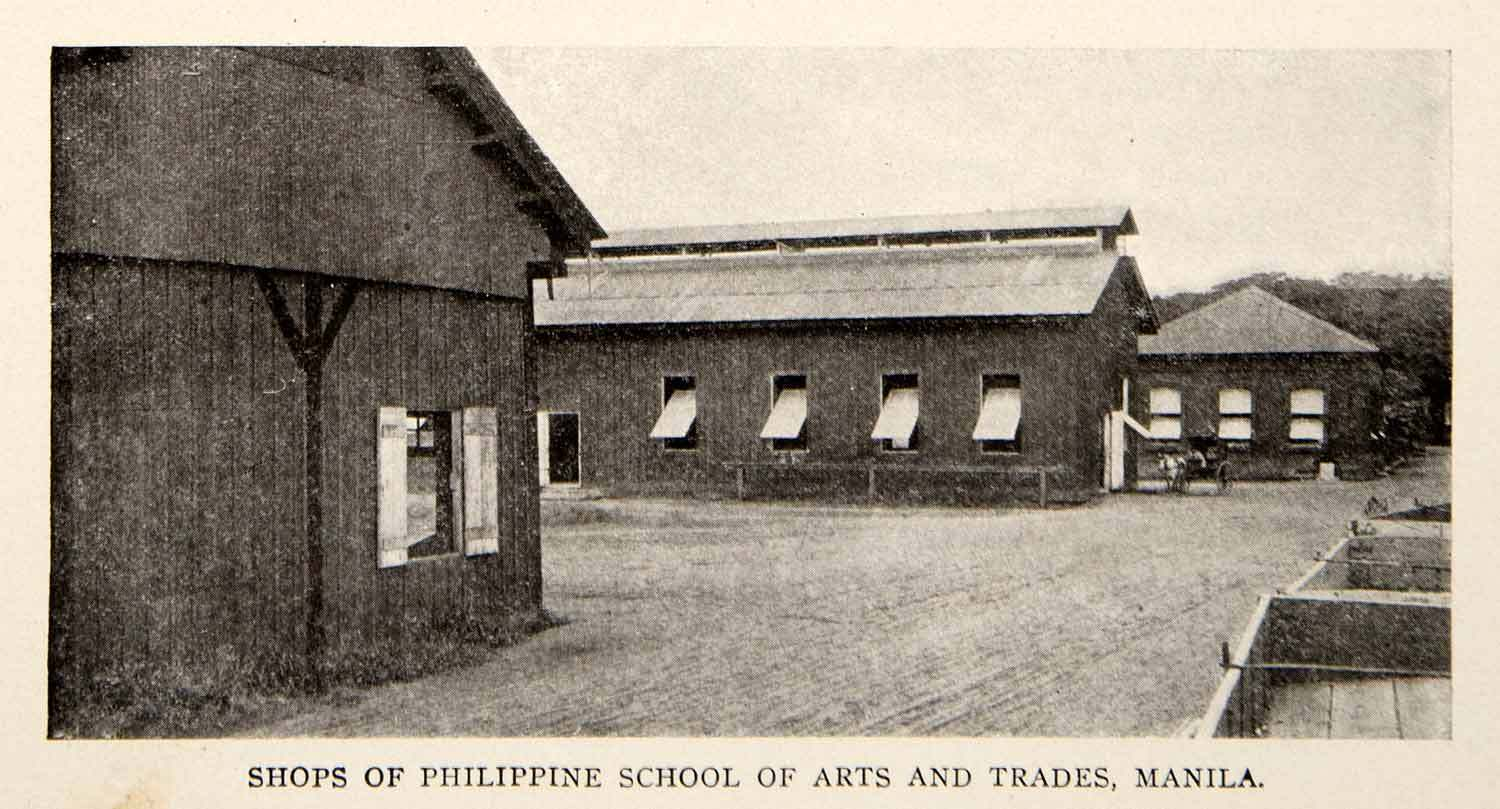
Philippine School of Arts and Trades

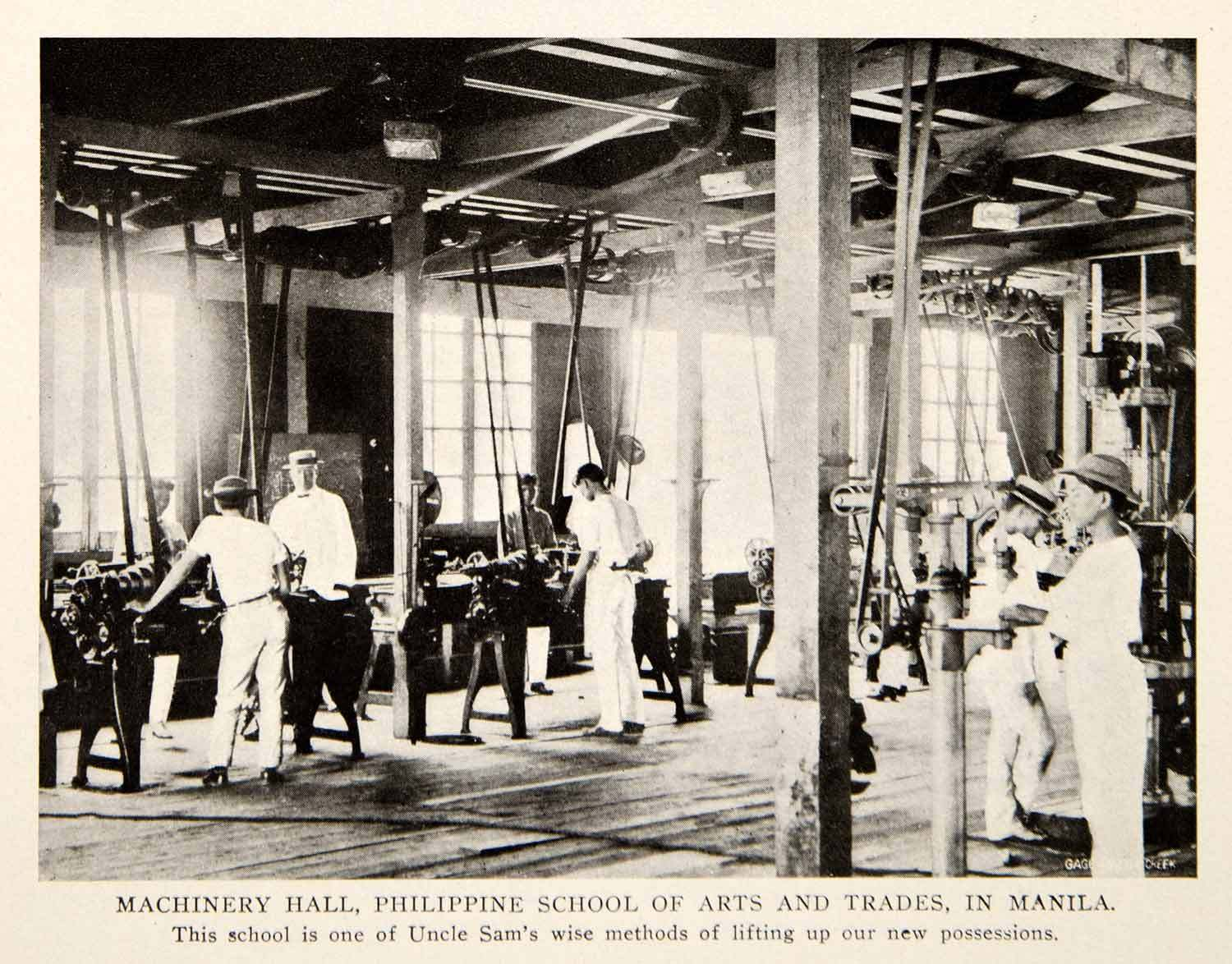
Machinery Hall Philippine School of Arts and Trades

The 1901 Act No. 74 of the United States Philippines Commission established the Manila Trade School (MTS) near Ateneo de Manila in Intramuros. In 1910, the Manila Trade School was renamed as the Philippine School of Arts and Trades (PSAT), and again in 1959 as the Philippine College of Arts and Trade (PCAT). From 1959 to 1978, PCAT pioneered programs in engineering technology and industrial teacher education. On July 11, 1978, by virtue of Presidential Decree No. 1518, the Philippine College of Arts and Trades was converted into the Technological University of the Philippines.

In 1999 TUP was designated a Center of Excellence in the AIMEICC Working Group on Human Resource Development as certified by the Department of Trade and Industry. In the same year, the university was awarded as a Center of Development (COD) by the Commission on Higher Education (CHED) in Electrical Engineering (Category 2), Mechanical Engineering (Category 1), and Civil Engineering (Category 1). In 2002, the Colombo Plan Staff College for Technician Education (CSPC) presented a plaque of recognition to TUP as a Center of Excellence in Graduate Fellowship Programme for Technological, Technical, Industrial, and Vocational Education. The Association of Overseas Technical Scholarship (AOTS) based in Japan awarded TUP as a Center of Excellence.

== Colleges and Academic Programs ==
College Name	Founded	Dean	Departments
College of Engineering	1979	Engr. Lean Karlo S. Tolentino, Ph.D., PECE, ASEAN Eng.	Civil Engineering; Electrical Engineering; Electronics Engineering; Mechanical Engineering
College of Industrial Technology	1978	Prof. Elpidio T. Virrey	Basic Industrial Technology; Civil Engineering Technology; Electrical Engineering Technology; Electronics Engineering Technology; Food and Apparel Technology; Graphic Arts and Printing Technology; Mechanical Engineering Technology; Power Plant Engineering Technology
College of Industrial Education	1978	Dr. Apollo P. Portez	Professional Industrial Education; Student Teaching; Technical Arts; Home Economics
College of Architecture & Fine Arts	1979	Arch. Elpidio T. Balais Jr.	Architecture; Fine Arts; Graphics
College of Science	1995	Dr. Joshua Soriano (Acting)	Chemistry; Computer Science; Mathematics; Physics
College of Liberal Arts	1995	Dr. Michael Bhobet Baluyot	Languages; Entrepreneurship and Management; Physical Education; Social Science

=== College of Engineering ===
The College of Engineering was designated a Center of Development (COD) by the Commission on Higher Education (CHED) in 1999. CHED no longer includes TUP among its list of CODs.

=== College of Industrial Technology ===
The College of Industrial Technology traces its roots from the Technical Department of the then Philippine School of Arts and Trades adapted in 1937 and is the center of industrial technology education in the university.

=== College of Industrial Education ===
The roots of the College of Industrial Education (CIE) can be traced in 1929 when the first formal two-year Industrial Teacher Education was offered at the then Philippine School of Arts and Trades. At present, the college serves as the foundation of teacher education in the university. The BS in Industrial Education program at CIE has been offered since 1951 as a four-year teacher education for elementary and secondary levels.

=== College of Architecture and Fine Arts ===
The roots of the College of Architecture and Fine Arts (CAFA) can be traced from the drawing subjects required in all courses offered by the university since 1907. The college has been a consistent contributor to the university's achievements and recognition in various art competitions both local and abroad. The CAFA also produces top passers in the Licensure Examination given by the Professional Regulation Commission.

=== College of Science ===
The 1978 promotion of the college to university status brought about comprehensive changes in the organizational set-up. To carry out its tasks, the university had to change its one-college structure to a system composed of six colleges, one of which is the College of Arts and Sciences (CAS). The CAS was formally created in 1979.

=== College of Liberal Arts ===
The College of Liberal Arts split from the College of Applied Arts and Sciences and was formerly a full-service college.

== Satellite campuses ==
TUP Taguig was established in 1977 as one of the three prototype technician institutes in the Philippines. On January 3, 1985, the BOR passed and adopted Resolution No. 100 s. 1985 changing the name of the Manila Technician Institute to TUP Taguig campus. TUP Taguig offers programs at the pre-baccalaureate, baccalaureate, and masters levels.

TUP Cavite was established through Board Resolution No. 1985, s. 1979. The campus offers 3-year technology courses and baccalaureate and master's degree programs.

The intervention of the university on TUP Visayas campus started with the Letter of Instruction (LOI) No. 79 issued by President Ferdinand E. Marcos on December 28, 1978, authorizing TUP to administer the operation of the then Visayas Technician Institute. The campus offers 3-year technology courses, a baccalaureate degree, and a master's degree in technology.

The Technological University of the Philippines in Lopez, Quezon held its first graduation rites in 2015.

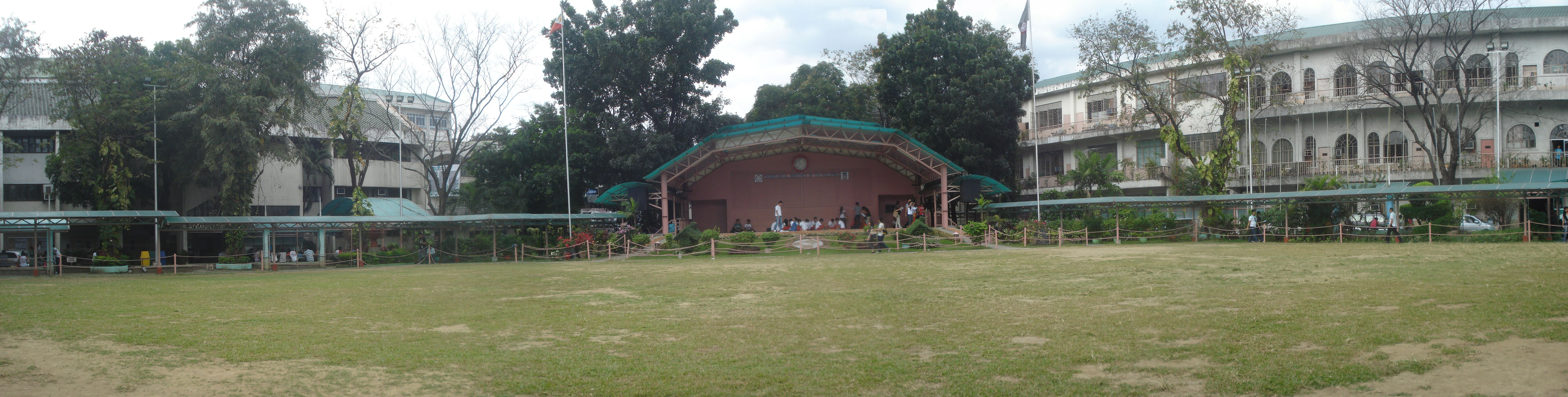

== Integrated Research Training Center ==
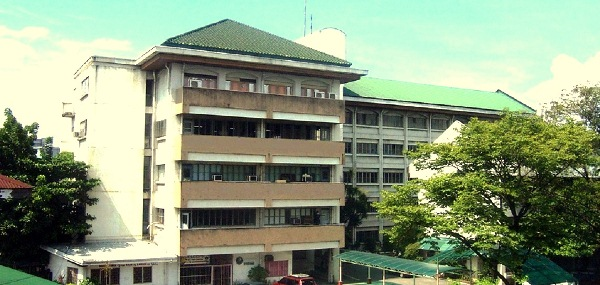
The IRTC Building

The Integrated Research and Training Center (IRTC) is a Japan International Cooperation Agency established center under the care of the Technological University of the Philippines. IRTC provides updated training and meaningful research results towards the continuous development of engineering programs and practices.

The Center provides facilities in the following areas: material engineering and testing, energy engineering, automation, communications, educational multimedia technology, manufacturing, and production engineering. IRTC is the research, training, and extension arm of the Technological University of the Philippines. It also provides services to industries and higher education institutions, primarily to the state universities and colleges.

== Governance and administrative structure ==
The key stakeholders of TUP make up its Board of Regents, chaired by the Commissioner of the Commission of Higher Education and vice-chaired by the University President. The members of the Board include the Chairman of the House Committee on Higher and Technical Education, the Chairman of the Senate Committee on Education and Culture, the Undersecretary for R&D of the Department of Science and Technology, the Assistant Director General from the National Economic and Development Authority (NEDA), two representatives from the private sector, and the three presidents of the federations of associations in TUP composed of the Alumni Association, the Faculty Association, and the University Student Government.

Name	Position
Dr. Reynaldo P. Ramos	President
Dr. Hasmin T. Ignacio	Vice President for Academic Affairs
Atty. Christoper M. Mortel	Vice President for Administration and Finance
Dr. Emmanuel A. Ferrer	Vice President for Research and Extension
Dr. Ma. Leonor F. Validor	Vice President for Planning and Development

== Publications ==
logo of The Philippine Artisan

- The Philippine Artisan is the official student publication of the university since 1944.
- The Philippine Artisan has a different office publication for the campuses of the university.
- The Philippine Journal of Industrial Education and Technology (PJIET) is the university's bi-annual research publication. It publishes research outputs, factual/critical articles, research and book reviews in industrial education and technological research. PJIET is published by the TUP University Research and Development Services (URDS).

== Gallery ==
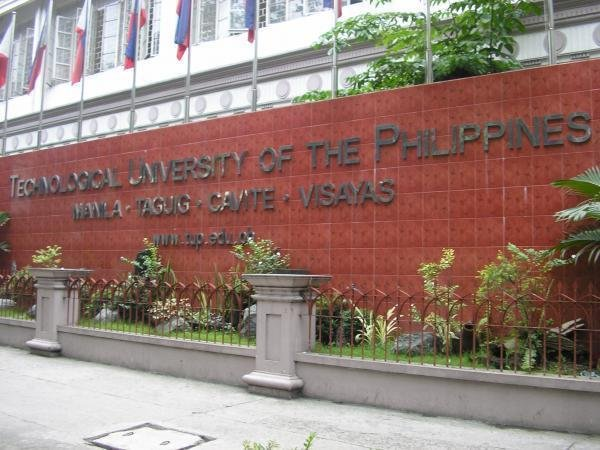

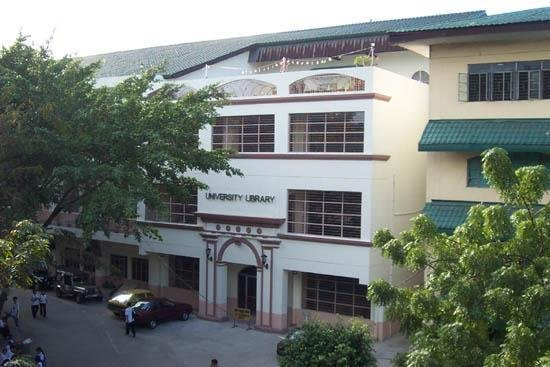
The University Library

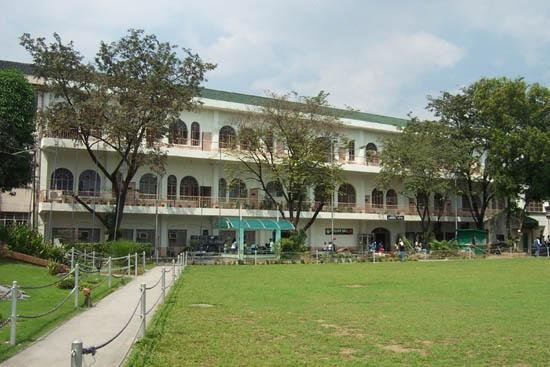
College of Science and College of Liberal Arts

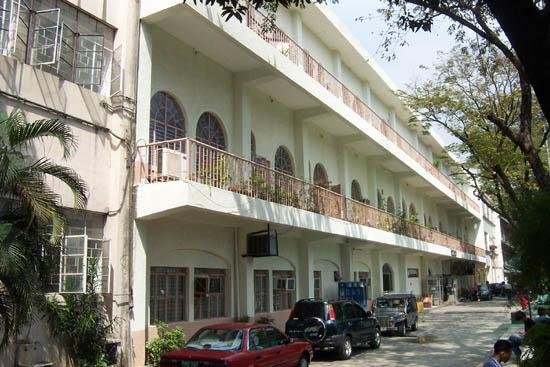
College of Science and College of Liberal Arts taken in front of the centennial stage

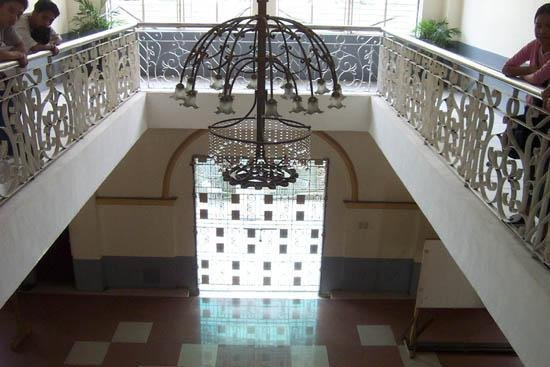
The lobby taken at the second floor

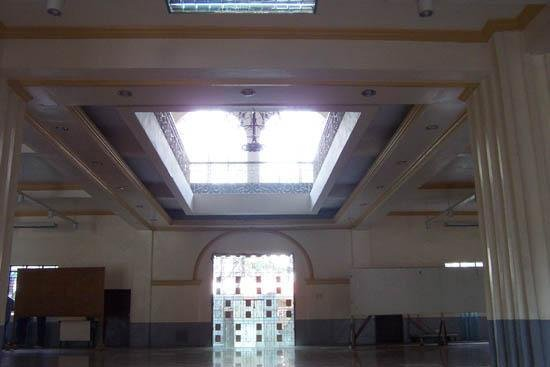
The Lobby
