= Carlos Hilado Memorial State University =

Public university in Negros Occidental, Philippines

- Pamantasang Pampamahalaang Pang-alaala Carlos Hilado (Filipino)
- Former names: Negros Occidental School of Arts and Trades (1954–1984); Paglaum State College (1984–1994); Carlos Hilado Memorial State College (1994–2022)
- Motto: "Transforming lives and shaping dreams for a sustainable world"
- Type: State university, Research university, Nonsectarian, Coeducational
- Established: 1954; 72 years ago
- Endowment: 2006 (Php) 85,461,829.92
- President: Norberto P. Mangulabnan, PhD
- Vice-president: Jay B. Estrellas, EdD (VP for Academic Affairs); Rosalinda S. Tuvilla, JD (VP for Administration & Finance); Andrew Eusebio S. Tan, PhD (VP for Research, Extension & Intellectual Property)
- Location: Talisay, Negros Occidental, Philippines; 10°38′36″N 122°56′22″E
- Campus: Urban, 5 ha (12 acres) (with 3 satellite campuses)
- Demonym: CHMSUans
- Sporting affiliations: SCUAA
- Website: https://chmsu.edu.ph/
- Location in the Visayas Location in the Philippines

Carlos Hilado Memorial State University (CHMSU, pronounced /kəmsuː/; Filipino: Pamantasang Pampamahalaang Pang-alaala Carlos Hilado), also colloquially called by its former acronym CHMSC (pronounced /kəmsi/), is a public, state-owned university, the main campus of which is in Talisay, Negros Occidental, Philippines. It provides preschool, elementary, secondary, higher technological, professional and vocational instruction and training in science, agriculture and industrial fields, as well as short-term or vocational courses.

== History ==
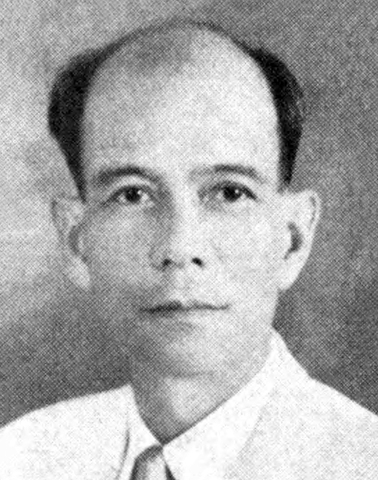
Carlos Hilado

In 1954, the representative of the Second District of Negros Occidental, Carlos A. Hilado authored a bill creating the first trade-technical school in the province, the Negros Occidental School of Arts and Trades in the then town of Talisay.

In 1984, Paglaum State College was established by virtue of Batas Pambansa No. 477, which caused the merger of three educational institutions in the province of Negros Occidental: Negros Occidental School of Arts and Trades in Talisay, Provincial Community College in Fortune Towne, Bacolod City, and the Bacolod City National Trade School in Alijis, Bacolod City. Paglaum is a Hiligaynon word which means "hope".

In 1994, by virtue of Republic Act (RA) no. 7707 authored by Representative Jose Carlos V. Lacson, Paglaum State College was renamed Carlos Hilado Memorial State College in honor of Congressman Carlos A. Hilado.

On November 24, 2000, Carlos Hilado Memorial State College acquired another satellite campus with the integration of the Negros Occidental School of Fisheries in Binalbagan, Negros Occidental, into the state college.

In 2018, the family of then E.B. Magalona vice mayor Robert F. Acaling donated a 3-hectare lot in Barangay Alicante, EB Magalona, to serve as a Research and Extension Center of the university and named it the Jesús Fermin Research and Extension Center. In the same year, Carmen Agricultural Development Inc. also donated a 3-hectare lot in Barangay San Jose, Binalbagan.

On April 26, 2019, Carlos Hilado Memorial State College was converted into a state university as per law filed by Representatives Greg Gasataya of Bacolod, Albee Benitez of the Third District of Negros Occidental, and Bebot Mirasol of the Fifth District of Negros Occidental, by virtue of Republic Act (RA) no. 11336, which was sponsored by Senator Bam Aquino.

On April 19, 2022, the school officially changed its name to Carlos Hilado State University after the Commission on Higher Education en banc approved the conversion of the school and all its satellite campuses in Bacolod City and Municipality of Binalbagan through Resolution 209–2022 after having been found compliant with the requirements for conversion as stipulated in Section 21 of RA 11336.

== Campuses ==
- Main Campus – administrative seat in Talisay City
- Alijis Campus (formerly Bacolod City National Trade School) – Singcang-Airport, Bacolod City
- Fortune Towne Campus (formerly Negros Occidental Provincial Community College) – Sofia Gonzaga Street, Estefania, Bacolod City
- Binalbagan Campus (formerly Negros Occidental School of Fisheries) – Enclaro, Binalbagan

== Colleges ==
- College of Arts and Sciences
- College of Business Management and Accountancy
- College of Computer Studies
- College of Criminal Justice
- College of Education
- College of Engineering
- College of Fisheries
- College of Industrial Technology

== See also ==
- List of tertiary schools in Bacolod
- Technological University of the Philippines Visayas
