= Central Negros Electric Cooperative =

Defunct Electric cooperative in Negros Occidental, Philippines

Central Negros Electric Cooperative, Inc.
- Company type: Electric cooperative
- Industry: Electrical power industry
- Founded: February 24, 1975
- Defunct: July 31, 2024
- Fate: Consolidated into Negros Power
- Headquarters: Mabini Street, Bacolod City, Philippines
- Website: www.ceneco.ph

Central Negros Electric Cooperative, Inc., simply known as CENECO, was an electric cooperative in the Philippines. It was incorporated on February 24, 1975 and serves Bacolod City and nearby towns and cities in Negros Occidental.

CENECO distributes power over the Calumangan-San Enrique transmission lines. They have been reported to rely on supply shutoffs to do maintenance on electrical infrastructure.

They have been criticized for a perceived lack of transparency in their operations.

== History ==
CENECO initially serviced Silay City; on May 16, 1976, it took over the electric system of the Municipality of Murcia. In June 1978, with the help of the national government, CENECO purchased and took over the A. S. Diaz Electric service (ASDES) which served Bacolod and Talisay. The following year, in June 1979, CENECO took over the Bago Electric System and Ma-ao Electric System in Bago.

At this time, CENECO's generating units were hard-pressed to keep up with the load demand of its coverage area. CENECO had to resort to load shedding, which included scheduled brownouts. The power shortage was relieved with the coming of the power barge from the National Power Corporation on June 16, 1981. This was stationed along Bacolod's Reclamation Area Project and augmented CENECO's electric power supply.

Beginning July 4, 1984, the Palinpinon Geothermal Power Plant started supplying power to CENECO. The plant, located in Brgy. Palinpinon not far from Dumaguete City, became the main source of power for Negros Island. It supplied CENECO, VRESCO, NOCECO, NORECO I and NORECO II.

CENECO suffered a major loss in its operations with the coming of Typhoon Ruping in November 1991. Almost half of CENECO's electric poles had to be replaced or repaired due to damage. The work was so extensive that normal operation was restored the following year in February.

Other typhoons also contributed their share to the damage and to the losses of the cooperative. Typhoon Puring in 1993 and Typhoon Pepang in 1995 caused setbacks to CENECO's efforts to recover.

In late 2001, CENECO was padlocked by the Bacolod government over the cooperative's tax-exempt status, resulting in non-payment of franchise and other taxes, a dispute that was resolved with the intervention of the Department of the Interior and Local Government and the National Electrification Administration, which restored the status quo until the Supreme Court reaches a final decision.

The passage of R.A. 9136, otherwise known as the EPIRA 2001 or the Electric Power Industry Reform Act, has restructured the power situation in the country. This act has, among others, allowed the participation of the Independent Power Producers, the privatization of the National Power Corporation, and required the cooperatives and private distribution utilities to unbundle their power rates.

On July 31, 2024, all employees of CENECO have been laid off in preparation for its consolidation to Negros Power, with 220 employees from CENECO to join the transition. This came in after Primelectric entered a joint venture agreement with CENECO, which resulted in the former taking ownership of all of CENECO's assets.

== See also ==
- Energy in the Philippines
- Electricity sector in the Philippines
- Geothermal power in the Philippines
- National Electrification Administration
- Department of Energy (Philippines)
- Cooperative Development Authority
- Energy Regulatory Board
- Energy Regulatory Commission (Philippines)
- List of electric distribution utilities in the Philippines
- National Power Corporation
- National Transmission Corporation
- National Grid Corporation of the Philippines
