= Negros Power =

Electric company in Negros Occidental, Philippines

Negros Electric and Power Corporation
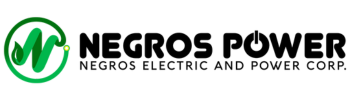
- Company type: Public
- Industry: Power distributor
- Key people: Roel Castro, President and CEO
- Parent: Primelectric Holdings, Inc.

Negros Electric and Power Corporation, or simply known as Negros Power, is an electric power distribution company in the Philippines. One of the three major electric power distributors in Negros Occidental, it was incorporated on July 31, 2024 to supersede CENECO. It serves the cities of Bacolod, Talisay, Silay and Bago, and the municipalities of Murcia and Don Salvador Benedicto, all of which are situated in Negros Occidental.

== History ==
=== Joint venture with CENECO ===
Negros Power was created as a joint venture between Primelectric Holdings Inc. (a subsidiary of MORE Power, an electric power company serving Iloilo City) and Central Negros Electric Cooperative (CENECO). Under the agreement, Primelectric acquired more than PHP2 billion worth of assets from CENECO, as well as having a 70 percent stake in cash generated from the company. Roel Castro, the president of NEPC, iterated that at least 220 employees have expressed their intention to join NEPC. Castro later said that NEPC’s joint venture with CENECO was aimed to modernize and rehabilitate the energy distribution system in the affected areas. In a plebiscite held between the months of June to August in 2023, over 55 percent of Ceneco's consumer members ratified the joint venture agreement between the two companies. NEPC also established a five-year plan to rehabilitate and modernize the electric infrastructure in its franchise area.

=== Franchise and operations ===
On February 22, 2024, House Bill 9805 was filed by representatives Joseph Paduano, Juliet Ferrer, Francisco Benitez, Greg Gasataya, and Gustavo Tambuting, which details the scope and extent of administration that is held by both Primelectric and CENECO. The House Bill later passed the third reading on May 20, 2024 with an overwhelming 22-1 vote in the Senate. Two months later, on July 26, 2024, President Bongbong Marcos signed Republic Act No. 12011, which grants Negros Power a franchise to operate within the territory previously administered by CENECO for 25 years.

Currently, Negros Power is applying for a certificate of public convenience and necessity from the Energy Regulatory Commission (ERC) in order to officially commence its operations, which are projected to begin in the third quarter of 2024. Castro later elaborated that Negros Power has prepared the offices, materials, and equipment needed for its upcoming operation in August, and will establish a temporary office on the second floor of Robinsons East on Burgos Street. The company also hired more than 200 employees formerly under CENECO to comprise its various units.

Two transformers were commissioned in Bacolod to stabilize the city’s power, which came less than a week after a power outage, caused by the breakdown of a transformer in the Alijis substation, affected at least 48,000 consumers in the city, particularly in the barangays of Alijis, Mansilingan, Felisa, and Handumanan.

== Service area ==
Being one of the three major electricity distributors in Negros Occidental, Negros Power serves the highly-urbanized city of Bacolod, the component cities of Bago, Silay, and Talisay, and the municipalities of Don Salvador Benedicto and Murcia. Since the company takes ownership of the assets of CENECO under the joint venture agreement, it has feeders situated in Alijis, Asedes-Gonzaga, Reclamation, Burgos, Mountain View, Talisay, Panao-Gao, Lopez, Murcia, Sum-ag, and Hilangban, which relay the electricity to a couple of areas within the company’s franchise territory.

== See also ==
- MORE Power
