= Talisay, Negros Occidental =

Component city in Negros Occidental, Philippines

Talisay
- Component city
- City of Talisay
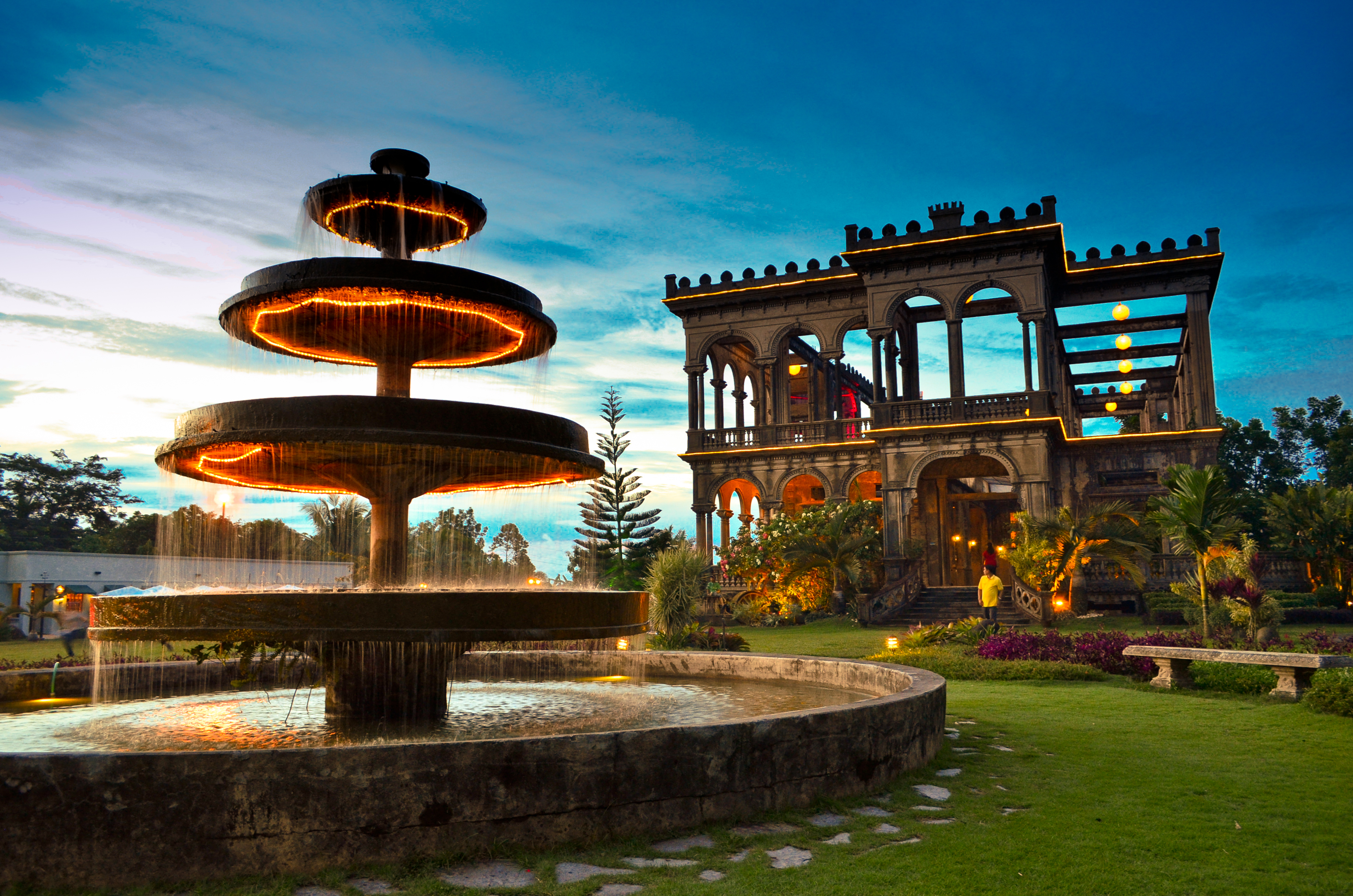
- View of The Ruins of the Mariano Ledesma Lacson Mansion, Talisay City at dusk

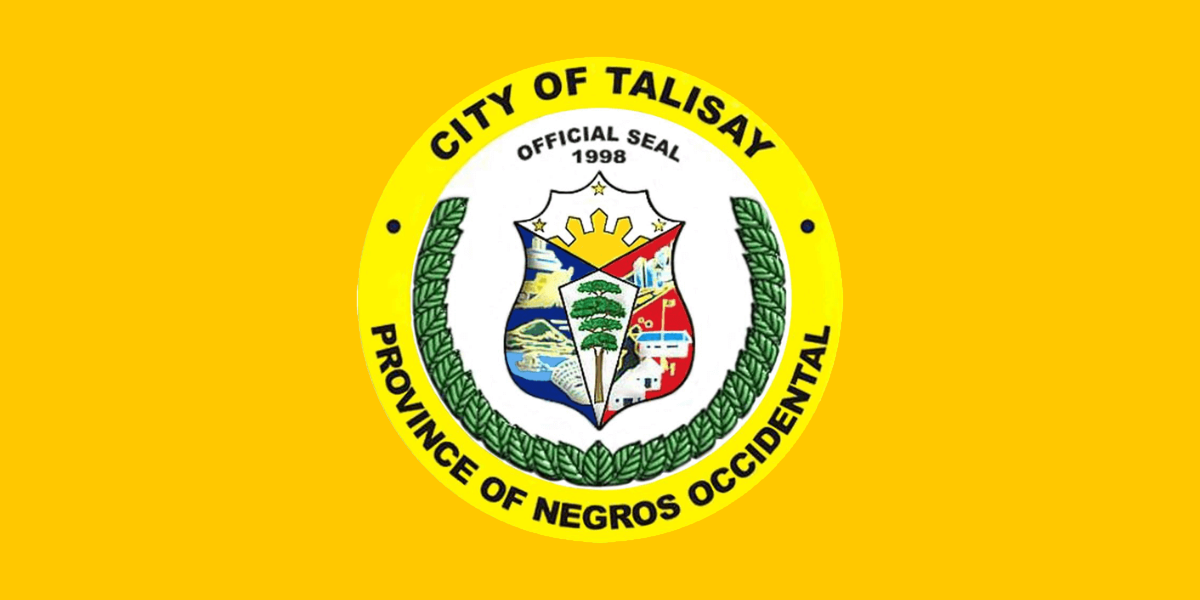
- Flag

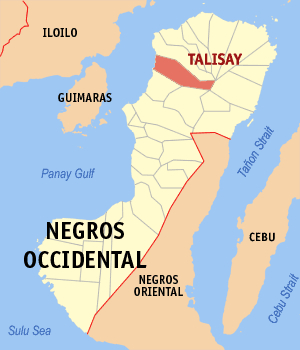
- Map of Negros Occidental with Talisay highlighted
- Interactive map of Talisay
- Location within the Philippines
- Coordinates: 10°44′N 122°58′E
- Country: Philippines
- Region: Negros Island Region
- Province: Negros Occidental
- District: 3rd district
- Founded: 1788
- Chartered: September 29, 1850
- Cityhood: February 11, 1998
- Named after: Terminalia catappa (locally called Talisay)
- Barangays: 27 (see Barangays)

Government
  - Type: Sangguniang Panlungsod
  - Mayor: Maria Rowena Guadalupe L. Lizares
  - Vice Mayor: Angel Gabriel C. Villacin (LP)
  - Representative: Javier Miguel L. Benitez (PFP)
  - City Council: Members: Emmanuel B. Ebro; Kenn Thomas P. Tirthdas; Martin Gerard C. Lizares; Stephen V. Siote; Maria Mercedes L. Ereñeta; Wolfgang H. Tuvilla; Felipe Martin Angelo F. Lacson III; Wilfred L. Malan; Joemarie M. Estelloso; Erlou P. Penado; Paul Leonard T. De Oca ^{‡}; Kurt Treyes ^{◌}; ‡ ex officio ABC president; ◌ ex officio SK chairman
  - Electorate: 68,472 voters (2025)

Area
  - Total: 201.18 km^{2} (77.68 sq mi)
- Elevation: 176 m (577 ft)
- Highest elevation: 2,413 m (7,917 ft)
- Lowest elevation: 0 m (0 ft)

Population (2024 census)
  - Total: 109,204
  - Density: 542.82/km^{2} (1,405.9/sq mi)
  - Households: 25,771

Economy
  - Income class: 3rd city income class
  - Poverty incidence: 20.01% (2023)
  - Revenue: ₱ 1,071 million (2023, 2024)
  - Assets: ₱ 3,254 million (2023, 2024)
  - Expenditure: ₱ 935.9 million (2024)
  - Liabilities: ₱ 955.5 million (2023, 2024)

Service provider
  - Electricity: Negros Electric and Power Corporation (NEPC)
- Time zone: UTC+8 (PST)
- ZIP code: 6115
- PSGC: 064528000
- IDD : area code: +63 (0)34
- Native languages: Hiligaynon; Tagalog
- Website: www.talisaycity.gov.ph

Talisay, officially the City of Talisay (Hiligaynon: Dakbanwa sang Talisay; Filipino: Lungsod ng Talisay), is a component city in the province of Negros Occidental, Philippines. According to the 2024 census, it has a population of 109,204 people.

The city is often confused with another Visayas city also named Talisay, which is a component city in the neighboring province of Cebu.

== History ==
=== Precolonial Period ===
Indigenous people settled in the cogon-lined lowlands of northwest Negros long before Spanish conquest. The settlement was called Minuluan, but was also known as Talisay by the province and neighboring communities in Panay. Its residents were either lowlanders or part of the Aetas who usually resided up in the highlands of northern Negros.

=== Spanish Colonial Period ===
The Augustinian Recollects arrived in Negros Island in 1848 and converted the settlement into a parish in 1849, separating it from Silay. Fray Fernando Cuenca, a Recollect and the town's parish priest from 1850 to his death in 1902, spearheaded the development of Minuluan's land into agricultural farms. The town became a monocrop farm for sugarcane, which eventually become the dominant cash crop in the whole of Negros Island.

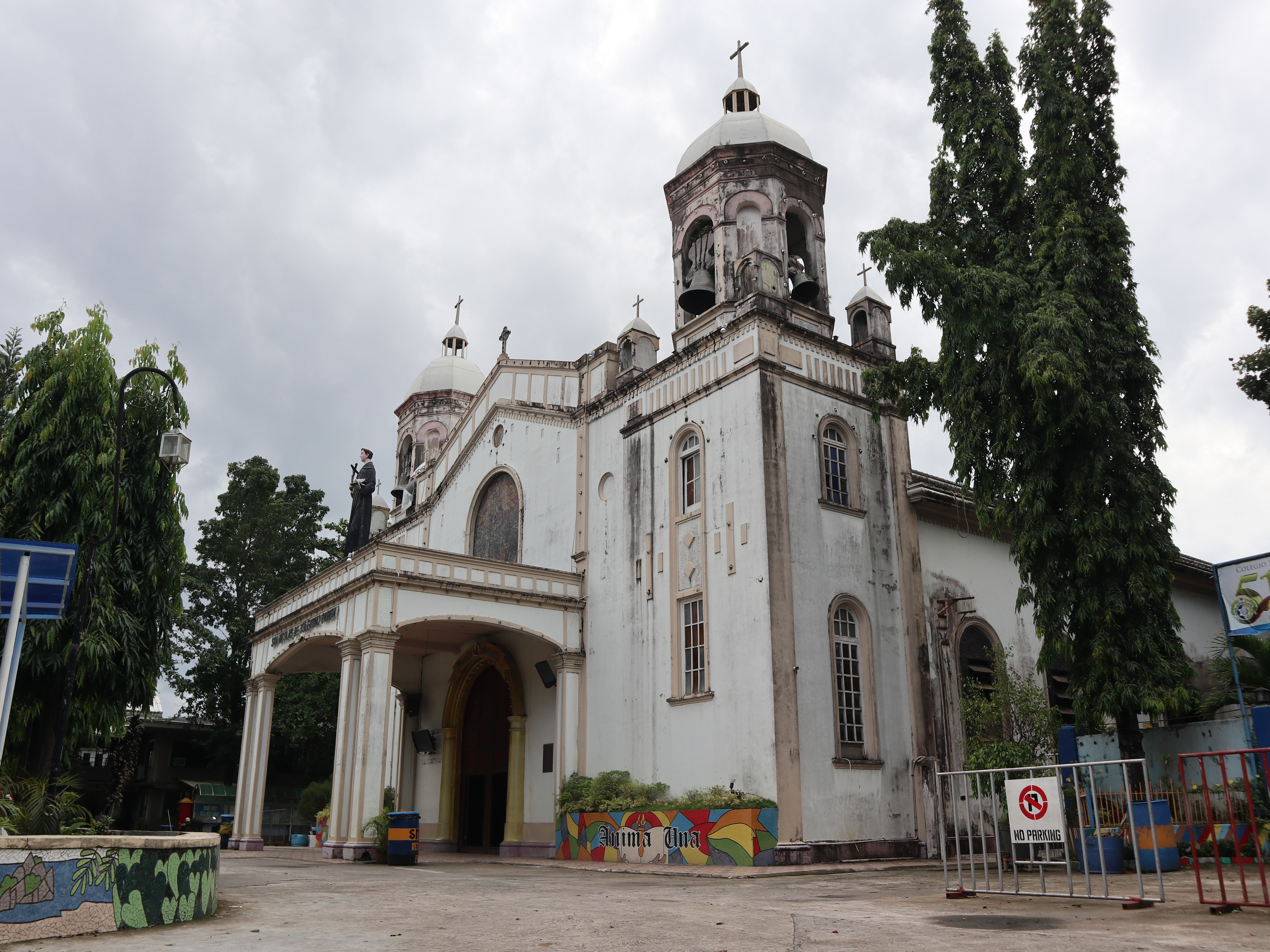

Negros Island's cheap land attracted settlers from Iloilo, Cebu and Bohol. Four major haciendas came to being: Minuluan, Bago, Bacolod and Silay. In 1850, these four haciendas produced 150 tons of sugar. Coupled with the opening of Iloilo Port to world trade, demand for sugar from Negros soared, and the island's sugar output continued to rise through the 1860s until the end of the century.

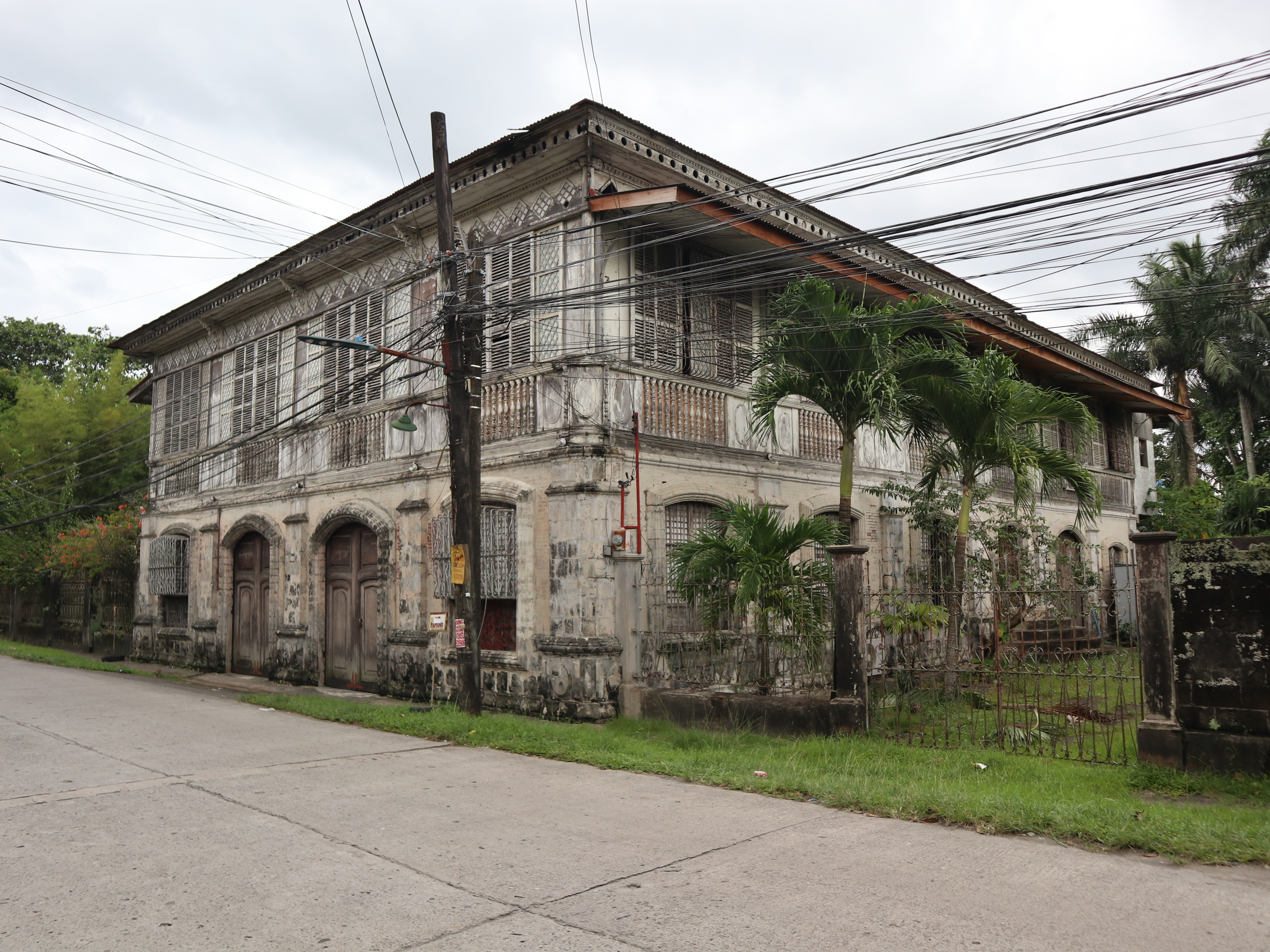
Tana Dicang House

With the sugar boom, the local hacienderos amassed great wealth and began to build extravagant homes for their families. Balay ni Tana Dicang of the Lizares clan is one of the first, and still-extant bahay na bato from this period, characterized by ground floors made from stone and second floor made from wood. It was built in 1872. In the early 1890s, the largest property owner in Minuluan was Isidro de la Rama with around 1,260 hectares of landholdings.

=== Philippine Revolution ===
During the Revolution, Minuluan became a battleground for Philippine independence. In November 3, 1898 the local hacienderos (landlords) of Negros banded together to revolt against the Spaniards. After two days of preparation, wealthy landowners and local leaders Aniceto Lacson led the troops north of Bacolod including Minuluan, while Juan Araneta of Bago led the troops south of Bacolod. They successfully ended Spanish control in the island, remarkably without much bloodshed. This also led to the establishment of the Republic of Negros. Today, the day of the revolt is called Cinco de Noviembre, and is a local holiday commemorated in Negros Island.

=== American Colonial Period ===
Around 1901, Minuluan was formally renamed Talisay, as it started to appear in US records of the war.

The local elementary school was established in 1912. It is now known as the Talisay South Elementary School.

Another local land baron, Don Mariano Ledesma, built a ten-room Italianate manor for his family in 1920. This became a local landmark renown for its luxurious exterior. During World War II, the American and Filipino forces torched the place, only leaving its concrete skeleton. While it was never restored to its original grandeur, it has been turned into a tourist attraction called The Ruins and has since become one of the most visited spots in Negros Occidental.

=== Postwar ===
In 1954, the Negros Occidental School of Arts and Trades was established in the town. Later on, this school will become the main campus of the Carlos Hilado Memorial State University.

Two years later, in 1956, A.S. Diaz Electric Service was founded to provide power, lighting and heating in Talisay and nearby Bacolod. It was eventually folded into CENECO in 1975.

A cholera pandemic hit Negros Island in 1961, starting explosively in Bacolod and Talisay.

=== Martial Law Period ===
The Visayas Technical Institute was established in Talisay in 1977. This is the precursor to the TUP Visayas.

Meanwhile, during the mid1970s, world prices of sugar collapsed as Western European and United States' demand for sugar fell. This, combined with a monopoly sponsored by the Marcos administration created a massive surplus of sugar, driving down prices further and devastating the economy of Negros island. In 1985, the sugar prices hit rock-bottom. Talisay was affected greatly and caused the closure of its sugar mills, including the Talisay-Silay Milling Co. (TASIMICO), in the late 1980s, displacing thousands of workers.

=== Contemporary ===
On February 11, 1998, by virtue of Republic Act No. 8489, Talisay was finally elevated into a city through the efforts of its local officials led by Mayor Amelo Lizares.

Located between Bacolod in the south and Silay with Bacolod Airport in the north, Talisay is experiencing spillover development. Real estate company Megaworld has now set up in the city, with Northill Gateway township, currently under construction.

Talisay is also positioning itself as a retail hub within Negros Occidental as well as a retirement haven for expats.

== Geography ==
Talisay City is 7 kilometres (4.3 mi) north of Bacolod, facing the Bacolod–Silay Access Road in the east. It is part of the metropolitan area called Metro Bacolod, which includes its neighbors, Silay to the north and Bacolod to the south. It has a total land area of 20,118 hectares (49,710 acres).

=== Barangays ===
Talisay City is politically subdivided into 27 barangays. Each barangay consists of puroks and some have sitios.

- Bubog
- Cabatangan
- Zone 4-A (Poblacion)
- Zone 4 (Poblacion)
- Concepcion
- Dos Hermanas
- Efigenio Lizares
- Zone 7 (Poblacion)
- Zone 14-B (Poblacion)
- Zone 12-A (Poblacion)
- Zone 10 (Poblacion)
- Zone 5 (Poblacion)
- Zone 16 (Poblacion)
- Matab-ang
- Zone 9 (Poblacion)
- Zone 6 (Poblacion)
- Zone 14 (Poblacion)
- San Fernando
- Zone 15 (Poblacion)
- Zone 14-A (Poblacion)
- Zone 11 (Poblacion)o
- Zone 8 (Poblacion)
- Zone 12 (Poblacion)
- Zone 1 (Poblacion)
- Zone 2 (Poblacion)
- Zone 3 (Poblacion)
- Katilingban

=== Climate ===
Climate data for Talisay
Month	Jan	Feb	Mar	Apr	May	Jun	Jul	Aug	Sep	Oct	Nov	Dec	Year
Mean daily maximum °C (°F)	28 (82)	29 (84)	30 (86)	32 (90)	31 (88)	30 (86)	29 (84)	30 (86)	29 (84)	29 (84)	29 (84)	28 (82)	30 (85)
Mean daily minimum °C (°F)	23 (73)	23 (73)	23 (73)	24 (75)	25 (77)	25 (77)	25 (77)	25 (77)	25 (77)	24 (75)	24 (75)	24 (75)	24 (75)
Average precipitation mm (inches)	120 (4.7)	87 (3.4)	95 (3.7)	97 (3.8)	187 (7.4)	263 (10.4)	251 (9.9)	220 (8.7)	227 (8.9)	268 (10.6)	220 (8.7)	158 (6.2)	2,193 (86.4)
Average rainy days	16.1	12.6	15.4	16.8	25.8	28.4	29.1	27.9	27.7	28.5	23.9	18.4	270.6
Source: Meteoblue

== Demographics ==
Population census of Talisay
Year	Pop.	±% p.a.
1903	14,548	—
1918	14,165	−0.18%
1939	40,547	+5.14%
1948	43,610	+0.81%
1960	46,308	+0.50%
1970	45,084	−0.27%
1975	48,518	+1.48%
1980	53,624	+2.02%
1990	63,260	+1.67%
1995	68,401	+1.47%
2000	79,146	+3.18%
2007	96,444	+2.76%
2010	97,571	+0.42%
2015	102,214	+0.89%
2020	108,909	+1.34%
2024	109,204	+0.06%
Source: Philippine Statistics Authority

== Economy ==
Poverty incidence of Talisay

Source: Philippine Statistics Authority

=== Business process outsourcing ===
In 2016, business process outsourcing (BPO) company iQor opened its call/contact center in Talisay, making it the first BPO company in the city.

== Education ==
Talisay is also known for its two major tertiary institutions: The Technological University of the Philippines – Visayas and Carlos Hilado Memorial State University, Main Campus. Talisay also has two private schools that offer K-12 Education which are the: Colegio San Nicolas de Tolentino-Recoletos and Notre Dame of Talisay City.

== Places of interest ==
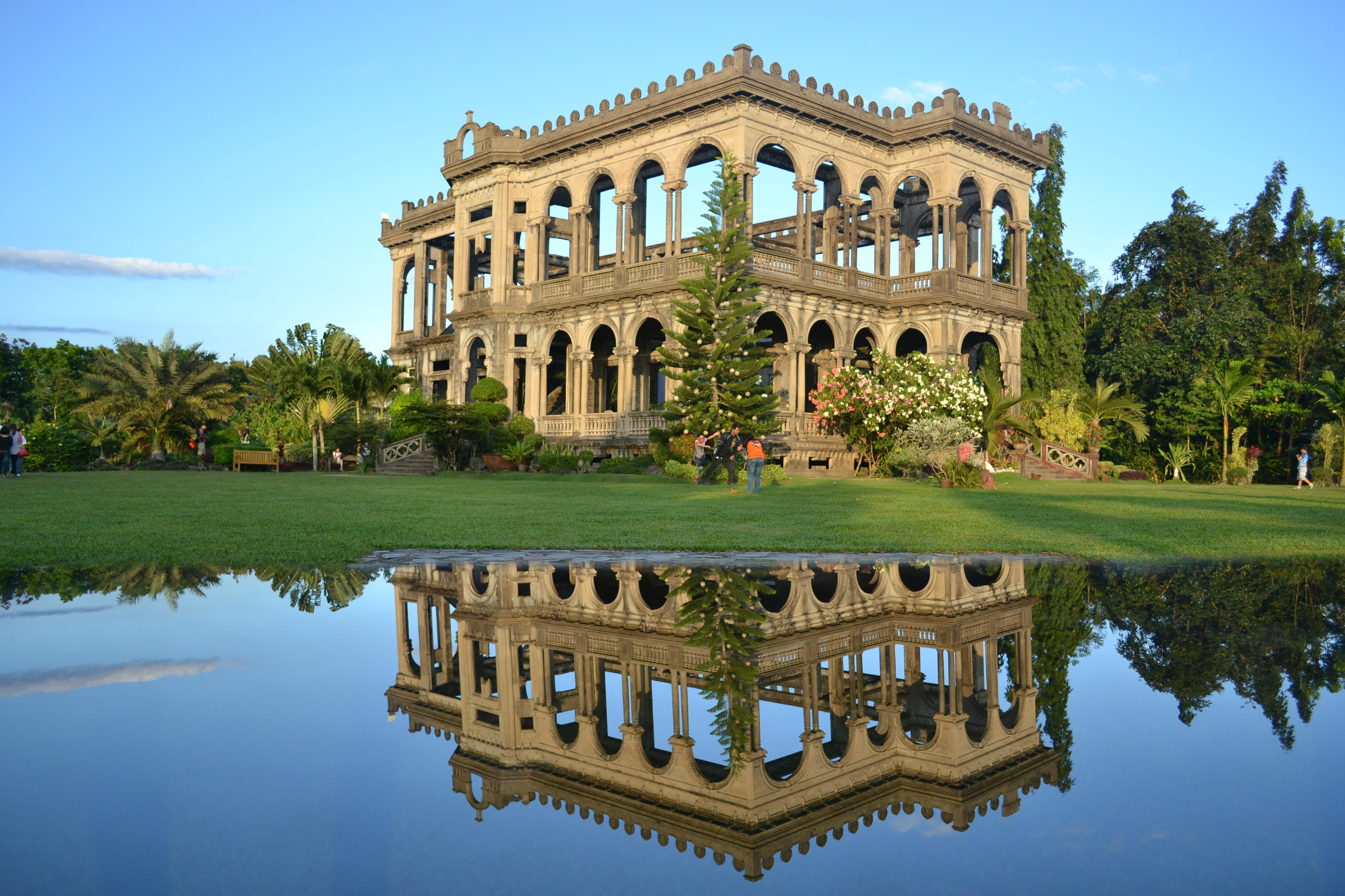
The Lacson Ruins, Iconic Philippine mansion and a popular tourist spot

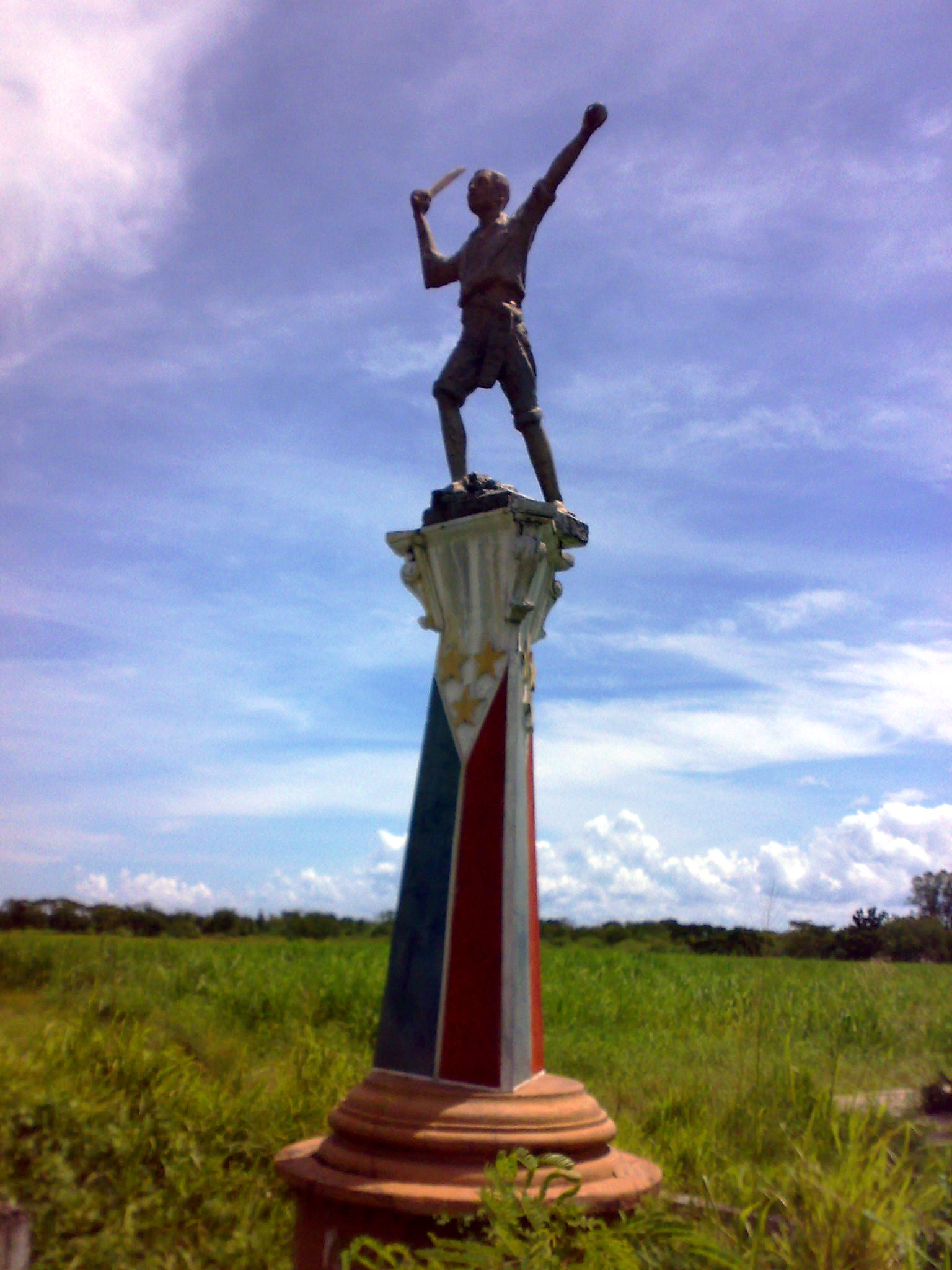
Statue of Andres Bonifacio

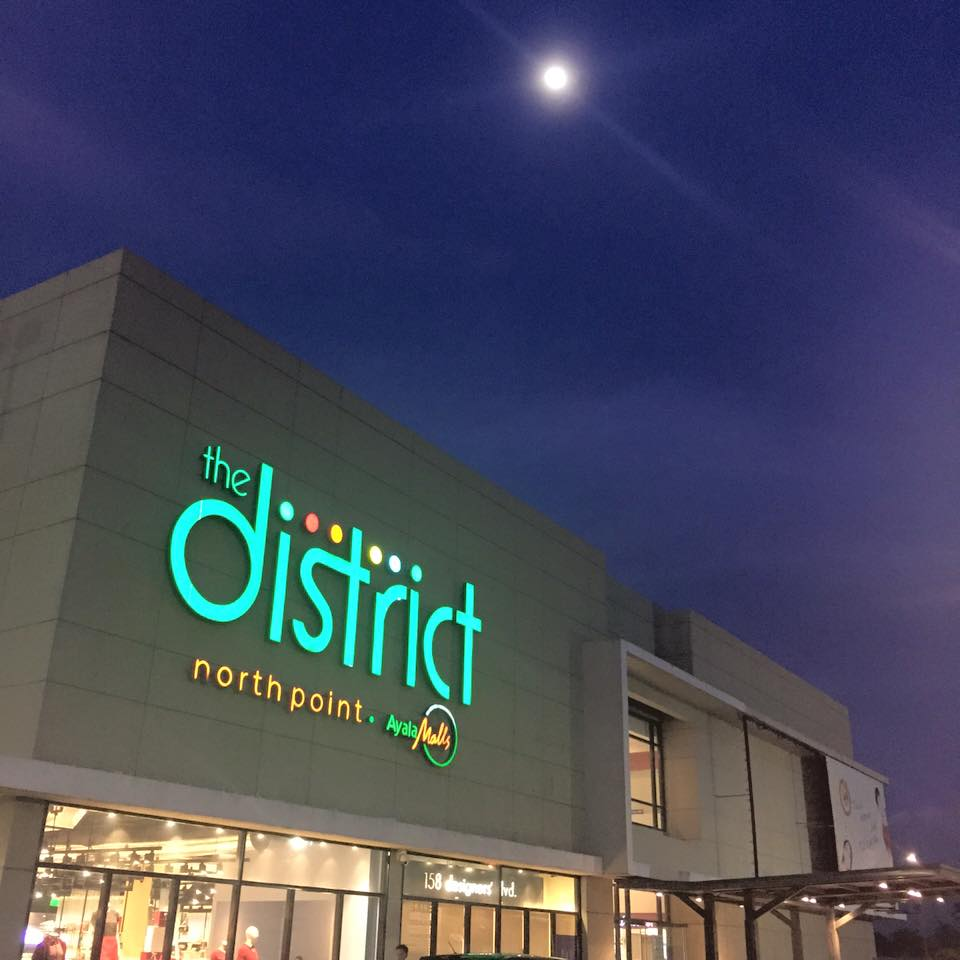
The District - North Point at Ayala North Point, is the major shopping place in the city

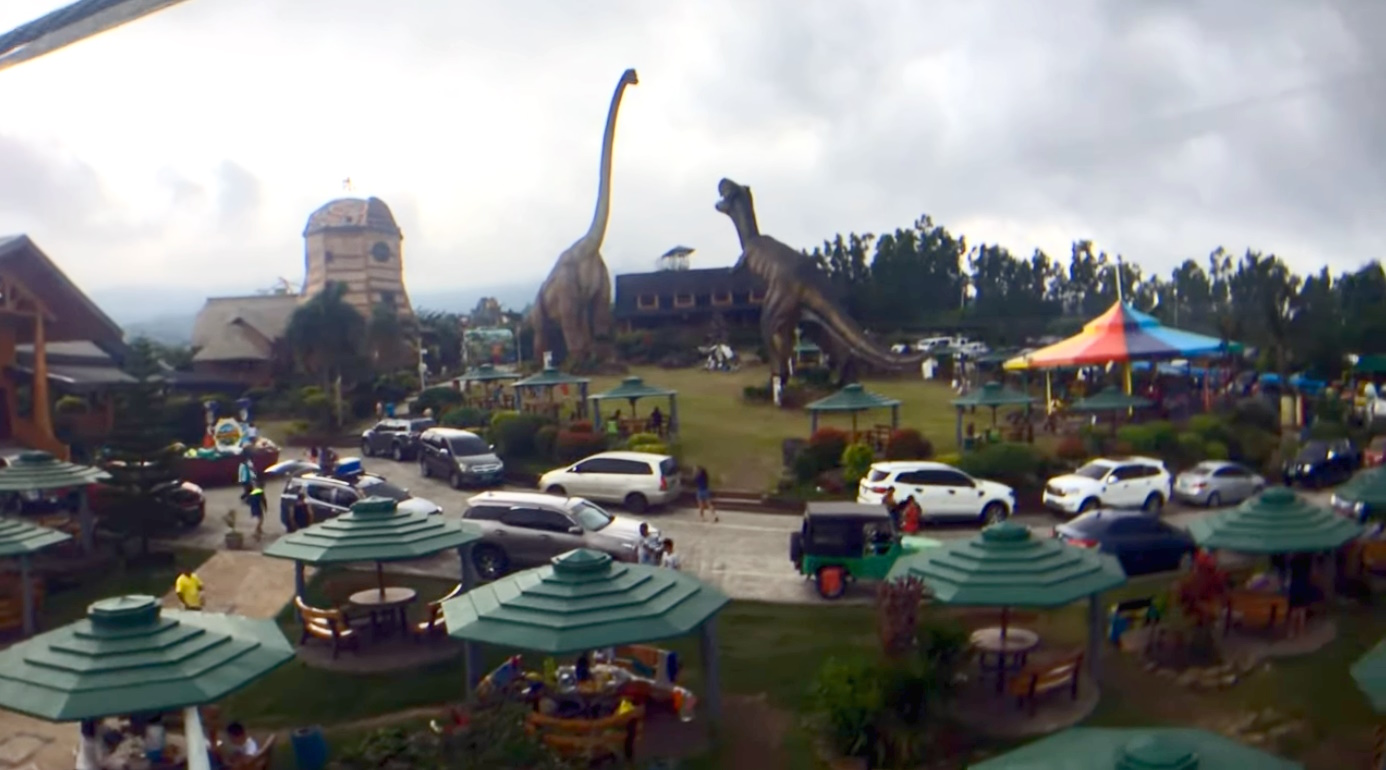
Campuestohan Highland Resort in Sitio Campuestohan, Barangay Cabatangan

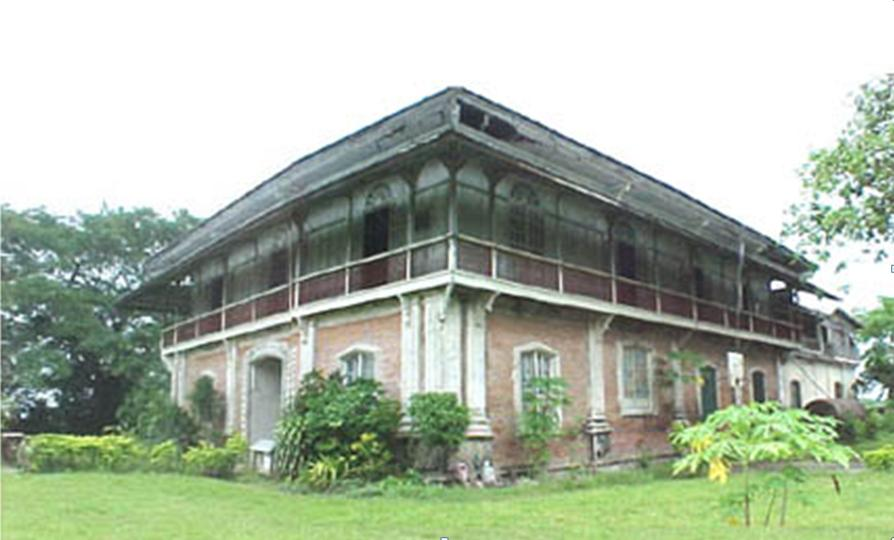
Aniceto Lacson House

== Notable Personalities ==
- Alfredo Alcala - Comic book artist for DC Comics and Marvel Comics
- Rafael Alunan Sr. - Secretary of Finance, Secretary of Agriculture and Commerce, Secretary of the Interior
- Rafael Alunan III - 5th Secretary of Tourism (Philippines), Secretary of the Interior and Local Government
- Jose Miguel Arroyo - First Gentleman of the Philippines as the husband of Gloria Macapagal Arroyo the 14th President of the Philippines
- Iggy Arroyo - member of the Philippine House of Representatives for the fifth district of Negros Occidental
- Carlos Balcells - Bass guitarist for rock band The Dawn
- Pedro Hernaez - Secretary of Commerce and Industry, Ambassador of the Philippines to Spain, Senator of the Philippines
- Reynel Hugnatan - Professional Basketball player and coach
- Celia Díaz Laurel - theatre actress, singer, painter, Second Lady of the Philippines as the wife of Salvador Laurel the 8th Vice President of the Philippines
- Denise Laurel - Singer, Film and Television actress
- Cocoy Laurel - Singer, Theater and Film actor
- Aniceto Lacson - Revolutionary, President of the Republic of Negros
- Arsenio Lacson - 17th Mayor of Manila, Member of the House of Representatives of the Philippines, Journalist, Member of the Philippine national football team
- Isaac Lacson - Senator of the Philippines, Member of the House of Representatives of the Philippines, 12th Governor of Negros Occidental
- Leo Ordiales - Volleyball player, member of the Philippines men’s national volleyball team
- Bernadeth Pons - Professional volleyball player at the Premier Volleyball League
- Vickie Rushton - model, beauty queen, winner Mutya ng Pilipinas International 2011 beauty pageant, housemate in Pinoy Big Brother: All In
- Camelo Tacusalme - Football player and manager, member of the Philippines national football team

== See also ==
- Metro Bacolod
- Bacolod
- Negros Revolution
