= Tana Dicang House =

- Balay ni Tana Dicang
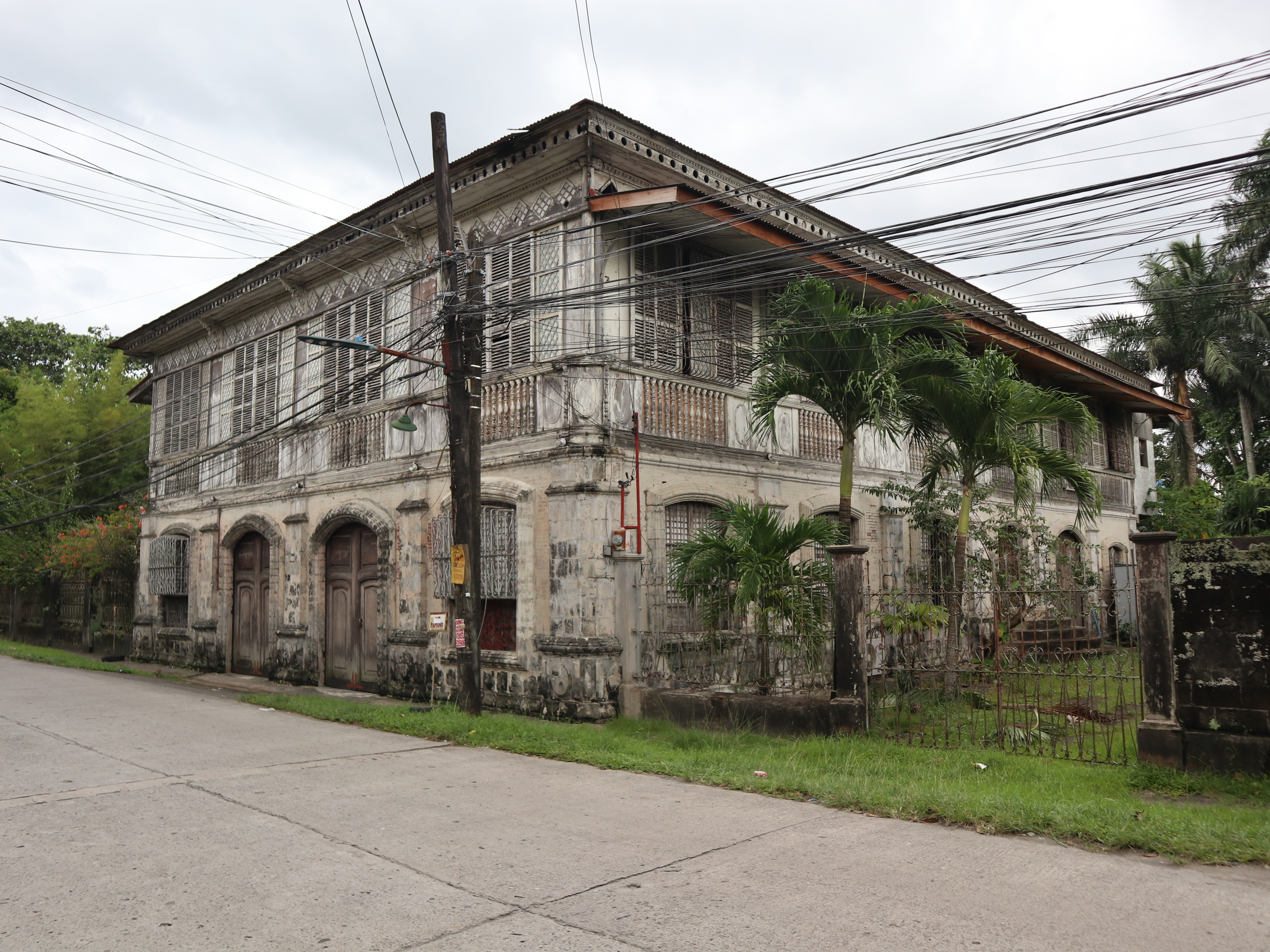
- Facade of Tana Dicang House

- Location in the Visayas Location in the Philippines
- Established: 1872
- Location: Talisay, Negros Occidental, Philippines
- Coordinates: 10°44′09″N 122°57′56″E
- Type: Lifestyle museum
- Curator: Adrian Lizares

The Tana Dicang House, also known as Balay ni Tana Dicang, is a historic house in the Spanish colonial era bahay na bato style in Talisay, Negros Occidental, Philippines. The house was named after its original female owner Enrica Lizares, nicknamed Dicang.

== History ==
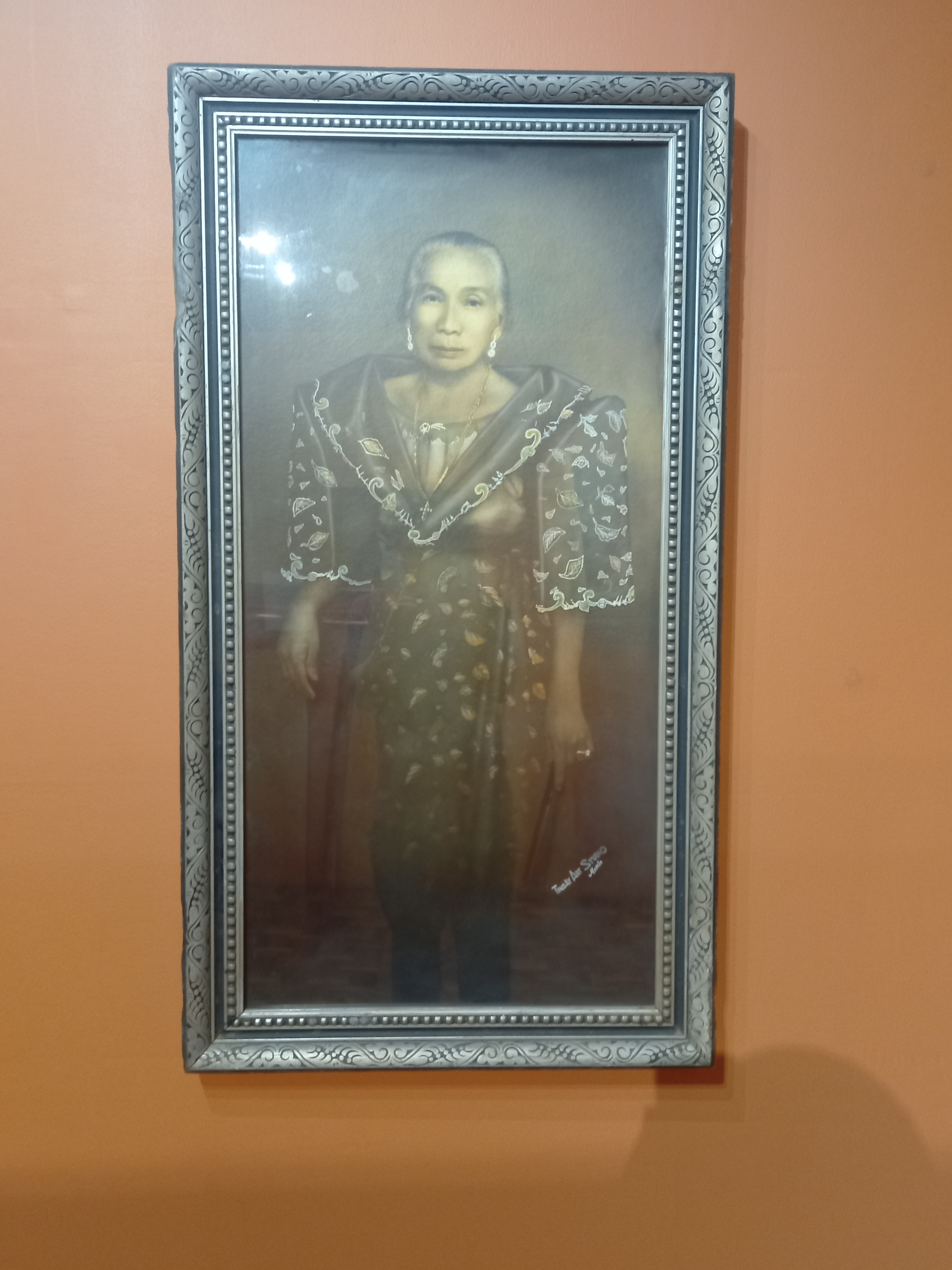
Portrait of Enrica Tana Dicang Lizares at the National Museum of Fine Arts

Built in 1872, the house was owned by Enrica "Dicang" Lizares and Captain Efigenio "Iniong" Lizares. The couple were among the wealthy sugar plantation owners of Negros Occidental. They had 16 children. Among her children were Simplicio Alunan Lizares, a former Mayor of Talisay, Negros Occidental, Dr. Antonio Alunan Lizares, former Governor of Negros Occidental and Emiliano Lizares the original owner of the Lizares Mansion in Jaro, Iloilo City. She was also the aunt of Rafael Alunan Sr. who served as Secretary of the Interior under President Manuel L. Quezon.

"Tana”, a shortened version of kapitana, refers to Dicang's status as a female community leader.

The house hosted several Philippine presidents when they visit Talisay, including Manuel Quezon and Serigio Osmena. In 2008, the house was converted into a lifestyle museum with an art gallery.

In 2023, the National Museum of the Philippines installed a historical marker to highlight the house's stature as an important cultural property.

== Architecture ==
The structure is an example of bahay na bato architecture, which stands on large wooden posts sunk into the ground. The house has wooden and stone walls with brick and coquina exteriors made from crushed shells and corals. It also used construction materials such as narra, balayong and molave.

The house has 18 rooms, including a living room, dining rooms, bed rooms, and kitchen.
