= Technological University of the Philippines – Cavite =

Public university in Cavite, Philippines

Technological University of the Philippines – Cavite Campus
- Teknolohikal na Unibersidad ng Pilipinas – Kampus ng Cavite (Filipino)
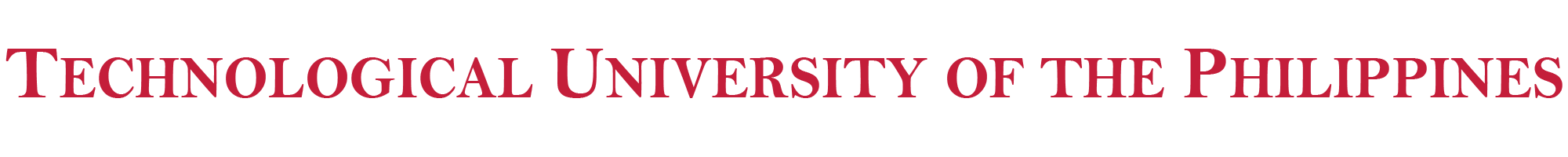
- Motto: Haligi ng Bayan
- Type: State university National university, Satellite campus
- Established: 1979
- Affiliations: ASAIHL, SCUAA, PISCUAA
- President: Dr. Reynaldo P. Ramos
- Director: Engr. Alexander E. Mag-isa, Ph.D., PME; Prof. Maria Cecilia N. Reyes (Asst. Dir. for Academic Affairs); Atty. Danilo M. Abayon (Asst. Dir. for Administration and Finance; Dr. Luis D. Dulnuan Jr. (Asst. Dir. for Research and Extension)
- Location: Carlos Trinidad Avenue, Salawag, Dasmariñas, Cavite, Philippines; 14°20′44″N 120°57′58″E
- Alma Mater song: TUP Hymn
- Colors: cardinal red and grey
- Nickname: TUPCians
- Mascot: Grey Hawk
- Website: www.tup.edu.ph
- Location in Luzon Location in the Philippines

Technological University of the Philippines – Cavite Campus (Filipino: Teknolohikal na Unibersidad ng Pilipinas – Kampus ng Cavite) is a satellite campus located at Salawag, Dasmariñas, Cavite. At present, TUP Cavite offers programs at pre-baccalaureate and baccalaureate levels. It was established in 1979 as one of the three prototype technician institutes in the Philippines.

== History ==
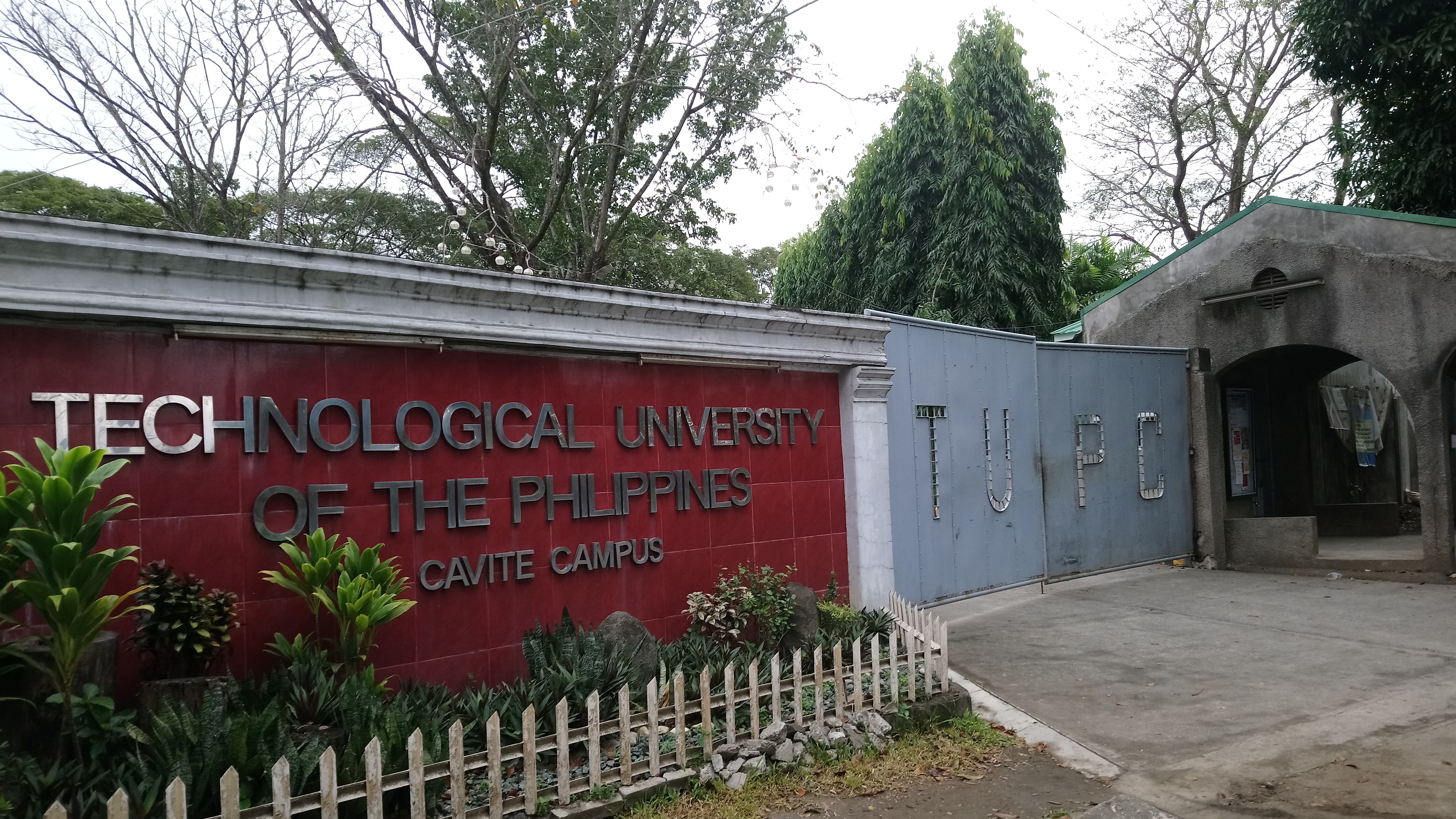
The main gate of the university

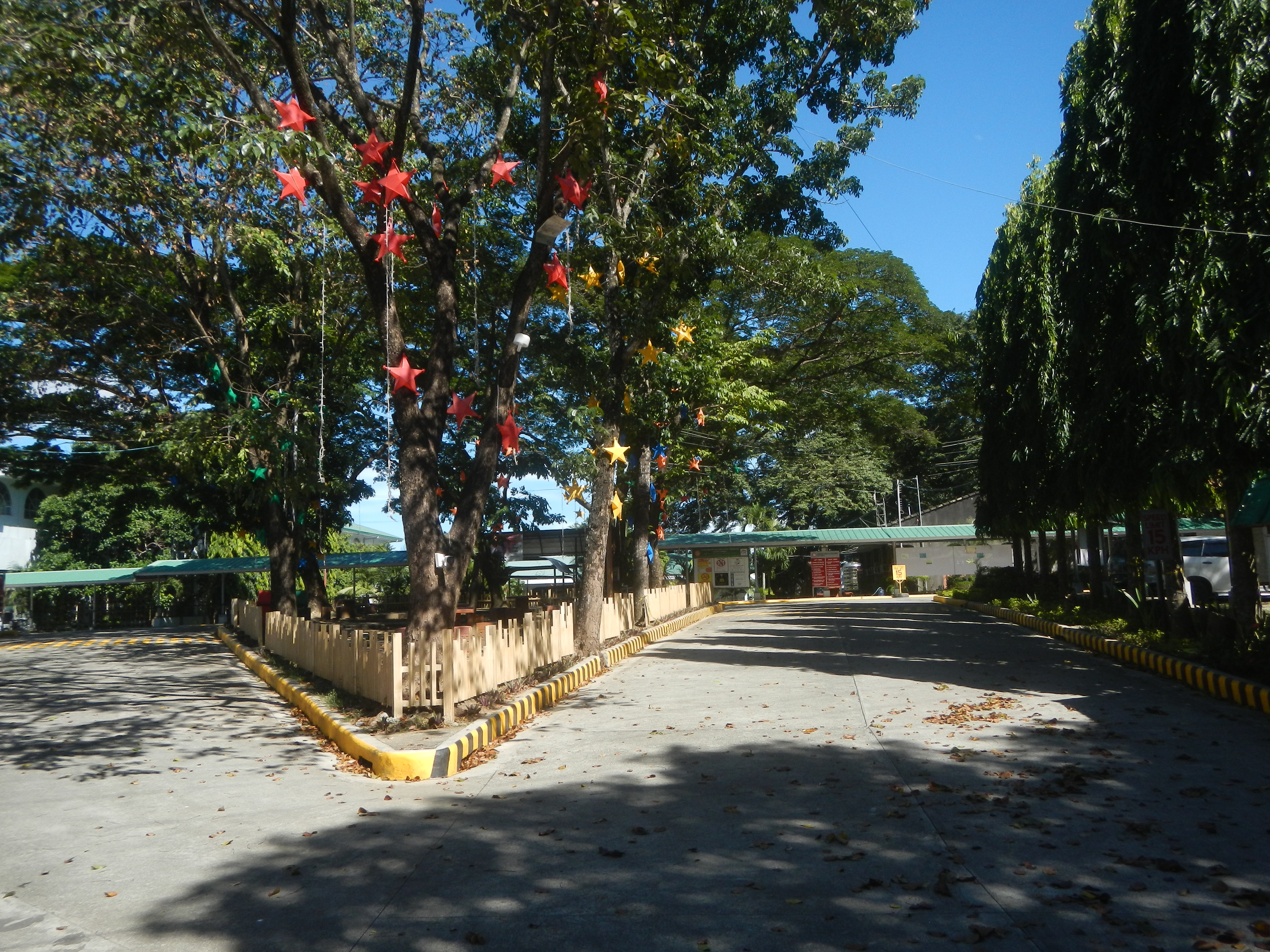
Interior, 2018

TUP-Cavite was established in 1979 in Salawag, Dasmariñas, Cavite donated by former senator and assemblywoman Helena Z. Benitez. The TUP-Cavite was created primarily to respond to the needs of the communities from Dasmariñas, Cavite for an affordable quality technology education.

In 1982, the TUP-Cavite officially started offering three-year engineering technology programs specializing in Automotive, Civil, Electrical, Electronics, Drafting, Mechanical and Stationery Marine. Today, the TUP - Cavite is a recognized center for higher learning in segments revolving around Technology education.

== Departments and academic programs ==
=== Departments ===
- Industrial Technology Department
- Industrial Education Department
- Engineering Department
- Mathematics, Physics, Chemistry Department
- Liberal Arts Department
- Physical Education Department
- OJT and Placement Department

=== Baccalaureate programs ===
- Bachelor of Science in Civil Engineering
- Bachelor of Science in Mechanical Engineering
- Bachelor of Science in Electrical Engineering
- Bachelor of Science in Industrial Education
- Bachelor of Technical Teacher Education
- Bachelor of Technology
- Bachelor of Engineering Technology

=== Majors ===
- Major in Automotive Technology
- Major in Civil Technology
- Major in Computer Engineering Technology
- Major in Electrical Technology
- Major in Electronics Engineering Technology
- Major in Mechanical and Production Engineering Technology
- Major in Power Plant Engineering Technology
