= Technological University of the Philippines Visayas =

Public university in Negros Occidental, Philippines

- Teknolohikal na Pamantasang Pilipinas sa Kabisayaan (Filipino)
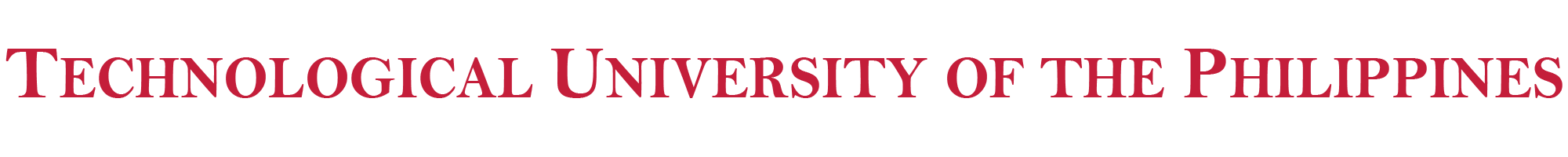
- Latin: Technologica Universitas Philippinarum
- Former name: Visayas Technician Institute (1977–1985)
- Motto: Haligi ng Bayan
- Type: Satellite campus Public Nonsectarian higher education institution
- Established: 1977; 49 years ago
- Academic affiliations: ASAIHL, SCUAA, PISCUAA
- President: Jesus Rodrigo F. Torres
- Director: Eric Malo-oy
- Location: Talisay, Negros Occidental, Philippines; 10°44′22″N 122°58′11″E
- Hymn: TUP Hymn
- Colors: Red & grey
- Nickname: TUPVians
- Mascot: Grey Hawk
- Website: www.tupvisayas.edu.ph
- Location in the Visayas Location in the Philippines

The Technological University of the Philippines (TUP) Visayas is a state higher education institution in Talisay City, Negros Occidental. It was established in 1977 as one of the three prototype technician institutes/projects of the National Government. TUP Visayas was then known as the Visayas Technician Institute (VTI).

In 1978, the Philippine College of Arts and Trades (PCAT) in Manila was converted into the Technological University of the Philippines (TUP) and was designated as the apex of technology education. Accordingly, the VTI was placed under the management of the TUP. In 1985, the VTI was renamed the Technological University of the Philippines Visayas.

Currently, the TUP Visayas is one of the top providers of engineering graduates in the country, producing topnotchers in the Professional Licensure Examination given by the Professional Regulation Commission (PRC).

TUP Visayas is located in Talisay City with extension campuses in Sagay City and Cadiz.

== Curricular programs ==
Graduate program

- Master of Technology (MT)

Baccalaureate programs

- Bachelor of Science in Electrical Engineering (BSEE)
- Bachelor of Science in Computer Engineering (BSCpE)
- Bachelor of Science in Electronics Engineering (BSECE)
- Bachelor of Science in Mechanical Engineering (BSME)
- Bachelor of Science in Chemistry (BSChem)
- Bachelor of Science in Mechatronics Engineering (BSMXE)
- Bachelor of Science in Instrumentation and Control Engineering (BSICE)
- Bachelor of Technology in Mechatronics Technology (BTMT)
- Bachelor of Engineering Technology (BET)
  - Major in Automotive Engineering Technology (AET)
  - Major in Chemical Engineering Technology (ChET)
  - Major in Computer Engineering Technology (CoET)
  - Major in Electrical Engineering Technology (EET)
  - Major in Electro-Mechanical Engineering Technology (EMT)
  - Major in Electronics Engineering Technology (ECET)
  - Major in Manufacturing Engineering Technology (MET)
  - Major in Heating, Ventilation, Air-conditioning and Refrigeration Engineering Technology (HVAC-RET)
