= 500 Years of Christianity in the Philippines =

Christian anniversary in the Philippines

- Date: April 4, 2021 – April 22, 2022
- Location: Primarily in the Philippines (some events held outside the country)
- Type: Series of commemorations
- Theme: "Gifted to Give" (Matthew 10:8)
- Organized by: Catholic Bishops' Conference of the Philippines
- Website: 500yoc.com

The 500 Years of Christianity in the Philippines (500 YOC) was a quincentennial observed in the Philippines. It was held from April 4, 2021, to April 22, 2022, to commemorate the introduction of Christianity in the Philippines in 1521 when the Magellan expedition made a stopover in the islands.

== Background ==
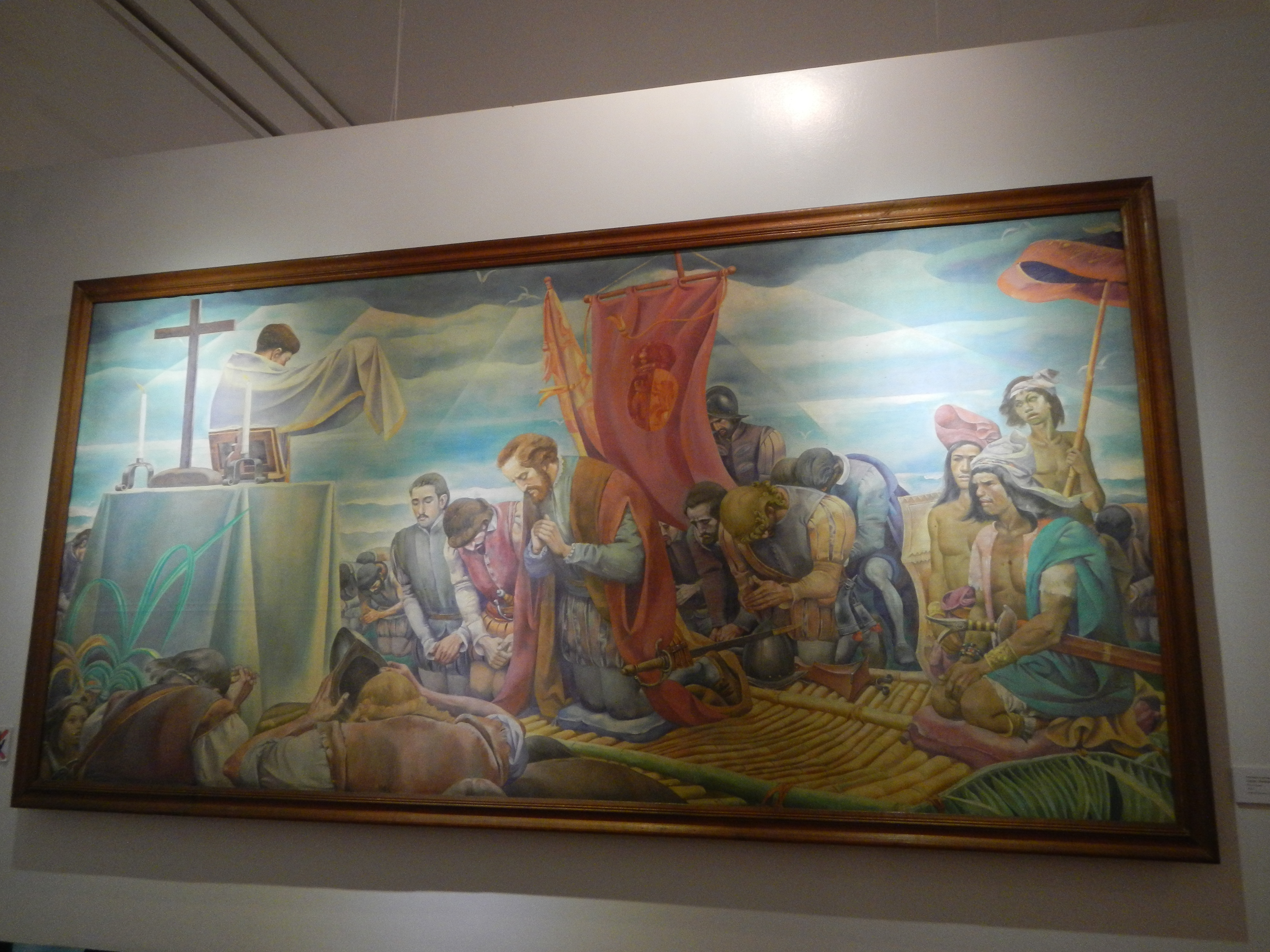
Artistic depiction of the Mass at Limasawa by Botong Francisco

The 500 Years of Christianity in the Philippines celebrations was part of the larger 2021 Quincentennial Commemorations in the Philippines (2021 QCP) event organized by the Philippine government. The Philippine national government aims to commemorate the 500th anniversary of the Filipinos' first contact with the Spanish in 1521 from a Filipino-centric point of view in 2021. The National Quincentennial Committee (NQC) was formed for this purpose in May 2018, when President Rodrigo Duterte issued Executive Order (EO) No. 55. On January 28, 2019, President Duterte issued EO 103 formalizing the intent for the commemorations to be "Filipino-centric" and expanded the membership and scope of the NQC.

The full name of the event commemorating the introduction of Christianity in the Philippines is "500th anniversary of the introduction of Christianity in the Philippines"

The Catholic Bishops' Conference of the Philippines (CBCP) was the lead organizer of the quincentennial of the introduction of the Christianity in the Philippines. CBCP President Bishop Pablo Virgilio David rejects the notion that celebrating the 500th anniversary of the introduction of the Philippines as also celebrating the Spanish colonization of the islands citing continued prevalence of the religion long after colonization and asserts that Filipino ancestors were "intelligent enough" to accept what is good and reject what is evil among the introductions made by the Spanish in the Philippines.

Despite the COVID-19 pandemic, the commemorations were still held albeit modified to comply with protocols imposed in response to the health crisis. Although about 50 projects related to the quincentennial were either canceled or indefinitely postponed.

== Marketing ==
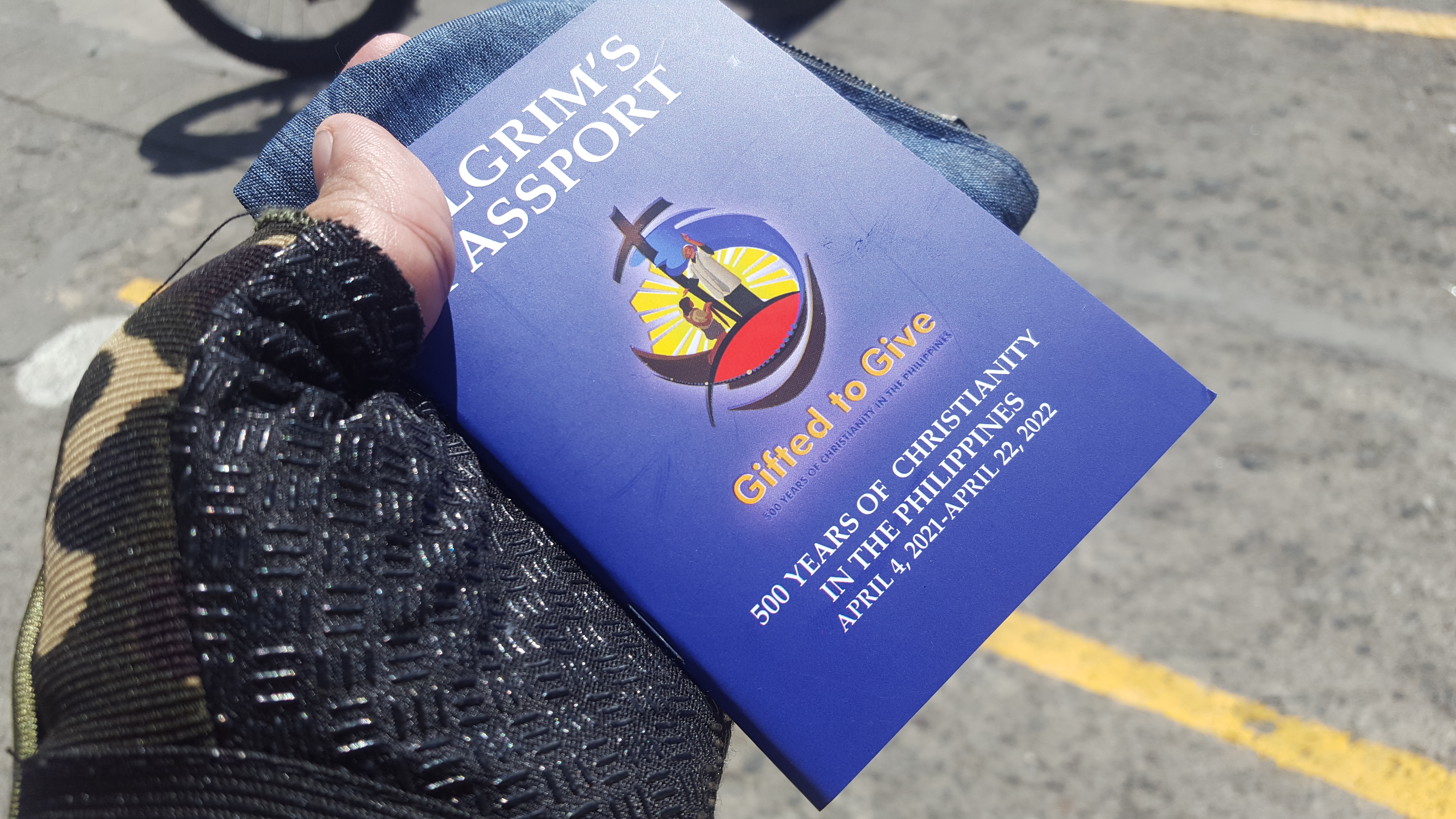
Pilgrim's Passport of the Diocese of Antipolo

The Catholic Bishops' Conference of the Philippines (CBCP) adopted the event's theme and logo on September 18, 2019. The theme is "Gifted to Give" was derived from Matthew 10:8. The logo used various elements such as a cross, a ship, the sun, a rosary. The logo depicts a ship with a cross as its mast with the central figure derived from First Baptism in the Philippines painting of Fernando Amorsolo. The logo was designed by Edilberto Dionio, a theology student.

== Events ==
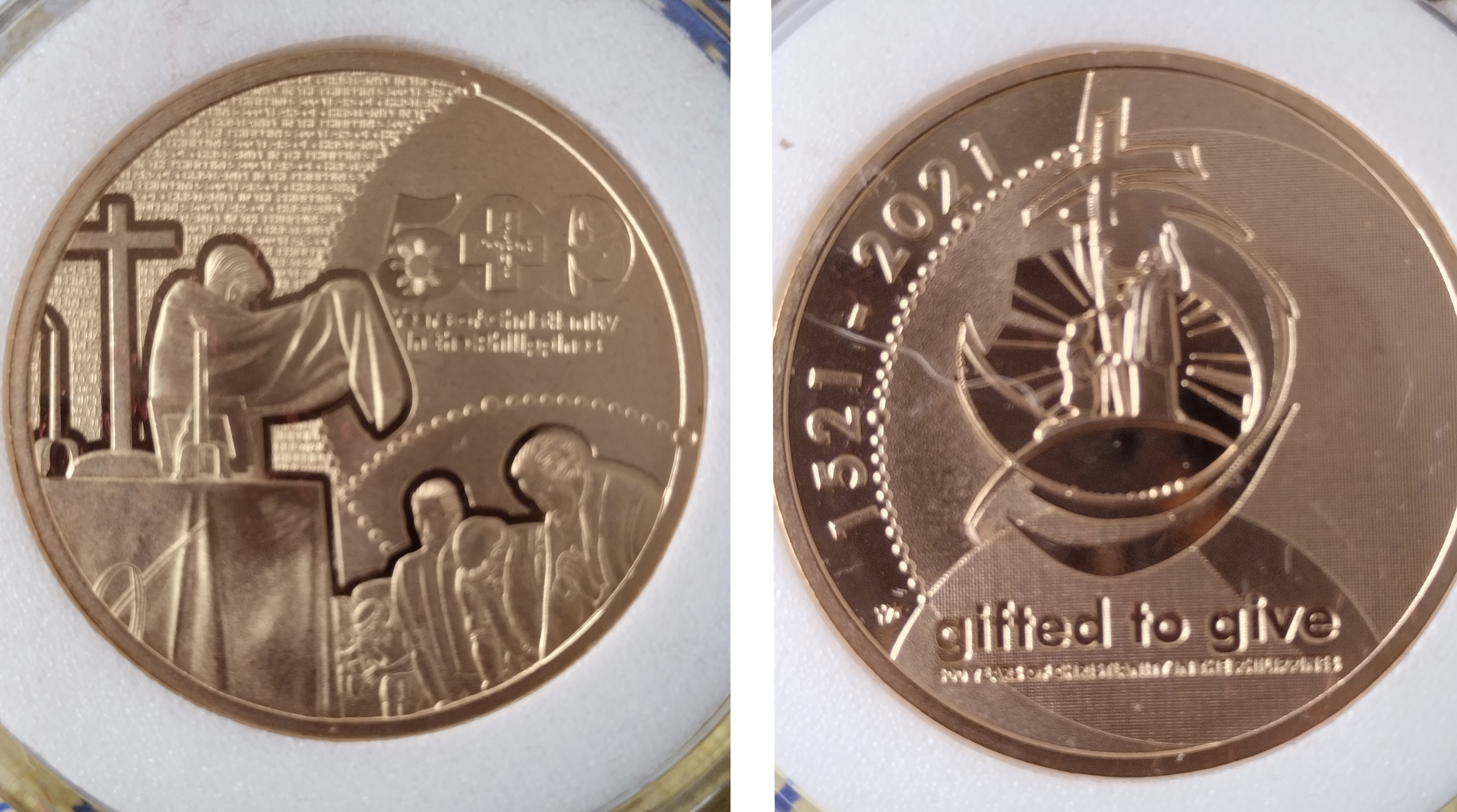
Commemorative medal

The commemoration of the introduction of Christianity in the Philippines was supposed to culminate in April 2021 but was changed to be the kickoff month of the observances due to the COVID-19 pandemic. As a result some events were held in 2022.

- December 1, 2019 – 500-day countdown to the 500 Years of Christianity (YOC) event starts.
- September 26, 2020 – Social media launch of the 500 Years of Christianity (YOC) event.
- January 5, 2021 – A temporary artwork made from solar-powered light bulbs was installed encompassing the Agrifina Circle and Relief Map at the Rizal Park. The artwork made under the non-profit Liter of Light is in a form of a rosary and the bulbs will be donated after the event.
- February 25, 2021 – Pope Francis granted until April 22, 2022, plenary indulgences to pilgrims visiting the 537 churches in the Philippines designated as Jubilee Churches.
- March 14, 2021 – Pope Francis presided a mass at the St. Peter's Basilica in Vatican City as part of the quincentennial.
- March 31, 2021 – Commemoration of the first Mass in the Philippines.
- April 4, 2021 – Official kickoff of the quincentennial celebrations, coinciding with Easter Sunday.
- April 14, 2021 – Commemoration of the first Christian baptism in the Philippines in Cebu City. A re-enactment of the event saw 500 people with special needs baptized.

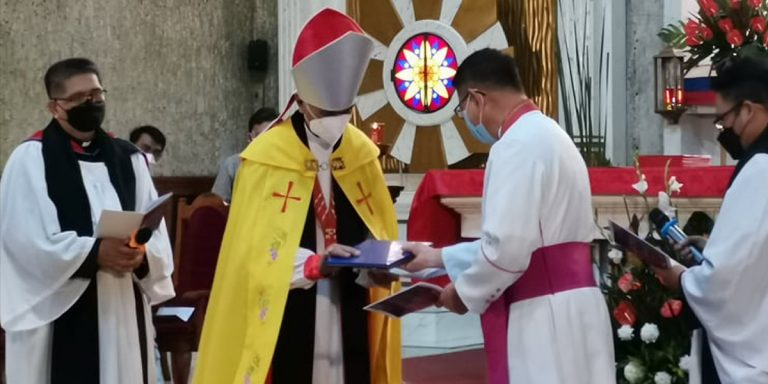
Leaders of the CBCP and Philippine Independent Church (IFI) during the signing of their mutual agreement and recognition amidst their diversity, as part of celebrating 500 years of Christianity in the Philippines in 2021, held at the IFI National Cathedral. Seen in the photo is then-Supreme Bishop Rhee Timbang presenting the IFI's liturgical book to CBCP representatives.

- August 3, 2021 – The Philippine Catholic Church signed two joint statements with the Philippine Independent Church (Iglesia Filipina Independiente or IFI) "for a more ecumenical cooperation amidst diversity", with the first statement as "Celebrating the Gift of Faith, Learning from the Past, and Journeying Together" and the second as a "Mutual Recognition of Baptisms between the IFI and the Roman Catholic Church in the Philippines". The liturgical launching of the two documents was held at the Iglesia Filipina Independiente National Cathedral.
- April 24, 2022 – Conclusion of the quincentennial celebrations, coinciding with Divine Mercy Sunday.

=== Canceled ===
- August 4–6, 2021 – National Retreat for the Clergy.

== See also ==
- Philippine Centennial
- Iglesia ni Cristo Centennial
- 2016 International Eucharistic Congress
