= Joel Porlares =

Filipino bishop (born 1961)

The Most Reverend Joel Porlares, Obispo Maximo XIV
- Fourteenth Supreme Bishop of the Philippine Independent Church
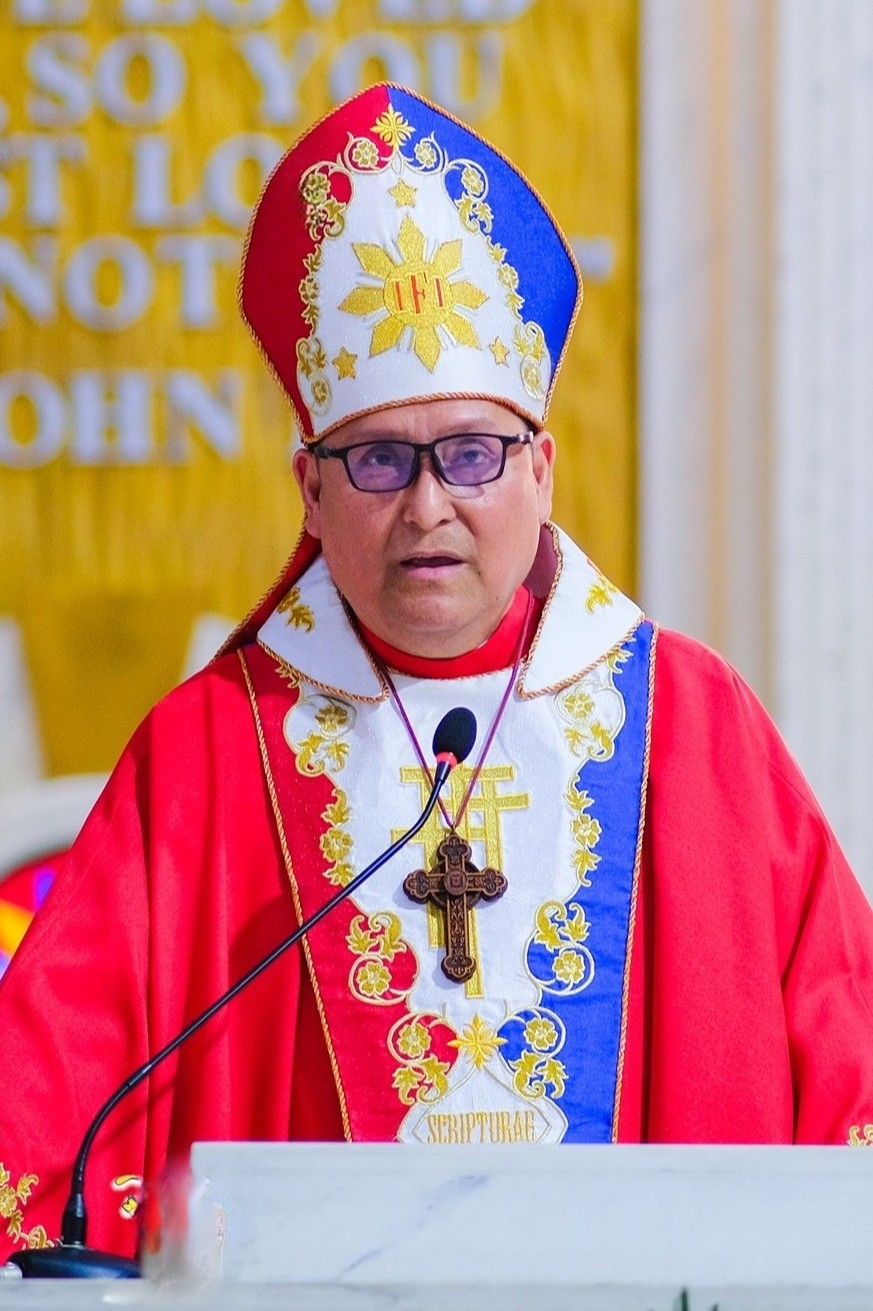
- Porlares in 2025
- Church: Philippine Independent Church
- See: Manila
- Appointed: 9 May 2023
- Installed: 29 June 2023
- Predecessor: Rhee Timbang
- Successor: Incumbent
- Previous posts: IFI General Secretary (2017–2023); IFI Diocesan Bishop of Bataan and Bulacan (2013–2017)

Orders
- Ordination: September 1984 (Priesthood)
- Consecration: July 25, 2013 (Episcopate) by Ephraim Fajutagana

Personal details
- Born: Joel Ocop Porlares; January 1, 1961 (age 65) Tacloban, Leyte, Philippines
- Denomination: Aglipayan (Philippine Independent Church/Iglesia Filipina Independiente)
- Residence: Metro Manila; Bulacan
- Spouse: Rowena C. Porlares
- Children: 3
- Education: Saint Andrew’s Theological Seminary (BTh and MDiv); University of Santo Tomas (JCL)
- Coat of arms
- Styles
- Reference style: His Eminence
- Spoken style: Your Eminence
- Religious style: Obispo Máximo XIV; The Most Reverend

Joel Ocop Porlares is the current and fourteenth Obispo Máximo or Supreme Bishop of the Philippine Independent Church (Iglesia Filipina Independiente or IFI) since June 2023.

Porlares was the church's General Secretary, the second highest post in the church, from June 2017 to June 2023. He was elected Obispo Máximo, the highest post of the church, during the 15th General Assembly, the highest policy-making body of the church, on May 9, 2023.

== Early life and education ==
Porlares was born in Tacloban, Leyte, on January 1, 1961, and was raised in Basey, Samar. His father was a priest of the IFI in Samar.

Porlares graduated with a bachelor's degree in theology from Saint Andrew's Theological Seminary (SATS) in Quezon City in 1984, and obtained his master's degree in divinity from the same institution in 1989. He also took a Licentiate of Canon Law at the University of Santo Tomas which he completed in 2003.

== Early ministerial roles ==
Porlares was involved in the programs of the Christian Conference of Asia (CCA) since his youth and participated in the Asia Youth Assembly (1984) organised by the CCA, which was held in New Delhi, India, as well as in other CCA Youth Programs in the late 1980s including one in 1986.

He was the program coordinator of the Bataan Ecumenical Council and the regional program coordinator of the Central Luzon Ecumenical Council of the National Council of Churches in the Philippines (NCCP) in 1987 and 1988, respectively.

== Ecclesiastical roles ==
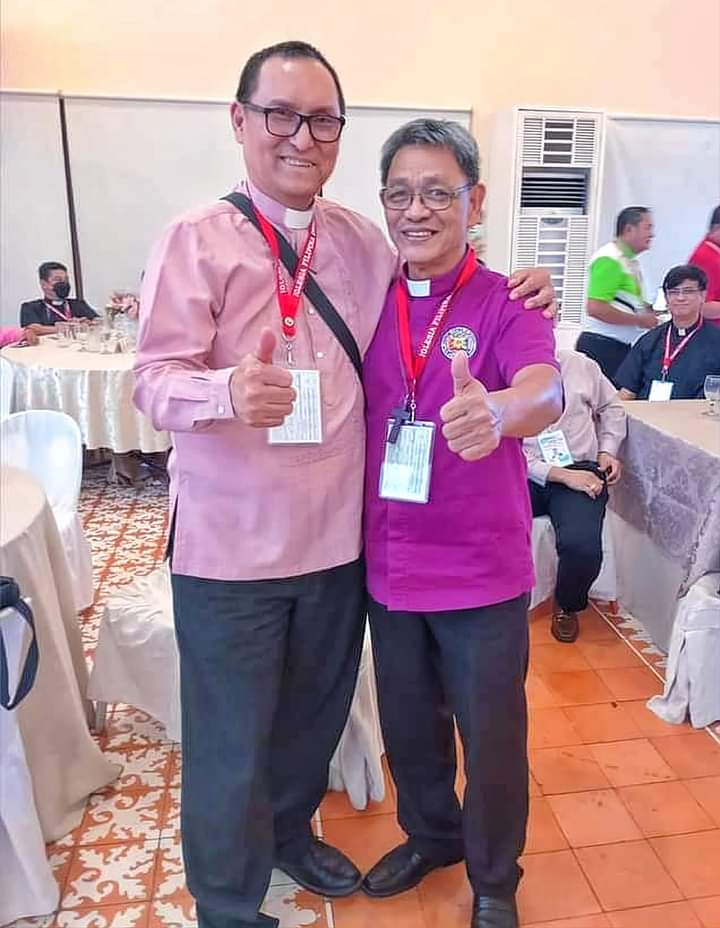
Porlares (left) with the Right Reverend Felixberto "Bert" L. Calang (right), Diocesan Bishop of Cagayan de Oro, during the 15th IFI General Assembly in May 2023 held at the Mella Hotel, Las Piñas City.

Porlares was ordained to the priesthood in September 1984. He served as a priest in the Dioceses of Greater Manila Area, Western Pangasinan, and Bataan and Bulacan, where he eventually became the diocesan bishop.

He taught Canon Law and Church History at the Aglipay Central Theological Seminary (ACTS) in Urdaneta, Pangasinan, where he served as its academic coordinator in 1996 to 1999, and at St. Andrew's Theological Seminary in Quezon City.

He is also the vice-chairperson of the National Council of Churches in the Philippines (NCCP) since 2019.

He was elected General Secretary of IFI in May 2017. He was elevated to Obispo Máximo on June 29, 2023, and succeeded Rhee Timbang after getting elected on May 9, 2023. Delegates to the 15th General Assembly, held at the Mella Hotel in Las Piñas, elected Porlares via majority votes after garnering 165 votes in contrast to the 117 votes of his closest contender, Felixberto Calang, diocesan bishop of Cagayan de Oro.

On June 29, 2023, the Feast of Saints Peter and Paul, Porlares was installed as the 14th Obispo Máximo at the Iglesia Filipina Independiente National Cathedral of the Holy Child which was also attended by the IFI's ecumenical partner and concordat churches, including representatives from the Roman Catholic Church.

== Personal life ==
Porlares is married and has three sons. He is a member of the Freemasonry's Grand Lodge of the Philippines.

Aglipayan Church titles
Preceded by Rhee Timbang	Supreme Bishop of the Philippine Independent Church; 29 June 2023 – present	Succeeded by Incumbent
