= Ephraim Fajutagana =

Filipino bishop (born 1951)

The Most Reverend Ephraim Fajutagana, Obispo Maximo XII D.D.
- Twelfth Supreme Bishop of the Philippine Independent Church
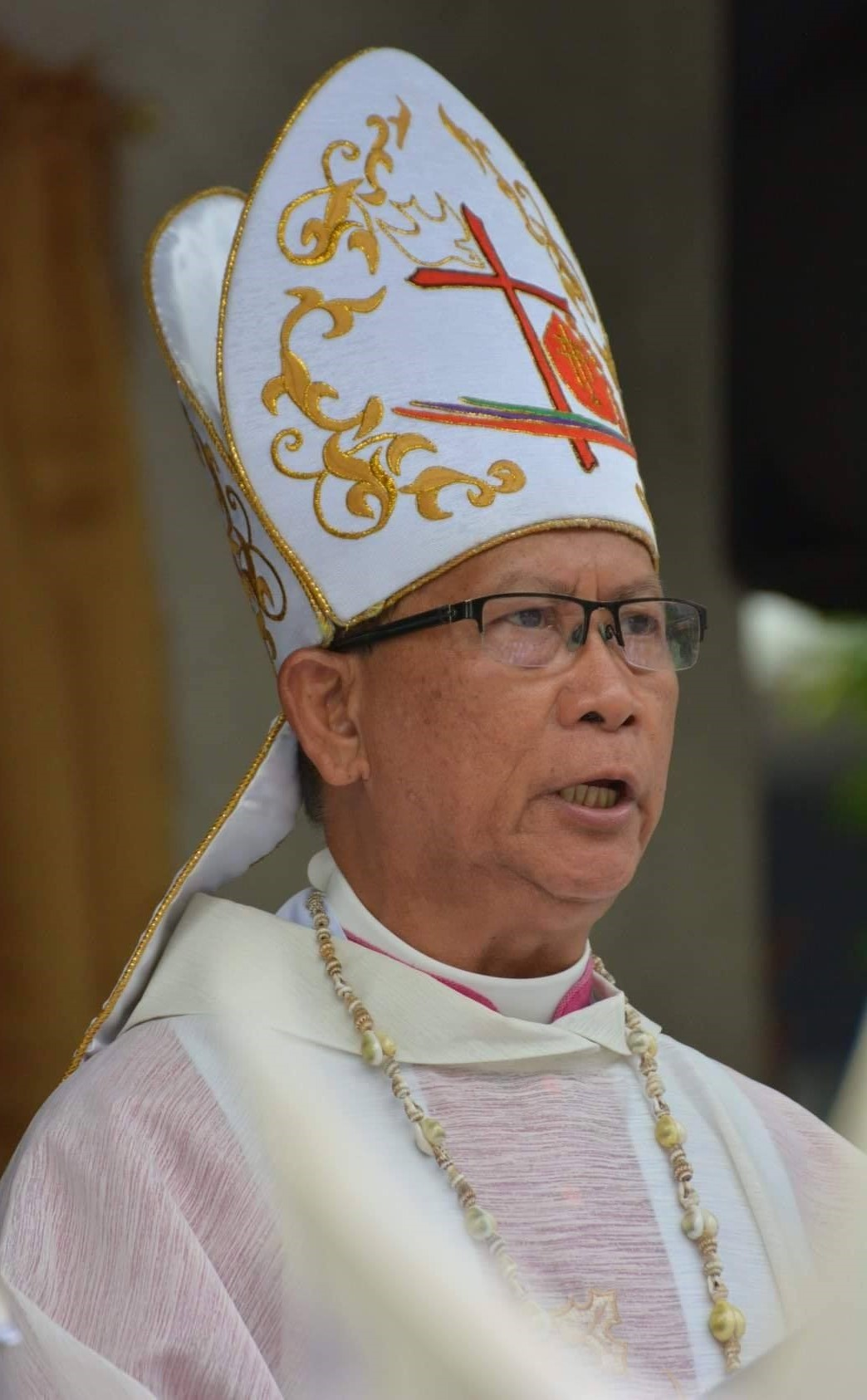
- Bishop Ephraim Fajutagana, circa 2019
- Church: Philippine Independent Church
- See: Manila
- Appointed: 10 May 2011
- Installed: 11 June 2011
- Term ended: 25 June 2017
- Predecessor: Godofredo J. David
- Successor: Rhee Timbang
- Other posts: IFI Diocesan Bishop of Iloilo (2017–2021)
- Previous posts: IFI General Secretary (2005–2011); IFI Diocesan Bishop of Cavite (2002–2005)

Orders
- Ordination: 1977 (Diaconate and Priesthood)
- Consecration: July 2002 (Episcopate) by Tomas Millamena

Personal details
- Born: Ephraim Servañez Fajutagana; June 30, 1951 (age 75) Odiongan, Romblon, Philippines
- Denomination: Aglipayan (Philippine Independent Church/Iglesia Filipina Independiente)
- Residence: Metro Manila; Cavite
- Spouse: Teresita Fajutagana (m. 1980)
- Children: 5
- Education: Saint Andrew's Theological Seminary (BTh); Trinity University of Asia
- Motto: Walk humbly with your God
- Styles
- Reference style: His Eminence
- Spoken style: Your Eminence
- Religious style: Obispo Máximo XII; The Most Reverend

Ephraim Servañez Fajutagana is the twelfth Obispo Máximo or Supreme Bishop of the Philippine Independent Church (Iglesia Filipina Independiente or IFI) who served from 2011 to 2017. As the 12th Obispo Máximo, he attained the highest post of the church that goes back from its first and co-founder Gregorio Aglipay.

He was succeeded by Rhee Timbang as the Supreme Bishop in June 2017 after his six years tenure. He then became the Diocesan Bishop of Iloilo from 2017 until his retirement in 2021.

Delegates to the 12th Triennial General Assembly of the Iglesia Filipina Independiente unanimously voted into office as Obispo Máximo the church's then-General Secretary, Ephraim S. Fajutagana, on 10 May 2011. Fajutagana, from the Diocese of Romblon and Mindoros, bested two aspirants from Mindanao: Bishop Rhee Timbang (Diocese of Surigao) and Bishop Felixberto Calang (then-Diocese of Misamis Oriental, Bukidnon, and Camiguin).

Fajutagana has been in ministry since 1977, having served the Iglesia Filipina Independiente for a total of some thirty four (34) years before his election to the highest office of the church. He was ordained to the priesthood the same year after graduating from Saint Andrew's Theological Seminary in 1977 where he obtained his Bachelor of Theology degree. Fajutagana served at the Diocese of Romblon and Mindoros and was consecrated to the episcopate in July 2002 wherein he served at the Diocese of Cavite as diocesan bishop until his election as General Secretary in May 2005, and then eventually as Supreme Bishop in May 2011. He was also conferred with an honorary degree of Doctor of Divinity (honoris causa).

During his term as Supreme Bishop, he was also concurrently the chairperson of the National Council of Churches in the Philippines. In 2015, Fajutagana met and had an inter-religious dialogue with Pope Francis at the University of Santo Tomas during the latter's state visit to the Philippines.

== Personal life ==
Fajutagana was born on Odiongan, Romblon to Ángel Fajutagana y Forca (b. 3 October 1919) and Felicidad Servañez y Formon (b. 13 December 1919). He is a first cousin once removed of former Odiongan Sangguniang Bayan member Rolando Forca, who is a first cousin of his father.

Fajutagana is a member of the Freemasonry's Grand Lodge of the Philippines and was also the former chairperson of Workers Assistance Center, Inc. (WAC), a non-government organization.

Aglipayan Church titles
Preceded by Godofredo J. David	Supreme Bishop of the Philippine Independent Church; 11 June 2011 – 25 June 2017	Succeeded by Rhee Timbang
