= Rhee Timbang =

Filipino bishop (born 1959)

The Most Reverend Rhee Timbang, Obispo Maximo XIII
- Thirteenth Supreme Bishop of the Philippine Independent Church
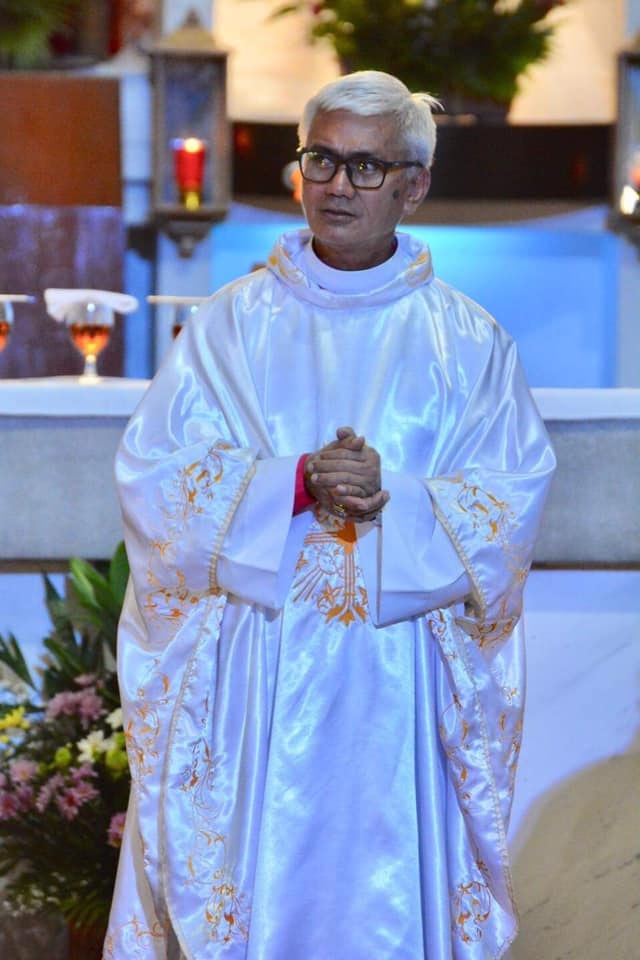
- Rhee Timbang, Obispo Maximo XIII, c. 2019.
- Church: Philippine Independent Church
- See: Manila
- Appointed: 10 May 2017
- Installed: 25 June 2017
- Term ended: 29 June 2023
- Predecessor: Ephraim Fajutagana
- Successor: Joel Porlares
- Other posts: IFI Diocesan Bishop of Surigao (1996–present; concurrent capacity during OM term)
- Previous post: Chairperson of the IFI Supreme Council of Bishops

Orders
- Ordination: 18 April 1982 (Diaconate); 23 May 1982 (Priesthood)
- Consecration: 29 September 1996 (Episcopate) by Alberto Ramento

Personal details
- Born: Rhee Millena Timbang; June 8, 1959 (age 67) Surigao del Norte, Philippines
- Denomination: Aglipayan (Philippine Independent Church/Iglesia Filipina Independiente)
- Residence: Surigao City; Metro Manila
- Spouse: Ma. Theresa "Mayette" Timbang
- Children: 2
- Education: Saint Andrew’s Theological Seminary (BTh and MDiv); Trinity University of Asia; University of the Philippines Diliman; Birmingham City University
- Styles
- Reference style: His Eminence
- Spoken style: Your Eminence
- Religious style: Obispo Máximo XIII; The Most Reverend

Rhee Millena Timbang is the thirteenth Obispo Máximo or Supreme Bishop of the Philippine Independent Church (Iglesia Filipina Independiente) who served from 2017 to 2023. He was elevated from Diocesan Bishop of Surigao to Obispo Máximo (OM) on June 25, 2017 and succeeded Ephraim Fajutagana after getting elected on May 9, 2017. He is the first supreme bishop from Mindanao. He was also previously the church's Chairperson of the Supreme Council of Bishops.

In his role as Obispo Máximo, as well as a widely regarded human rights defender and staunch advocate of the marginalized sectors, Timbang has been highly critical of then-Philippine president Rodrigo Duterte's declaration of martial law in Mindanao and the task force NTF-ELCAC. He has condemned those who would unjustly vilify and link him and his church with the ongoing communist rebellion in the Philippines.

A proactive promoter of ecumenism, in 2021, during the Philippine Independent Church's 119th Proclamation Anniversary and as part of celebrating 500 years of Christianity in the Philippines, Timbang led the signatories from the representatives of the Philippine Independent Church (IFI) in the signing of two joint statements with the Roman Catholic Church (RCC), represented by the officials of the Catholic Bishops' Conference of the Philippines, expressing both churches' readiness for a more ecumenical cooperation amidst diversity. The liturgical launching of the two documents was held at the IFI National Cathedral. The first statement was titled Celebrating the Gift of Faith, Learning from the Past, and Journeying Together and the second one as Mutual Recognition of Baptisms between the IFI and the RCC in the Philippines. In one of the statements, both IFI and Roman Catholic leaders "ask and pray for mutual forgiveness for any injuries inflicted in the past" and "strive for the healing and purification of memories among its members".

Timbang was succeeded by Joel Porlares, his former General Secretary, as the Supreme Bishop in June 2023 after six years of tenure. Timbang remains the diocesan bishop of the Diocese of Surigao.

Aglipayan Church titles
Preceded by Ephraim Fajutagana	Supreme Bishop of the Philippine Independent Church; 25 June 2017 – 29 June 2023	Succeeded by Joel Porlares
