= Alberto Ramento =

Filipino bishop, martyr and saint (1936–2006)

The Most Reverend, Venerable Martyr Alberto Ramento, Obispo Maximo IX D.D.
- Ninth Supreme Bishop of the Philippine Independent Church
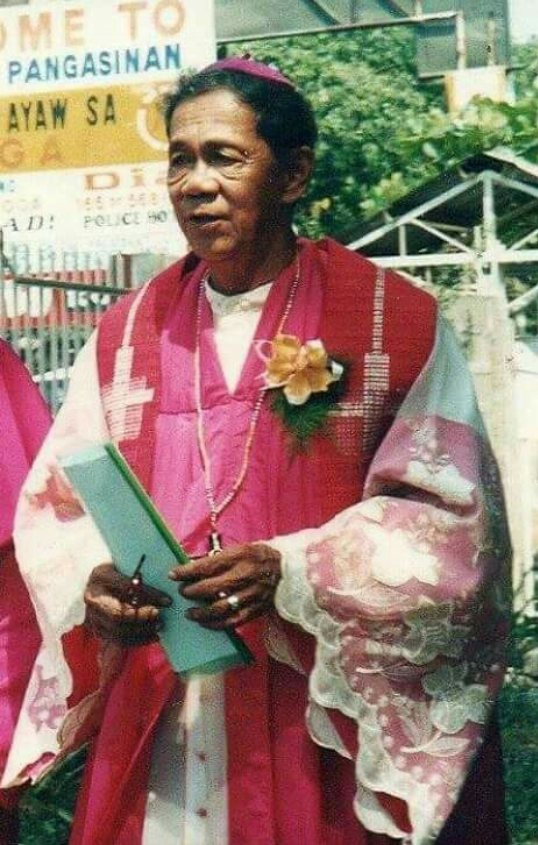
- Bishop Alberto Ramento, c. 1993
- Church: Philippine Independent Church
- See: Manila
- Installed: 10 May 1993
- Term ended: 10 May 1999
- Predecessor: Tito Pasco
- Successor: Tomás Millamena
- Other posts: Chairperson of the IFI Supreme Council of Bishops (2005–2006); IFI Bishop-in-Charge of Western Pangasinan (2000–2002); IFI Diocesan Bishop of Tarlac (1999–2006)
- Previous posts: IFI Diocesan Bishop of Cavite (1970–1993)

Orders
- Ordination: 8 April 1958 (Diaconate); 28 April 1958 (Priesthood) by Isabelo L. de los Reyes Jr.
- Consecration: 9 May 1969 (Episcopate) by Isabelo L. de los Reyes Jr., Thaddeus Zielinski, Philip Strong, and Gilbert Baker

Personal details
- Born: Alberto Baldovino Ramento; August 9, 1936 Guimba, Nueva Ecija, Commonwealth of the Philippines
- Died: October 3, 2006 (aged 70) (Assassinated) Tarlac City, Philippines
- Buried: Church of Saint Anthony of Padua, Cavite City, Philippines
- Denomination: Aglipayan (Philippine Independent Church/Iglesia Filipina Independiente)
- Residence: Tarlac City
- Parents: Felipe Ramento y Curpoz (father); Margarita Baldovino y Bermudez (mother)
- Spouse: Celerina Mendoza (m. 1963)
- Children: 4
- Education: Far Eastern University (AB); Saint Andrew's Theological Seminary (BTh and MDiv); General Theological Seminary (D.D. – h.c.)

Sainthood
- Feast day: October 3
- Venerated in: Catholic Diocese of the Old Catholics in Germany; Philippine Independent Church (non-canonized)
- Title as Saint: Bishop and Martyr
- Canonized: October 3, 2010; Mainz, Germany by the Catholic Diocese of the Old Catholics in Germany
- Attributes: Episcopal vestments Crown of martyrdom Martyr's palm
- Patronage: Human rights Persecuted Christians
- Shrines: National Cathedral of the Holy Child, Taft Avenue, Ermita, Manila; Church of Saint Sebastian, Tarlac City; Church of Saint Anthony of Padua, Cavite City

Ordination history
History
Diaconal ordination
- Ordained by: Isabelo L. de los Reyes Jr.
- Date: 8 April 1958
- Place: Church of Maria Clara, Santa Cruz, Manila
Priestly ordination
- Ordained by: Isabelo L. de los Reyes Jr.
- Date: 28 April 1958
- Place: Church of Maria Clara, Santa Cruz, Manila
Episcopal consecration
- Principal consecrator: Isabelo L. de los Reyes Jr.
- Co-consecrators: Thaddeus Zielinski, Philip Strong, and Gilbert Baker
- Date: 9 May 1969
- Place: National Cathedral of the Holy Child, Taft Avenue, Ermita, Manila
Episcopal succession
Bishops consecrated by Alberto Ramento as principal consecrator
- Rhee Timbang Obispo Maximo XIII: 29 September 1996
- Styles
- Reference style: His Eminence
- Spoken style: Your Eminence
- Religious style: Obispo Máximo IX; The Most Reverend
- Posthumous style: Venerable Martyr

Alberto Baldovino Ramento (August 9, 1936 – October 3, 2006) was the ninth supreme bishop (Obispo Máximo) and a former chairperson of the Supreme Council of Bishops of the Philippine Independent Church or Iglesia Filipina Independiente (IFI). He was known by the moniker, "The Bishop of the Poor Peasants and Workers". A known vocal critic against human rights abuses in the Philippines, he was murdered by unknown assailants in 2006, with his case currently remains unsolved.

== Life ==
Ramento was born in an affluent family to Felipe Ramento y Curpoz and Margarita Baldovino y Bermudez. His grandfather Don Felix Ramento was Guimba's town mayor from 1922 to 1925 and Alberto had three uncles who were pioneer priests in the Iglesia Filipina Independiente. His father Felipe was also the chief of police in Guimba. The Ramento family owned several large plots of land inherited from the Baldovino clan, Alberto's mother's side. Ramento was a Freemason. He was married to Celerina Mendoza of Hermosa, Bataan and had children namely: Alberto II (Aldos), Aleli, Alberto III (Altres), and Liezel.

Prior to his election as Supreme Bishop, Ramento was the Diocesan Bishop of Cavite from 1970 to 1993. He was co-chair of the Ecumenical Bishops' Forum, chaired the Promotion of Church Peopleʼs Response–Central Luzon and human rights group Karapatan–Tarlac, and chaired other various church and cause-oriented organizations. He was an ardent supporter of the Hacienda Luisita strikers. As the chairman of the Workers Assistance Center, Inc. (WAC), he also supported the struggle of the workers in Cavite, Philippines. He was also a vocal and influential critic of the Gloria Arroyo administration. He was also very vocal about the murder of IFI priest and fellow human rights advocate William Tadena, believed to be murdered by the Cojuangco family, for his support of the Hacienda Luisita farmers.

In September 1998, the National Democratic Front of the Philippines (NDFP) Negotiating Panel nominated him as an Independent Observer in the Joint Monitoring Committee (JMC) of the Comprehensive Agreement on Respect for Human Rights and International Humanitarian Law (CARHRIHL).

He served as the Diocesan Bishop of Tarlac after his term as Supreme Bishop ended.

== Death ==
Ramento was stabbed to death by unknown assailants. He was found dead with multiple stab wounds inside his rectory at the Church of Saint Sebastian in Tarlac City in the early morning of October 3, 2006. His remains were cremated 10 days after his death and viewing. His ashes were interred at the Church of Saint Anthony of Padua in Cavite City.

Prior to his death, Ramento had been actively involved in various organizations and movements advocating human rights, social justice (especially for the working class), civil liberties, and genuine peace, to which he had received death threats from. Initial police findings ruled his death as robbery with homicide, but IFI church officials, his family, followers and supporters were not convinced. A local court later dismissed the case against the then-robbery suspects because police failed to attend court hearings. His case remains unsolved.

The Church of Saint Sebastian was once temporarily closed for a number of years after Ramento's death but has since re-opened.

IFI created the "Ramento Project for Rights Defenders" (RPRD), the IFI's human rights advocacy and service arm, in his honor.

== Veneration ==
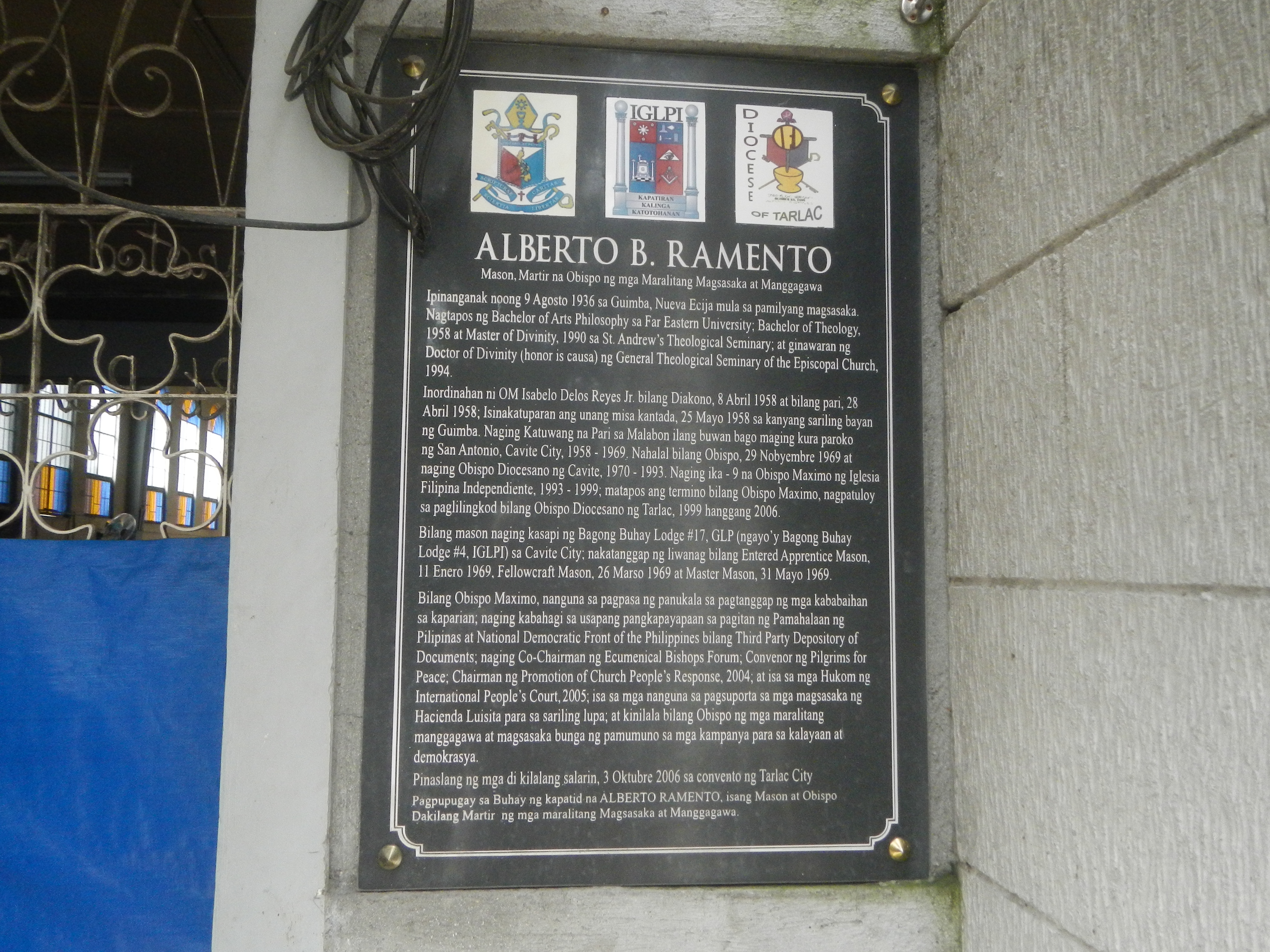
Alberto Ramento commemorative plaque at the Church of Saint Sebastian in Tarlac City where he was assassinated.

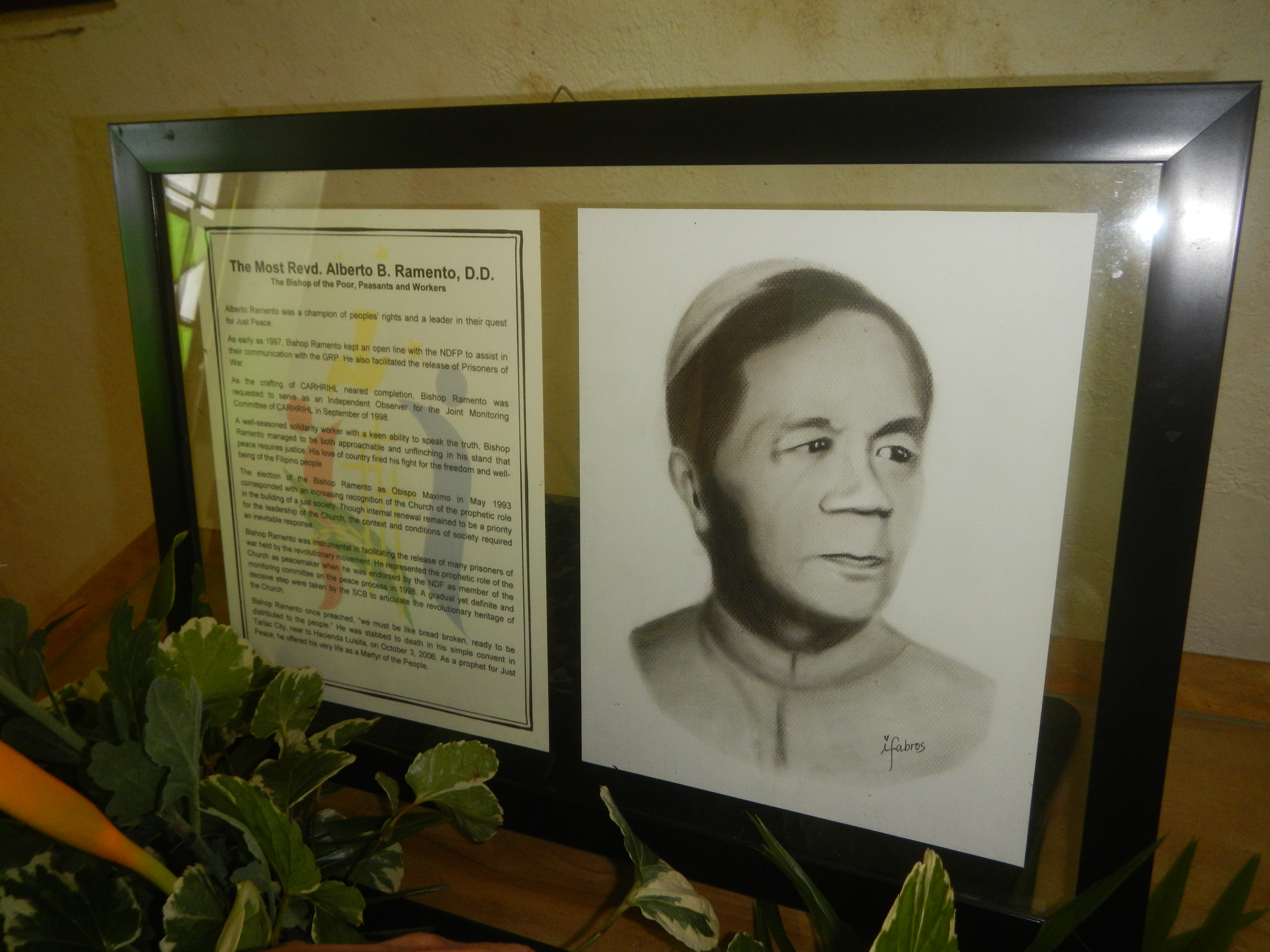
Commemorative portrait of Alberto Ramento displayed at the Aglipay Central Theological Seminary (ACTS) in Urdaneta, Pangasinan.

On October 3, 2010, the Catholic Diocese of the Old Catholics in Germany of the Union of Utrecht canonized Ramento and commemorated him as a martyr in a liturgical service in Mainz, as approved by the International Old Catholic Bishops' Conference. His commemoration/feast day is included in the liturgical calendar of the Union of Utrecht of the Old Catholic Churches.

Ramento is venerated as a venerable and martyr both in the Union of Utrecht and the Philippine Independent Church. His commemoration/feast day is celebrated on October 3 every year.

Aglipayan Church titles
Preceded by Tito Pasco	Supreme Bishop of the Philippine Independent Church; 10 May 1993 – 10 May 1999	Succeeded by Tomas Millamena
