= Gregorio Aglipay =

Filipino bishop and revolutionary figure (1860–1940)

The Most Reverend Monsignor and The Honourable Gregorio Aglipay, Obispo Máximo I D.D.
- First Supreme Bishop of the Philippine Independent Church
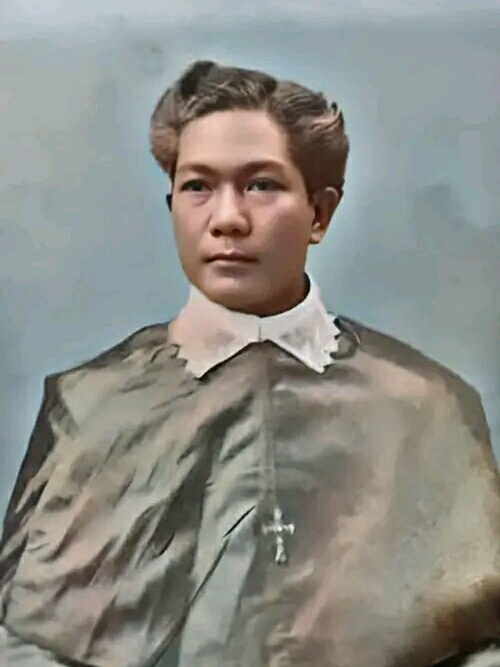
- Church: Philippine Independent Church
- See: Tondo
- Installed: September 6, 1902
- Term ended: September 1, 1940
- Predecessor: Position created
- Successor: Santiago Antonio Fonacier y Suguitan

Orders
- Ordination: 1887 (as a Roman Catholic subdeacon); 1888 (as a Roman Catholic deacon); December 21, 1889 (as a Roman Catholic priest)
- Consecration: January 18, 1903 (as the first Supreme Bishop of the Philippine Independent Church)
- Rank: Priest (Roman Catholic Church); Supreme Bishop (Philippine Independent Church)

Personal details
- Born: Gregorio Aglipay Cruz y Labayán; May 5, 1860 Batac, Ilocos Norte, Captaincy General of the Philippines, Spanish Empire
- Died: September 1, 1940 (aged 80) Manila, Philippine Commonwealth
- Buried: Gregorio Aglipay National Shrine, Batac, Ilocos Norte, Philippines
- Denomination: Roman Catholic (excommunicated in 1899); Independent Catholic / Protestant (early IFI/PIC)
- Spouse: Pilar Jamias y Ver (m. 1939)
- Children: 1
- Occupation: Religious leader, guerrilla leader, social and political activist, politician
- Profession: Priest, Monsignor, Bishop of Aglipayan Church
- Education: Colegio de San Juan de Letran (AB – transferred); University of Santo Tomas (AB – graduated; LL.B and theology – discontinued); Immaculate Conception School of Theology (Vigan Seminary)
- Motto: "Serve the people!"

Sainthood
- Feast day: September 5
- Venerated in: The Episcopal Church (Saint on trial use only); Philippine Independent Church (Non-canonized)
- Title as Saint: Bishop, Witness, Servant of God, Visionary, Patriot, and Crusader
- Attributes: Episcopal vestments
- Patronage: Iglesia Filipina Independiente
- Shrines: Gregorio Aglipay National Shrine Batac, Ilocos Norte; Gregorio L. Aglipay Shrine in Kullabeng Pinili, Ilocos Norte

Military Vicar General of the Revolutionary Government of the Philippines
- In office October 20, 1898 – January 23, 1899

Member of the Malolos Congress from Ilocos Norte
- In office September 15, 1898 – November 13, 1899 Serving with Pedro Paterno, Primitivo Donato, Martín García, José Luna, and Pio Romero

Personal details
- Party: Republican (1905–1935)
- Other political affiliations: Independent (until 1905)
- Known for: The first head (Supreme Bishop) of the Philippine Independent Church (Iglesia Filipina Independiente)

Military service
- Allegiance: First Philippine Republic
- Branch/service: Philippine Republican Army
- Years of service: 1899–1901
- Rank: Lieutenant General
- Battles/wars: Philippine–American War
- Styles
- Reference style: His Eminence
- Spoken style: Your Eminence
- Religious style: Obispo Máximo I Monsignor; Bishop
- Posthumous style: The Most Reverend

Gregorio Aglipay Cruz y Labayán (Latin: Gregorius Aglipay Cruz; Filipino: Gregorio Labayan Aglipay Cruz; pronounced uhg-LEE-pahy; May 5, 1860 – September 1, 1940) was a Filipino former Roman Catholic priest and revolutionary during the Philippine Revolution and Philippine–American War who became the first head and leader of the Iglesia Filipina Independiente (IFI), the first-ever wholly Filipino-led independent Christian Church in the Philippines in the form of a nationalist church.

Known for inciting patriotic rebellion among the Filipino clergy during the Philippine Revolution and Philippine–American War, he was also a political activist who became acquainted with writer and labor leader Isabelo de los Reyes who would then start an independent Christian Filipino Church colloquially named after Aglipay in 1902 as a revolt against the Roman Catholic Church, which was the state religion of the Philippines at the time, due to the mistreatment of the Spanish friars towards the Filipinos. Contrary to popular belief, Aglipay did not join the IFI until one month from its proclamation by de los Reyes and the Unión Obrera Democrática.

Aglipay was previously excommunicated by Archbishop Bernardino Nozaleda y Villa of Manila in May 1899, upon the expressed permission of Pope Leo XIII, due to his involvement in revolutionary activities, despite his prior intercession and defense of some of the Spanish Roman Catholic clergy from liberal-nationalist Filipino revolutionaries. The Roman Catholic Church made attempts to bring Aglipay back to their fold, but failed. Aglipay joined Freemasonry in May 1918, a society excommunicated by the Roman Catholic Church. Aglipay married Pilar Jamias y Ver from Sarrat, Ilocos Norte in 1939 and then died one year later. Followers of Aglipay through the Church are sometimes colloquially referred to by their membership as Aglipayans.

== Early life, studies and priesthood ==
Historical marker at Batac, Ilocos Norte, the birthplace of Aglipay

Born in Batac, Ilocos Norte on May 5 and baptized on May 9, 1860, in the Roman Catholic Church, Aglipay personally preferred May 8 as the celebration for his date of birth. He was the third child of Pedro Aglipay y Cruz and Victoriana Labayán y Hilario and became an orphan at a young age who grew up in the care of relatives at the tobacco fields in the last volatile decades of the Spanish occupation in the Philippines. He bore deep grievances against the colonial Spanish government of the islands, stemming from abuses within the agricultural system. Arrested at age fourteen for failing to meet his quota as a tobacco-picking worker for a Spanish tobacco grower, he later moved to the country's capital of Manila in 1876 to study law under the tutelage of lawyer and private school owner Julian Carpio, with the financial help of his uncle Francisco del Amor Romas who was a menial employee of the Dominican Sisters School of Santa Catalina.

After two years of study under Carpio, Aglipay continued his studies at the Colegio de San Juan de Letran in 1878 for his third year as a working student, and later at the University of Santo Tomas in 1880 for his fourth year wherein he was an academic topnotcher. During his time in Santo Tomas, Aglipay met José Rizal, a senior medical student who used to be his fencing partner, and a newly transferred Isabelo de los Reyes who also came from Letran. Aglipay obtained his pre-law Bachelor of Arts degree at Santo Tomas in 1881 and subsequently enrolled in law and theology in 1882, still at Santo Tomas. He then discontinued his law and theology studies at Santo Tomas and entered the Roman Catholic seminary in Vigan, Ilocos Sur in 1883 at age 23, as previously influenced by Rizal. He was ordained to the priesthood six years later on December 21, 1889, on the Feast of St. Thomas the Apostle, at the old Dominican Church in Intramuros, Manila and celebrated his first mass as an ordained Roman Catholic priest on January 1, 1890, at Santa Cruz Church, Manila.

Aglipay then began a career as an assistant priest to Spanish friars in various parishes around the main northern island of Luzon, notably in the Roman Catholic Archdiocese of Nueva Segovia. He later dropped Cruz in his surname and while serving in Victoria, Tarlac, Aglipay discreetly gave aid to the revolutionaries and employed thirty carpenters who in reality were revolutionists in touch with the Katipunan group. Aglipay then organized the said revolutionists and called their group Liwanag ("Light"), a local auxiliary of the Katipunan based in Victoria, Tarlac.

== Philippine Revolution ==
In 1896, a secret society, Katipunan, led by the Supremo, Andrés Bonifacio, was discovered by Spanish authorities. With Roman Catholicism as the state religion, Manila Archbishop Bernardino Nozaleda tasked Aglipay to confront the revolutionary leaders, offering them a level of autonomy in the future for the Philippines if they would end the rebellion. General Emilio Aguinaldo, in turn, sent Colonel Luciano San Miguel to Aglipay with the intention of getting him to join the rebellion. Aguinaldo convinced Aglipay, who appointed him as military chaplain (capellán castrense) of the revolutionary government sometime in May or June 1898, the first ever to be appointed as such in the Philippine Revolution.

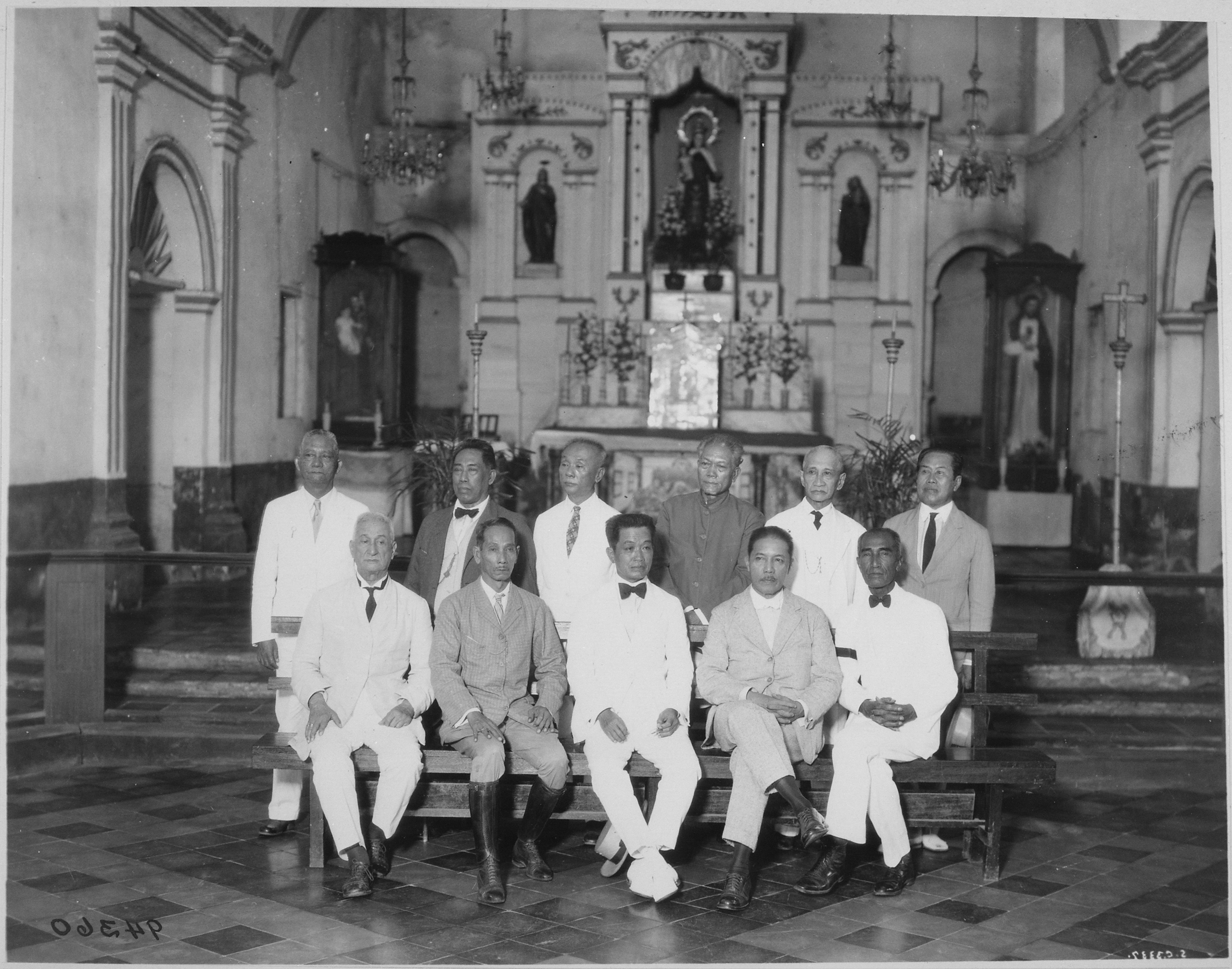
Aglipay (third from right, back row) together with some of the other delegates to the first Assembly of Representatives of the Malolos Congress, taken in 1929 at the Barasoain Church, 30 years after the Malolos Constitution was ratified.

Aglipay also later became a member of the Malolos Congress, the lone member coming from the religious sector, although he also represented his home province of Ilocos Norte, as well. On October 20, 1898, Aguinaldo elevated Aglipay to the post of Military Vicar General (Vicario General Castrense) of the revolutionaries, a position that made him head of all military chaplains in the revolution. In the course of Aglipay's journey to the north, the Philippine–American War started at the conclusion of the Spanish–American War. Aglipay interpreted his appointment as Vicar General as making him Ecclesiastical Superior to all native Filipino priests, who as such should all be appointed military chaplains for the duration of the war.

== Philippine–American War ==
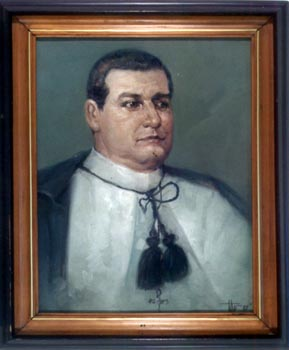
Then-Manila Archbishop Bernardino Nozaleda y Villa, who served from 1889 to 1902, excommunicated Aglipay upon the expressed permission of the pope due to his involvement in revolutionary activities at the height of the Philippine–American War.

When Aglipay returned to Manila and discovered that the Americans had attacked, he joined the revolution. The fighting that broke out between the U.S. and Filipino forces on February 4, 1899, prompted Aglipay to withdraw to Ilocos Norte to organize an armed resistance and was given the rank of lieutenant-general. He eventually formed the guerrilla group "Sandataan". Aglipay was summoned to Manila by Manila Archbishop Bernardino Nozaleda but did not appear, which resulted in Nozaleda excommunicating Aglipay on April 29, 1899, for "usurpation of ecclesiastical jurisdiction" upon the expressed permission of Pope Leo XIII, and the sentence of excommunication was exposed from May 4 to June 5 in the archiepiscopal tribunal of Manila.

Aglipay was one of the last generals to surrender to the Americans. Realizing the futility of the cause for which they had been fighting, on April 28, 1901, a month after the capture of Aguinaldo, he surrendered to Captain Edward Mann Lewis of the 20th U.S. Regular Infantry in Laoag, to prevent further casualties from his men as he saw less chances of winning from the much dominant American troops. After his surrender, he later moved back to the already-American-occupied Manila and worked at a reconciliation with the Roman Catholic Church. The Americans officially ended the war on July 2, 1902, and granted full amnesty to all persons in the Philippines who had participated in the conflict.

== After the war ==
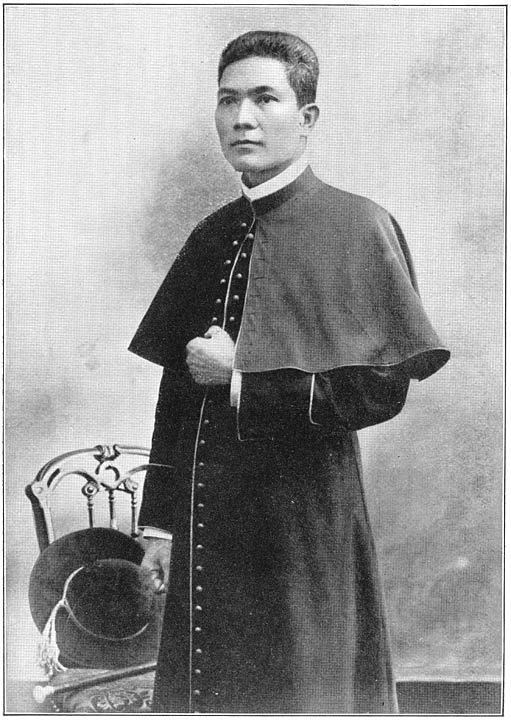
Aglipay circa 1905

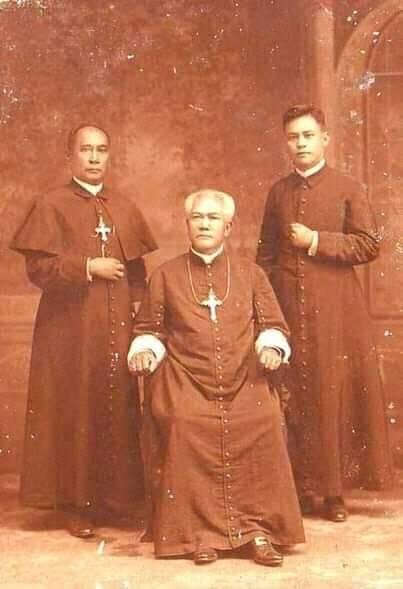
Undated photo of Aglipay (center, seated), together with two unnamed IFI priests

Following the end of the war in 1902, writer-activist Isabelo de los Reyes was working towards the formation of a nationalist church that is independent of Rome. Spanish friars were still in control of the parishes all throughout the country at the time of the American occupation. On August 3, de los Reyes and his labor group Unión Obrera Democrática proclaimed the establishment of the church and suggested in absentia that Aglipay be its first head bishop. Aglipay, a devout Catholic at the time even after he had been excommunicated, was reluctant as he was initially against a schism, but eventually accepted de los Reyes' offer to head an independent church on September 6, 1902, and was appointed as the first Supreme Bishop or Obispo Máximo of the "Philippine Independent Church" (officially Iglesia Filipina Independiente, abbreviated as IFI and also referred as the "Aglipayan Church" after him). The church retained many of the Roman Catholic forms of worship.

According to renowned historian Teodoro Agoncillo, Aglipay finally decided to join the new church after his talks with Francisco Foradada, a Spaniard Jesuit priest and author, backfired. Knowing that Aglipay was influential with the Filipino clergy, the Jesuits assigned Foradada in a desperate attempt to persuade Aglipay from returning to the Roman Catholic fold in order to further prevent the schism from succeeding. In a meeting held at the Jesuit House in Santa Ana, Manila, Aglipay was allegedly offered to be appointed bishop or archbishop with a large sum of money thrown in if he would return. Aglipay would have sign a document of confession to the Roman Catholic Church but on condition of assurance that by signing the document, the issues of the native Filipino Catholic priests would be solved, and that the Filipino clergy would be appointed to the posts formerly held by the Spanish regulars. Foradada responded by tactlessly asking Aglipay "why would he care about Filipino priests since the world knows that they are vicious and hopelessly inefficient." It was believed that Aglipay felt insulted by Foradada's brash comments that he angrily lunged at him and held him by the nape demanding to withdraw his remarks as Foradada, terrified, fell on his knees. Witnesses of the reported incident include León María Guerrero and Joaquin Luna. Subsequently, Aglipay reputedly walked out from the meeting and threw away the document.

Although he had already decided to join the new church after his first failed conference with the Jesuits, Aglipay was still disinclined to accept the supreme bishop post. He even met with American Protestant leaders and tried to persuade them to assist and join them in their new Filipinized church in order "to divide the ranks of the [Roman] Catholics." Aglipay also suggested that Filipino priests would be appointed to higher ranks on the clergy of the new church. The American Protestants declined Aglipay's proposal as they found the new church "too Roman in its ritual" and "too rationalistic in its theology." They were also seemingly adamant on having Filipino church leaders at the time as they were likely "enjoying the feeling of superiority."

In a final attempt, the Jesuits tried to negotiate again with Aglipay years after he joined the new church and accepted the supreme bishop post through a more diplomatic Spanish Father Joaquin Villalonga. Pope Pius X had approved to grant Aglipay pardon if the new church went back to the Roman Catholic fold, but Aglipay was already persistent to continue the Iglesia Filipina Independiente.

Aglipay celebrated his first mass as the de facto Supreme Bishop on October 26, 1902. On January 18, 1903, Aglipay was consecrated to the position of Supreme Bishop in Manila by the IFI Church's 12 then-bishops (representing the 12 apostles), who were the Bishops of Isabela, Cagayan, Pangasinan, Abra, Nueva Ecija, Cavite, and Manila. As Supreme Bishop, he allied himself with the nationalist and most radical political parties during his time, like the Sakdalistas, and later on, even with the Socialist and Communist parties.

During the theological discussions he attended while visiting other churches on his travels abroad, Aglipay later rejected the belief in the Trinity and became theologically accepting of the main Unitarian belief, however, a significant number from his own Church refused to accept his amended theology. Aglipay's unitarian, rationalist, and progressive theological ideas were evident in his "novena", the "Pagsisiyam sa Birhen sa Balintawak", 1925 and its English translation, "Novenary of the Motherland", 1926. Aglipay eventually became honorary vice president of the American Unitarian Association.

Aglipay was awarded Doctor of Divinity (honoris causa) by the Meadville Theological School in Chicago, Illinois in 1931.

== Later life and legacy ==
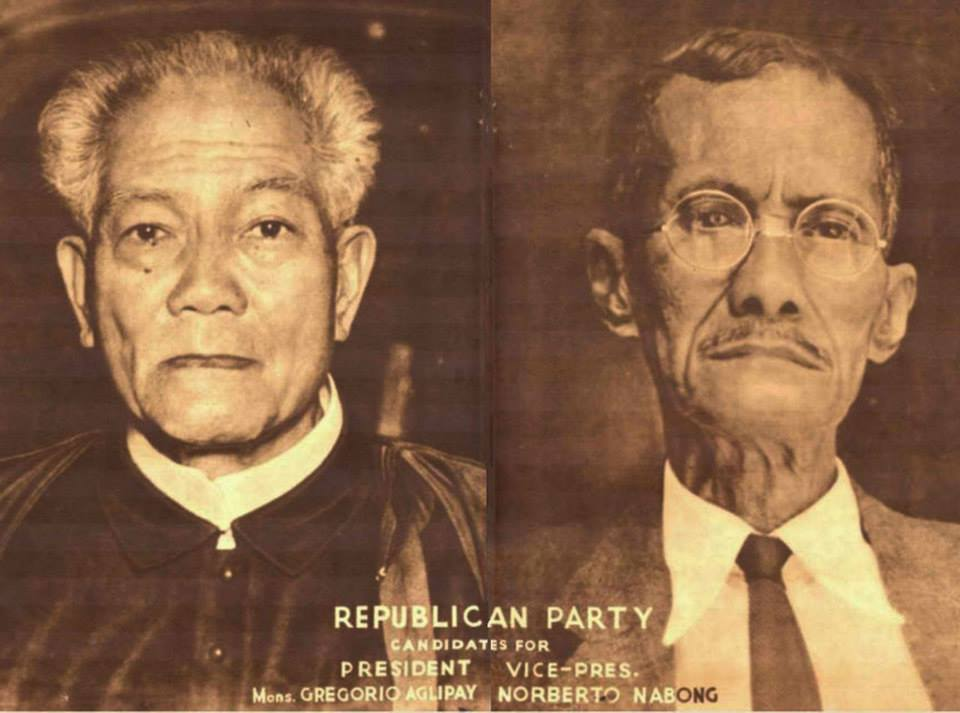
Aglipay as the presidential candidate of the Republican Party in the 1935 Philippine presidential election, with his running mate Norberto Nabong.

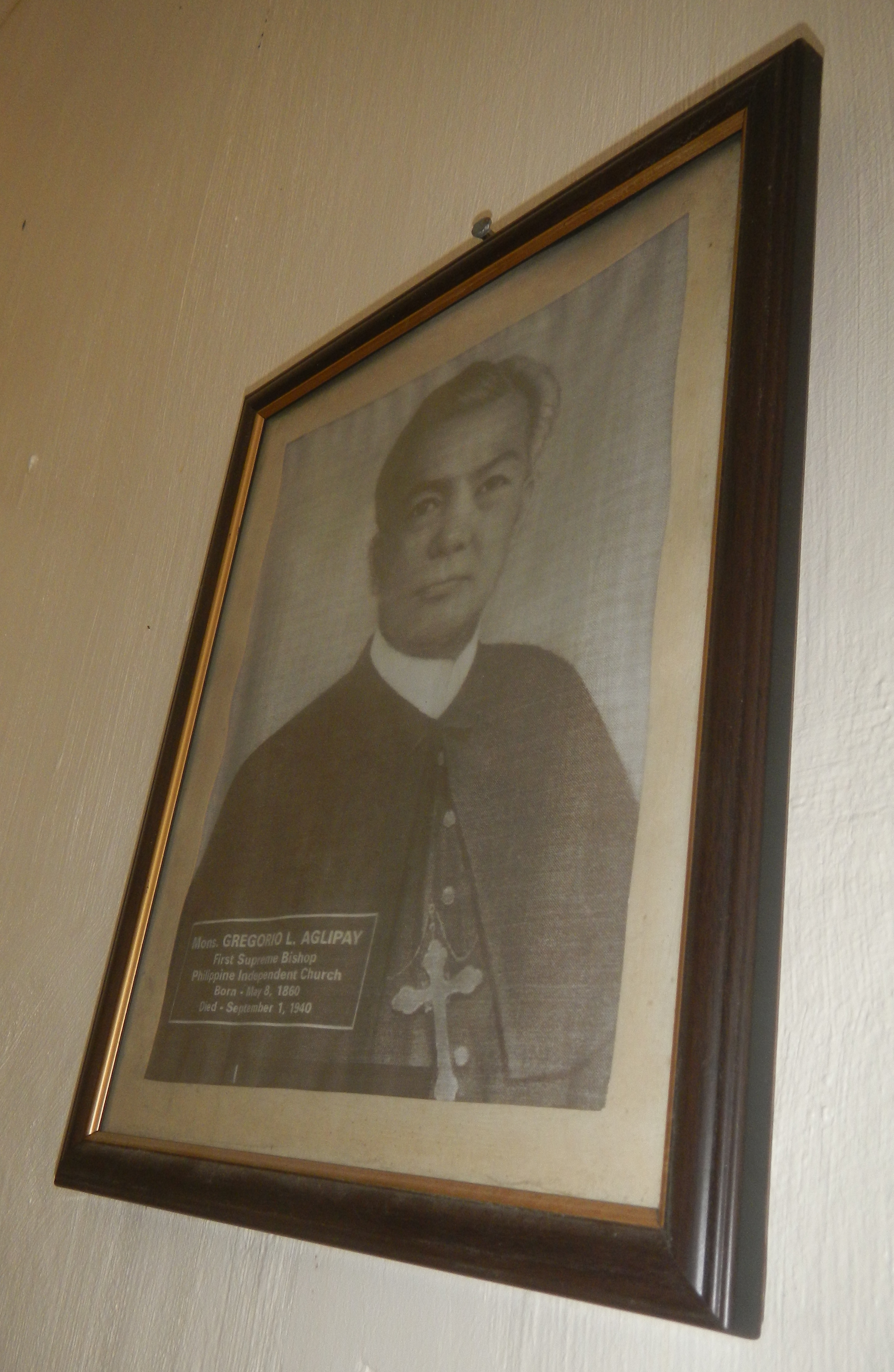
Portrait of Aglipay at the Iglesia Filipina Independiente Parish of St. John the Baptist in Taguig City

Despite being a Christian leader, Aglipay, like other Filipino revolutionaries, later joined Freemasonry. Spanish Masonic Grand Master Miguel Morayta personally pushed Aglipay to Freemasonry. In May 1918, Aglipay obliged and was inducted at Magdalo Lodge 31 in Cavite. In 1925, Aglipay rose to the 32nd degree, one degree short of the highest Masonic rank.

Aglipay ran for elections in 1935 as President of the Commonwealth under the Republican Party, the first nationwide at-large election ever held in the Philippines (per the Tydings–McDuffie Act). He was the last presidential candidate to announce his candidacy, along with Partido Komunista ng Pilipinas' candidate Norberto Nabong as his running mate in a joint Republican-Communist Party ticket, but both lost to Manuel L. Quezon and Sergio Osmeña of the Nacionalista Party, respectively. Aglipay was the first ever religious leader to run for presidency in the history of the Philippines. He sent a congratulatory message to Quezon three days after the election when the results became apparent and quickly accepted defeat.

Since his Church permits married clergy, Aglipay married then 64-year-old Pilar Jamias y Ver, a teacher from Sarrat, Ilocos Norte, in 1939 at the IFI Tondo Cathedral officiated by bishop Fernando Buyser; but he died the following year on September 1, 1940, due to natural causes (cerebral hemorrhage), aged 80. Then-President Manuel L. Quezon, his cabinet, and most of the highest state officials came to pay their respects in a funeral service for Aglipay.

Although he had for many years opposed celibacy among the priesthood, Aglipay himself was not married until the age of 79. Aglipay and Jamias begot a daughter twenty six years before their marriage, named Liwliwa, born on February 24, 1913. She served as Philippine secretary of the Rationalist Society of London and secretary to Aglipay in translating English letters for his contacts abroad. She studied at the University of the Philippines. Liwliwa died on February 17, 1938, seven days before her 25th birthday or thirteen months before the marriage of Aglipay and Jamias. She was buried in the Pasay Municipal Cemetery.

Statue of Aglipay at the national shrine dedicated to him in Batac, Ilocos Norte

Also referred to as Apo Aglipay by his followers, Aglipay held the position of Supreme Bishop until his death. His remains are interred at the Cathedral of Saint Mary, Aglipay National Shrine in Batac, Ilocos Norte.

Aglipay was on trial calendars in The Episcopal Church's calendar of saints in the years 2009 and 2015 but the aforementioned calendars were never made official and his feast is not part of current proposals.

The City of Batac, Ilocos Norte annually celebrates the 1st day of September as a special non-working holiday to commemorate the death anniversary of Aglipay, known as the "Gregorio L. Aglipay Day", which was enacted on February 10, 1989, as per Republic Act No. 6701.

== Sources ==
- Halili, Christine N. (2004) Philippine History, pp 192–93. ISBN 9712339343.

Aglipayan Church titles
Preceded by Position created	Supreme Bishop of the Philippine Independent Church; 6 September 1902 – 1 September 1940	Succeeded by Santiago Fonacier
