= Gregorio Aglipay National Shrine =

National shrine in Batac, Ilocos Norte, Philippines

- Philippines Historical Committee marker
- Interactive map of Gregorio Aglipay National Shrine
- Type: Shrine
- Location: Batac, Ilocos Norte, Philippines
- Coordinates: 18°03′09″N 120°33′42″E
- Designated: 1949
- Designation: National Shrine (Level 1)

The Gregorio Aglipay National Shrine is a memorial shrine in Batac, Ilocos Norte, Philippines.

The shrine is dedicated to Gregorio Aglipay (1860–1940). He was a Catholic priest and served as a military chaplain and military vicar general during the Philippine Revolution in 1898. He was excommunicated in 1899 for rebelling against Spanish rule in the Philippines, a period when Roman Catholicism was the state religion in the country. He became a member of the Malolos Congress from 1898 to 1899, the lone member coming from the religious sector and also represented his home province of Ilocos Norte. He was also a lieutenant-general during the Philippine-American War. Aglipay later co-founded the Philippine Independent Church with Isabelo de los Reyes in 1902 and became the church's first supreme bishop.

The shrine houses Aglipay's mausoleum and the Cathedral of Saint Mary of the Philippine Independent Church. It has a marker dated 1949 from the Philippines Historical Committee, now the National Historical Commission of the Philippines. The commission declares the site as a national shrine.
