= Supreme Bishop =

Head of the Philippine Independent Church

Supreme Bishop of the Philippine Independent Church Obispo Máximo

Aglipayan
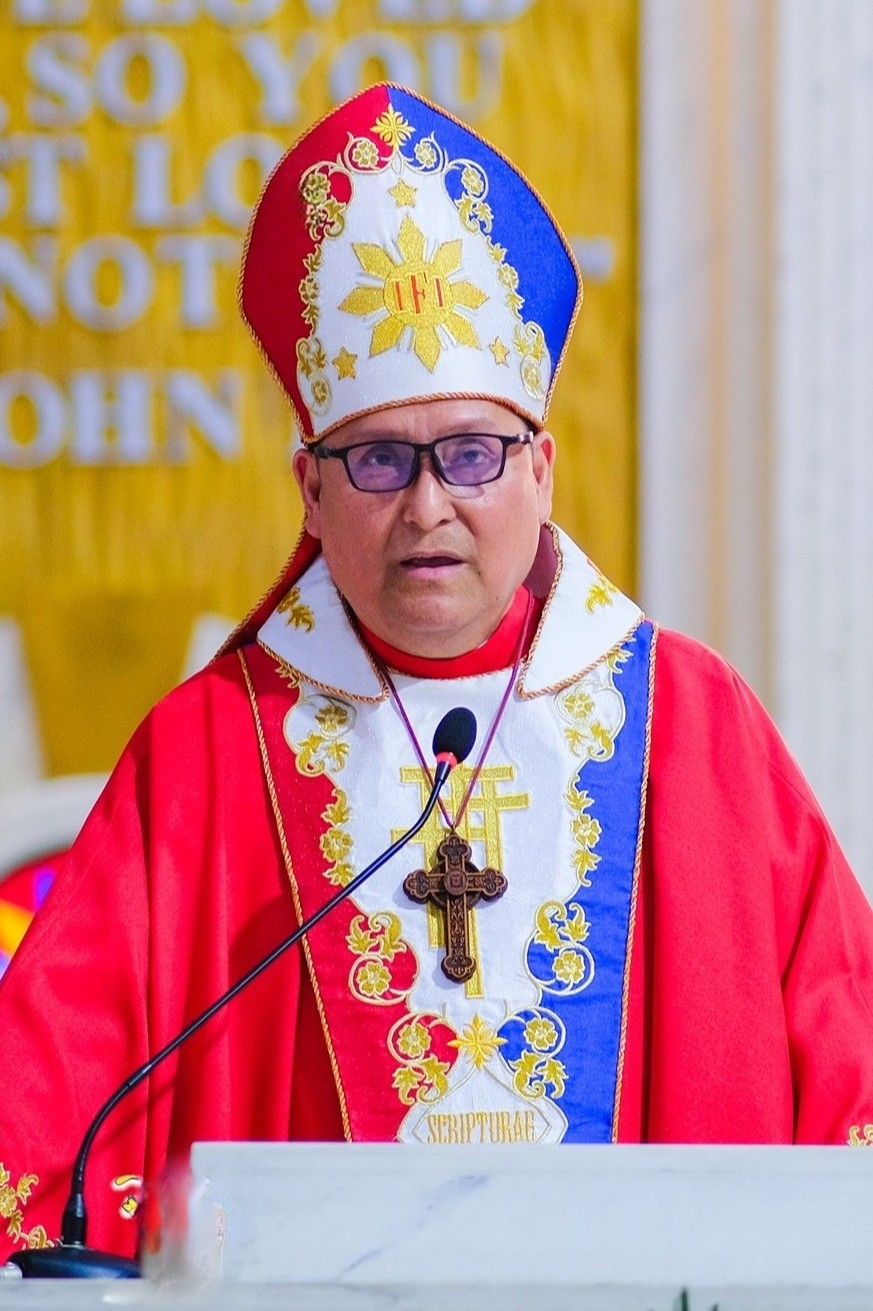
- Joel Porlares, Obispo Máximo XIV
- Incumbent; Joel Ocop Porlares since June 29, 2023

Location
- Country: Philippines
- Residence: IFI Centennial House; Metrocor-B Homes, Talon Singko, Las Piñas City 1747
- Headquarters: Obispado Máximo #1500 Taft Avenue, Ermita, Manila

Information
- First holder: Gregorio L. Aglípay
- Denomination: Philippine Independent Church
- Established: September 6, 1902; 124 years ago
- Diocese: General
- Cathedral: Iglesia Filipina Independiente National Cathedral of the Holy Child
- Governance: Autocephalous
- Bishops emeritus: Godofredo J. David; Ephraim S. Fajutagana; Rhee M. Timbang

Website
- www.ifico.ph
- Obispo Máximo ng Iglesia Filipina Independiente
- Style: His Eminence
- Abbreviation: O.M.
- Seat: Manila, Philippines
- Term length: 6 years Non-renewable for a consecutive term (since 1981)
- Succession: Election

The Supreme Bishop (Spanish: Obispo Máximo), abbreviated O.M., is the leader or primate of the autocephalous nationalist Independent Catholic denomination Iglesia Filipina Independiente (Philippine Independent Church) or IFI, known informally as the "Aglipayan Church". The Supreme Bishop is the spiritual head, chief pastor, and the chief executive officer of the church. He is also first among equals (primus inter pares) among the church's bishops.

The Supreme Bishop is elected by the General Assembly of the church and heads the Executive Commission, the highest policy-making body in the absence of the General Assembly.

Joel Porlares was elected Obispo Máximo on May 9, 2023, by a majority vote of delegates during their 15th General Assembly and was officially proclaimed the evening of the same day after previously serving as General Secretary, the second-highest post in the church. He is the fourteenth in a line of succession from Gregorio Aglipay, the first Obispo Máximo.

The Supreme Bishop's office is at the Obispado Máximo (English: Central Office) within the National Cathedral of the Holy Child compound, located along Taft Avenue, Manila.

== List of supreme bishops ==
No.	Supreme bishop	Period	Notes
1	Gregorio Aglípay y Labáyan (1860–1940)	6 September 1902 – 1 September 1940 (37 years, 361 days)	From Batac, Ilocos Norte.; Former Roman Catholic priest.; Revolutionary figure during the Philippine Revolution and Philippine–American War.; Co-founder of the IFI, longest-serving Obispo Máximo, and a candidate for the first nationwide at-large election ever held in the Philippines: the 1935 presidential elections (also first ever religious leader to ran for presidency in the history of the Philippines).; Died in office.; Remains interred at the Aglipay National Shrine in Ilocos Norte.
2	Santiago Antonio Fonacier y Suguítan (1885–1977)	14 October 1940 – 21 January 1946 (5 years, 99 days)	From Laoag, Ilocos Norte.; Initially took a bachelor of arts course at Escuela Docente de Laoag.; One of the pioneering seminarians in one of the earliest IFI seminaries established in October 1902 and was ordained priest in the IFI in November 1903.; Served as senator from 1919 to 1925.; Consecrated as bishop on January 12, 1933.; Seceded from the IFI and formed the Independent Church of Filipino Christians.
3	Gerardo Bayaca y Medina (1893–1975)	22 January 1946 – 1 September 1946 (222 days)	From Laoag, Ilocos Norte.; Earned his bachelor of philosophy and theology from the Vigan Seminary.; Ordained as Roman Catholic priest on June 6, 1919.; Left Roman Catholicism to join the IFI; got incardinated into the IFI in October 1933.; Initially consecrated as bishop in the IFI on January 22, 1939 prior to getting elected as Obispo Máximo and was assigned diocesan bishop in the IFI dioceses of Nueva Ecija, Tarlac, Zambales, Cagayan and Isabela.; Served as transitory and interim Obispo Máximo.; Reconsecrated and bestowed with apostolic succession by The Episcopal Church on April 7, 1948.; Remains interred at an IFI cemetery in Santo Domingo, Ilocos Sur.
4	Isabelo Valentin de los Reyes y Lopez (1900–1971)	1 September 1946 – 10 October 1971 (25 years, 39 days)	Born in Madrid, Spain and later raised in Manila.; Also known as Isabelo de los Reyes, Jr., he was the son of IFI founder Isabelo de los Reyes and grandson of Leona Florentino, the mother of Philippine women's literature.; Studied at the then-Jesuit-administered Immaculate Conception School of Theology (Vigan Seminary) during his basic education years, where his father Isabelo Sr. also studied.; Finished his theological studies at the then-seminary of the Tondo Cathedral, the IFI's first national cathedral.; Ordained into the priesthood in the IFI on September 24, 1923; was initially consecrated as bishop on January 23, 1925; and was awarded Doctor of Divinity (honoris causa) by the Central Philippine University on May 20, 1965.; Reconsecrated and bestowed with apostolic succession by the Episcopal Church on April 7, 1948.; Second longest-serving Obispo Máximo.; Also served as General Secretary prior to getting elected as Obispo Máximo.; First-ever chairperson of the National Council of Churches in the Philippines.; Nicknamed the "Father of Ecumenism in the Philippines".; Became a candidate in the 1941 Philippine Senate election.; Died in office. Shares the same death day with his father, Isabelo Sr. (October 10).; Remains interred at the María Clara Parish Church in Manila where his father is also interred.
5	Macario Vilches Ga (1913–2002)	3 November 1971 – 10 May 1981 (9 years, 188 days)	From Buenavista, Guimaras.; Third longest-serving Obispo Máximo.; Also served as General Secretary prior to getting elected as Obispo Máximo.; Seceded from the IFI and formed the Iglesia Catolica Filipina Independiente (Philippine Independent Catholic Church, currently known as the International Conference of Philippine Independent Catholic Churches of Jesus Christ).; Later reconciled with the IFI before the end of term (between 1994 and 1995) of Alberto Ramento, the ninth supreme bishop.
6	Abdias Rebantad de la Cruz (1931–2019)	10 May 1981 – 10 May 1987 (6 years, 0 days)	From New Washington, Aklan.; Also served as General Secretary prior to getting elected as Obispo Máximo.
7	Soliman Flores Ganno (1931–1989)	10 May 1987 – 26 May 1989 (2 years, 16 days)	From Bangui, Ilocos Norte.; Died in office.
8	Tito Esquillo Pasco (1930–2007)	22 June 1989 – 10 May 1993 (3 years, 322 days)	From Balasan, Iloilo.; Served the remainder of Solimán Ganno's unfinished term via special election.
9	Alberto Baldovino Ramento (1936–2006)	10 May 1993 – 10 May 1999 (6 years, 0 days)	From Guimba, Nueva Ecija.; A known human rights activist, he is the only Supreme Bishop assassinated by unknown assailants seven years after the end of his term; his case remains unsolved.; The Catholic Diocese of the Old Catholics in Germany officially canonized him as a Venerable Martyr as approved by the International Old Catholic Bishops' Conference.; Commemoration day celebrated annually every October 3.
10	Tomas Amabran Millamena (1947–2014)	10 May 1999 – 10 May 2005 (6 years, 0 days)	From Sibalom, Antique.
11	Godofredo Juico David (1956–)	10 May 2005 – 11 June 2011 (6 years, 32 days)	From Guagua, Pampanga.
12	Ephraim Servañez Fajutagana (1951–)	11 June 2011 – 25 June 2017 (6 years, 14 days)	From Odiongan, Romblon.
13	Rhee Millena Timbang (1959–)	25 June 2017 – 29 June 2023 (6 years, 4 days)	From Surigao City, Surigao del Norte.
14	Joel Ocop Porlares (1961–)	29 June 2023 – present (3 years, 76 days)	From Basey, Samar.

== Election and term of office ==
The supreme bishop is the primate, spiritual head, and chief executive of the Philippine Independent Church.

A supreme bishop is elected from the bishops of the church during the General Assembly every six years, by the delegates of every diocese, strictly via majority vote and cannot be re-elected for a consecutive term as per the church's 1977 constitution and canons which was first implemented in 1981. By tradition, the General Assembly usually elects the General Secretary (the second highest post in the church) as the next supreme bishop, but is not necessary. In the event of death or permanent disability of the sitting supreme bishop, the senior bishop-member of the Executive Commission, based on the date of consecration or seniority in age, shall automatically act as Officer-in-Charge of the church. The Executive Commission shall then elect an interim supreme bishop from its bishop-members, two weeks from such death or permanent disability. Ultimately, the Executive Commission shall convene the General Assembly for a special election of a regular supreme bishop within thirty days from the death or permanent disability. After finishing the remainder of the predecessor's term, the successor supreme bishop could seek an election on his own right.

The supreme bishop is responsible for the ecclesiastical government of the church and is the spiritual head of almost 7 million Aglipayans throughout the Philippines and some dioceses in the United States and Canada.

== See also ==
- Religion in the Philippines
- List of dioceses of the Philippine Independent Church
- President of the Catholic Bishops' Conference of the Philippines
