= Iglesia Filipina Independiente National Cathedral =

Central cathedral of the Philippine Independent Church in Manila

- Cathedral of the Holy Child
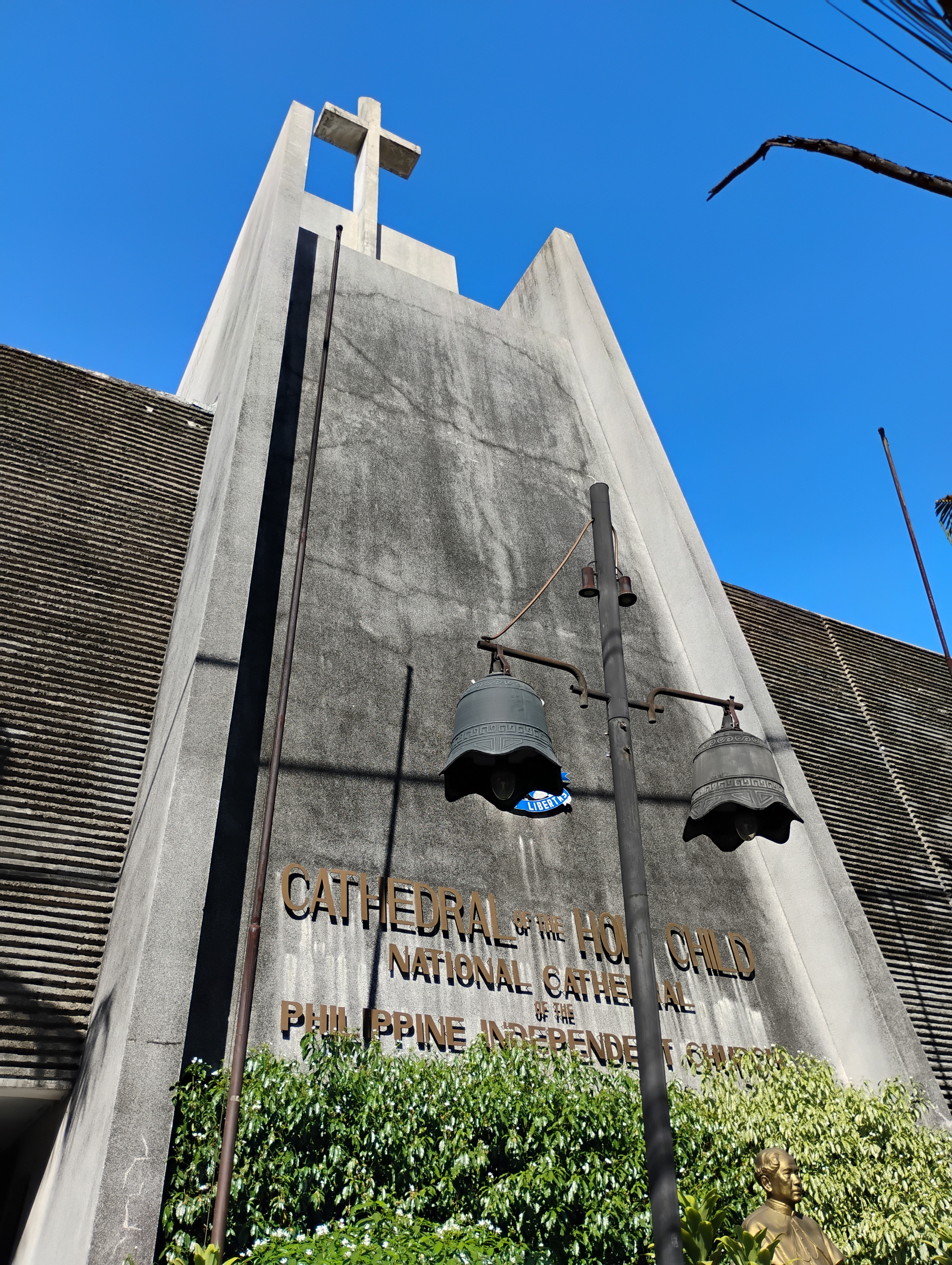
- Facade of the cathedral building in 2025

- Location in Manila Location in Metro Manila Location in Luzon Location in the Philippines
- 14°34′42″N 120°59′21″E
- Location: 1500 Taft Avenue, Ermita, Manila
- Country: Philippines
- Language(s): Filipino (lingua franca), English
- Denomination: Iglesia Filipina Independiente (Philippine Independent Church)
- Tradition: Independent Catholicism, Anglo-Catholicism, Religious nationalism, Progressive Christianity, Liberal Christianity

History
- Status: National cathedral
- Founded: January 1905 (original Tondo Cathedral); May 8, 1969 (present location)
- Founder(s): The Most Reverend Isabelo L. de los Reyes Jr., Obispo Máximo IV (present location)
- Dedication: Holy Infant Jesus
- Consecrated: May 8, 1969 (present location)

Architecture
- Functional status: Active
- Architect: Carlos D. Arguelles
- Architectural type: Church building
- Style: Modernist
- Groundbreaking: December 18, 1964
- Completed: May 8, 1969

Administration
- Diocese: Autonomous

Clergy
- Bishop(s): The Most Reverend Joel Porlares, Obispo Máximo XIV
- Dean: The Very Reverend Father Niño Franco D. Mamorbor
- Priest(s): The Reverend Jewel B. Tumaliuan, BTh, IFI (Canon); The Reverend Father Akim Jay M. Mendoza (Canon)

The Iglesia Filipina Independiente National Cathedral, canonically known as the Cathedral of the Holy Child, is the national cathedral of the Iglesia Filipina Independiente (Philippine Independent Church) and the seat of the Obispo Maximo (Supreme Bishop), the Church's chief pastor and spiritual head, located in Ermita, Manila, Philippines. It was built in 1969 and was dedicated to the honor of the Holy Infant Jesus, patron of Tondo, Manila. It replaced the first cathedral in Tondo, built in 1905, which was completely destroyed during World War II.

== History ==
=== First Central Church and Tondo Cathedral ===
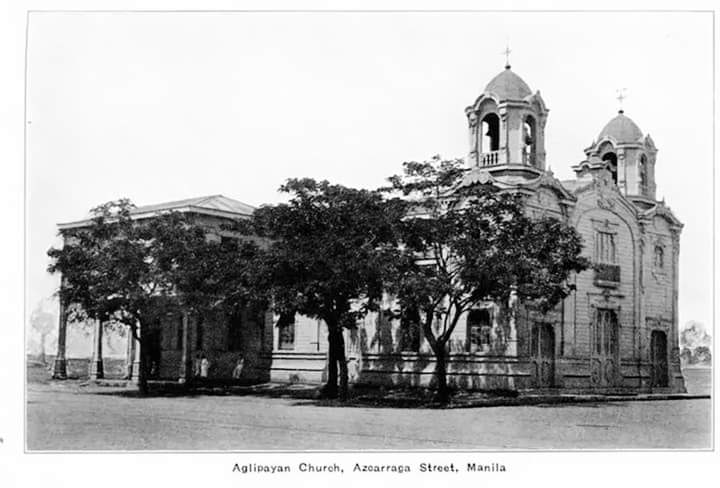
The Tondo Cathedral was the Iglesia Filipina Independiente's first national cathedral along Calle Azcarraga (now Claro M. Recto Avenue) in Tondo, Manila which was established in 1905. It was destroyed during the Second World War in 1945.

The Iglesia Filipina Independiente's first central church was actually the ground floor of a big house located at 488 Calle Lemery (now Juan Luna Street), a few meters away from Paseo de Azcarraga, in Tondo, Manila. Doña Saturnina Salazar vda. de Abreu, the mother-in-law of Felipe Buencamino and known as the wealthy and grand old lady of Tondo, was the owner. It was in that same house on October 26, 1902, where the historic grand inauguration, launching, and celebration of the first Solemn High Mass of Gregorio Aglipay, the first Supreme Bishop, was held. After the historic event, Doña Saturnina also volunteered to finance the building of the National Cathedral in a lot she voluntarily donated to the church, but without deed.

In January 1905, the National Cathedral was inaugurated and blessed. Also known as the Tondo Cathedral, the church stood on a 2,000-square-meter (22,000 sq ft) lot at 227 (formerly 111) Calle Azcarraga (now Claro M. Recto Avenue), but was totally destroyed on February 6, 1945, through the indiscriminate bombing by American forces during World War II. Felix de la Cruz was assigned as the first priest of Tondo Cathedral, where he served from 1905 until his death in 1907. He was succeeded by Santiago Fonacier, who later became the second Supreme Bishop.

With the destruction of the National Cathedral, gone too was the church's lot when it was recovered by the heirs of Saturnina Salazar. For over twenty years, the church was without a national center of worship. While there were plans to build a National Cathedral after the war, the attention of the national leadership was diverted to solve the many internal problems besetting the church. The María Clara Christ Church at V. Concepción Street in Santa Cruz, Manila served as the temporary national center of worship.

=== Construction of the National Cathedral ===
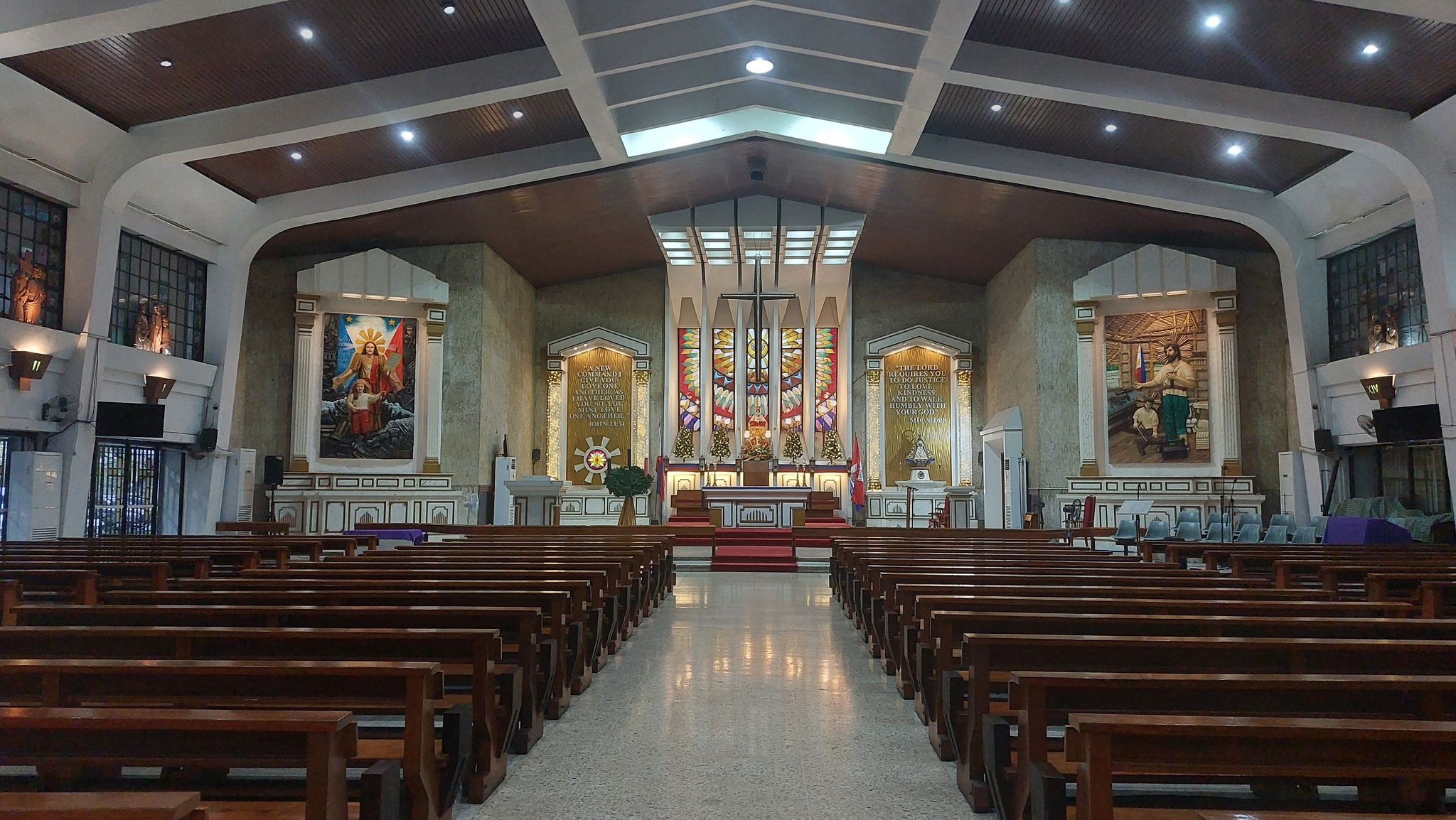
Interior and nave of the National Cathedral, 2023

On the centenary of the birth of Gregorio Aglipay in 1960, a fundraising program was launched to build a National Cathedral on a lot in Ermita, Manila owned by the Protestant Episcopal Church in the United States of America, which the latter offered to the church. The lot has an area of 3,501.50 square meters (37,689.8 sq ft). A big house used to stand on the property, which served as the official residence of the Missionary Bishop of the Episcopal Church.

The property was first leased to the church for a term of 99 years by virtue of a lease contract executed on February 25, 1966, between the Domestic and Foreign Missionary Society of the Protestant Episcopal Church in the United States of America and the Iglesia Filipina Independiente, in consideration of the sum of ₱4.00 (equivalent to ₱372.03 in 2021). The Most Rev. Isabelo L. de los Reyes Jr. (the fourth Supreme Bishop) and the Most Rev. John E. Hines (then Presiding Bishop of the Episcopal Church) respectively signed the Contract during a fitting ceremony held in Manila. In 1972, by virtue again of the said contract, the lessor Domestic and Foreign Missionary Society of the Protestant Episcopal Church in the United States of America voluntarily ceded and conveyed unto the lessee Iglesia Filipina Independiente ownership in fee simple of the said property and all improvements thereon, subject however, to certain conditions.

A groundbreaking and cornerstone laying was held for the building of the National Cathedral on December 18, 1964. Since then, a massive nationwide fundraising campaign was spearheaded by the Supreme Bishop and the National Cathedral Commission, with contributions from among the members and sympathizers of the Church. The National Cathedral was designed by architect Carlos D. Arguelles.

Coinciding with the 109th birth anniversary of the first Supreme Bishop, the National Cathedral was blessed and inaugurated on May 8, 1969. Thousands of faithful and several Catholic and Protestant church leaders throughout the world attended and joined the long procession from T.M. Kalaw Street to the site of the blessing and inauguration. The National Cathedral was dedicated to the Holy Infant Jesus, the Patron Saint of the first National Cathedral in Tondo. Almost all major newspapers covered and editorialized the historic occasion. The following day, priests Alberto Ramento, Soliman Ganno, and Admirador Fideris were consecrated to the episcopacy in the newly inaugurated national cathedral, the first bishops to be consecrated in the cathedral's history. Ramento and Ganno would eventually become supreme bishops in later years.

Bishop Soliman F. Ganno was appointed as its first Dean, having served from 1969 to 1970.

In 1973, by virtue of Motion 73-17 and following the recommendation of then-Supreme Bishop Macario V. Ga, the Supreme Council of Bishops approved that "the Cathedral of the Holy Child be autonomous and with independent Episcopal jurisdiction, having the same status of a Diocese, and, further, it shall enjoy full representation in the General Assembly of the Philippine Independent Church."

The National Cathedral is also administered by the Supreme Bishop as a separate diocese. At present, the Canon to the Supreme Bishop or Obispo Maximo serves distinctly from the Dean.

== Gallery ==
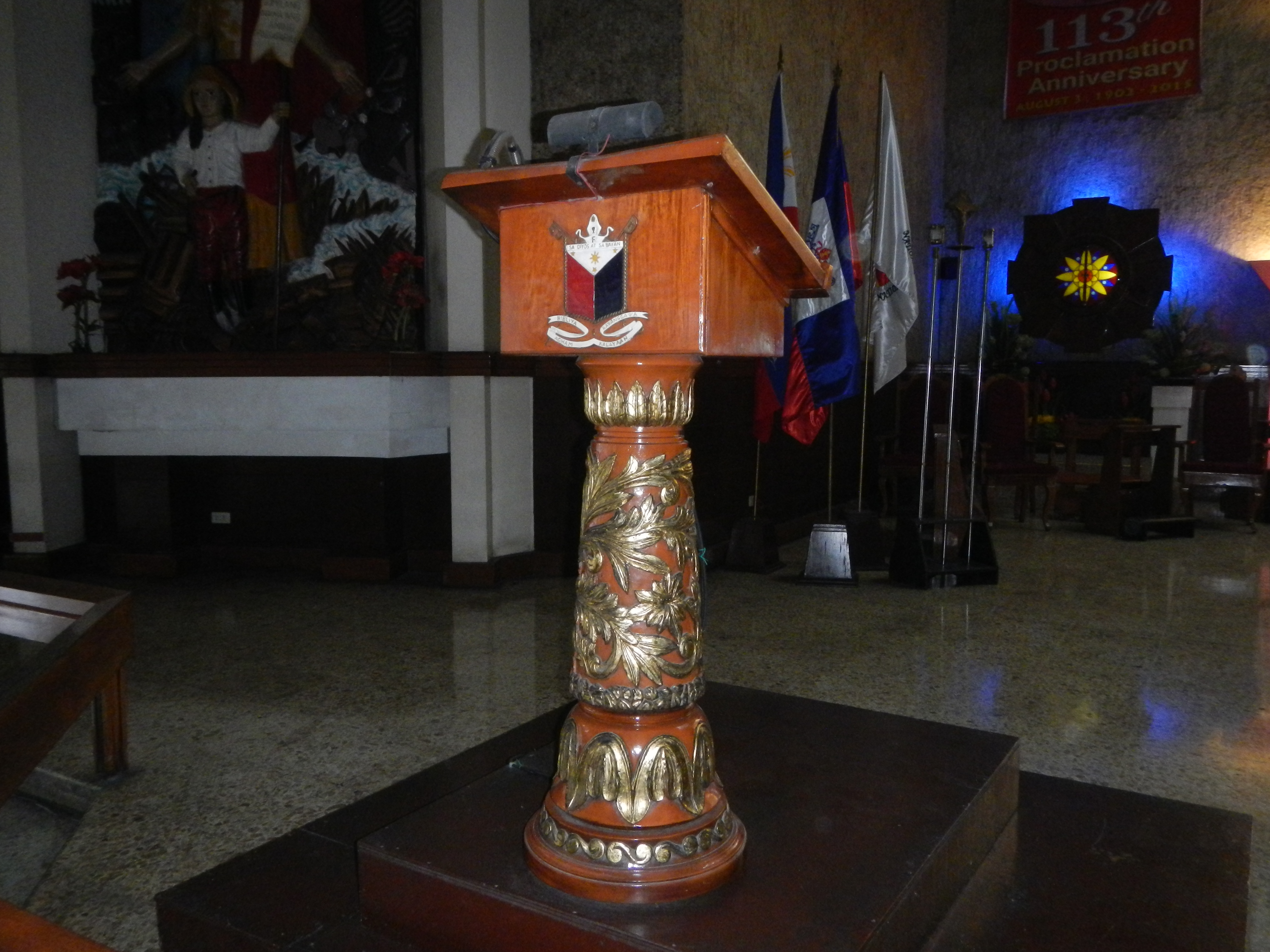
The National Cathedral's lectern or ambo

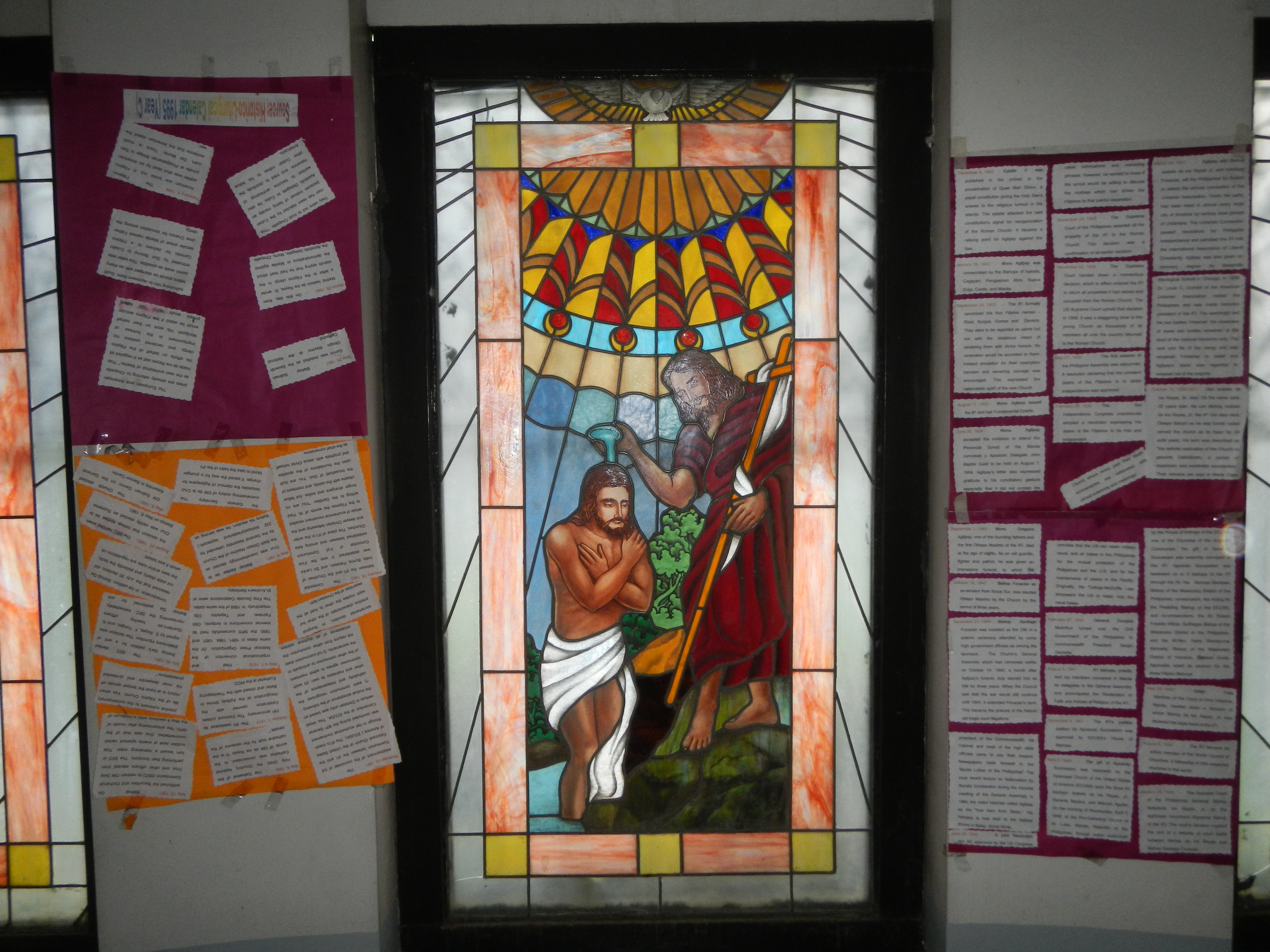
Artwork depicting the Baptism of Jesus within the baptistery inside the National Cathedral

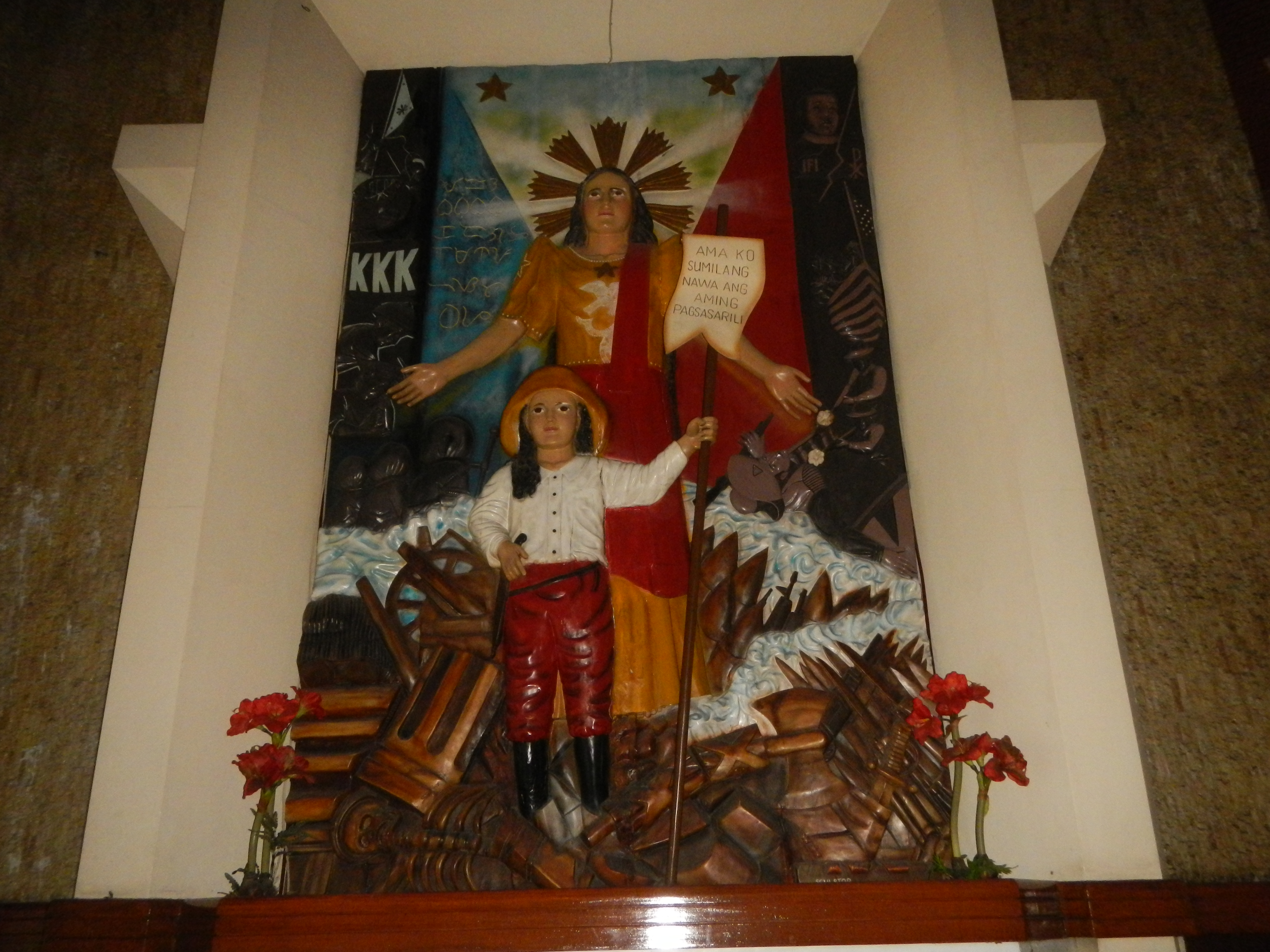
Sculpture of Ang Birhen sa Balintawak (La Hermosa Virgen de Balintawak, Our Lady of Balintawak, or Virgin of Balintawak) inside the National Cathedral

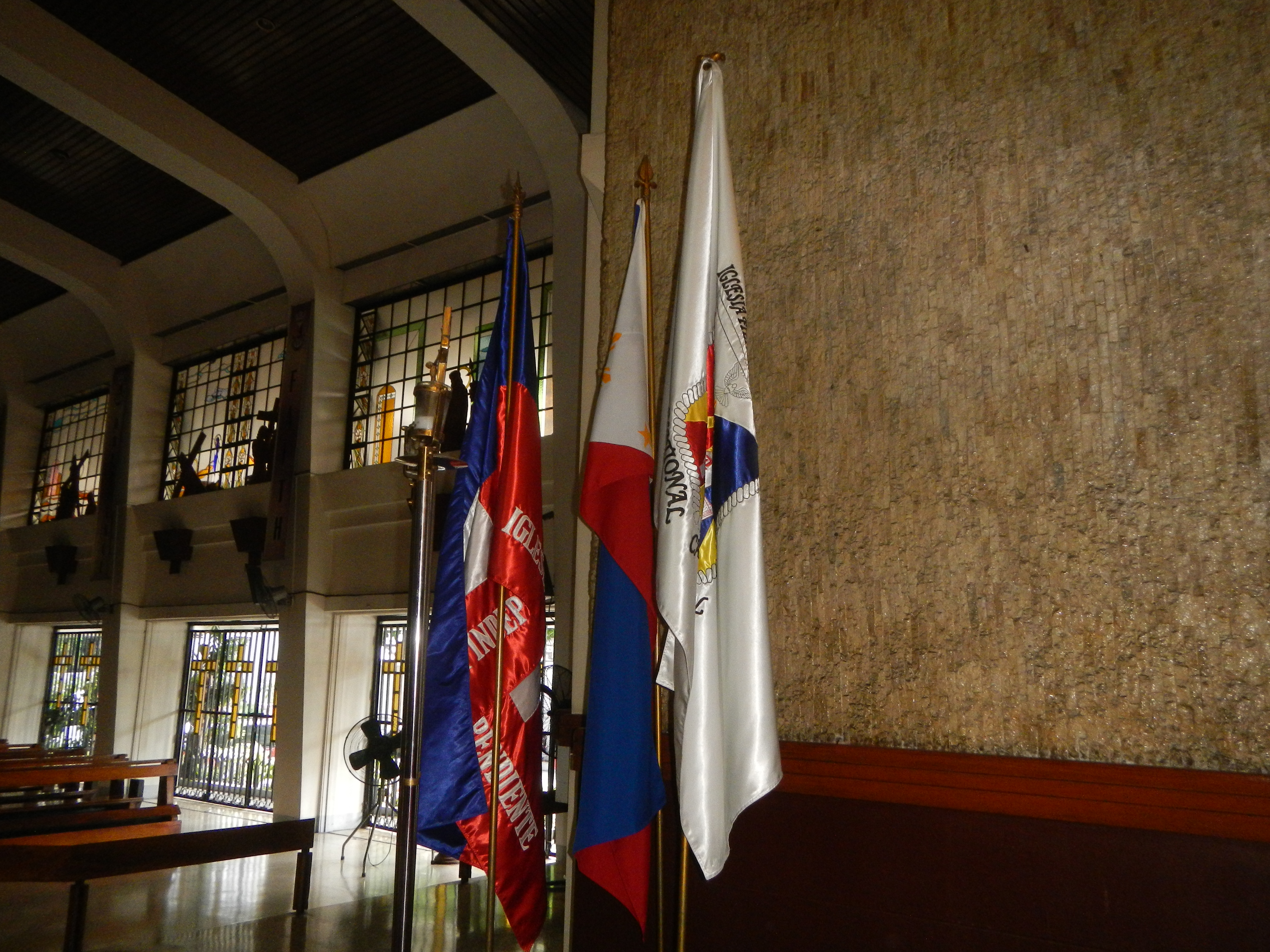
The IFI is known for employing Filipino national symbols in their church, such as the use of national colors and motifs and the displaying of the Philippine Flag in the sanctuary.

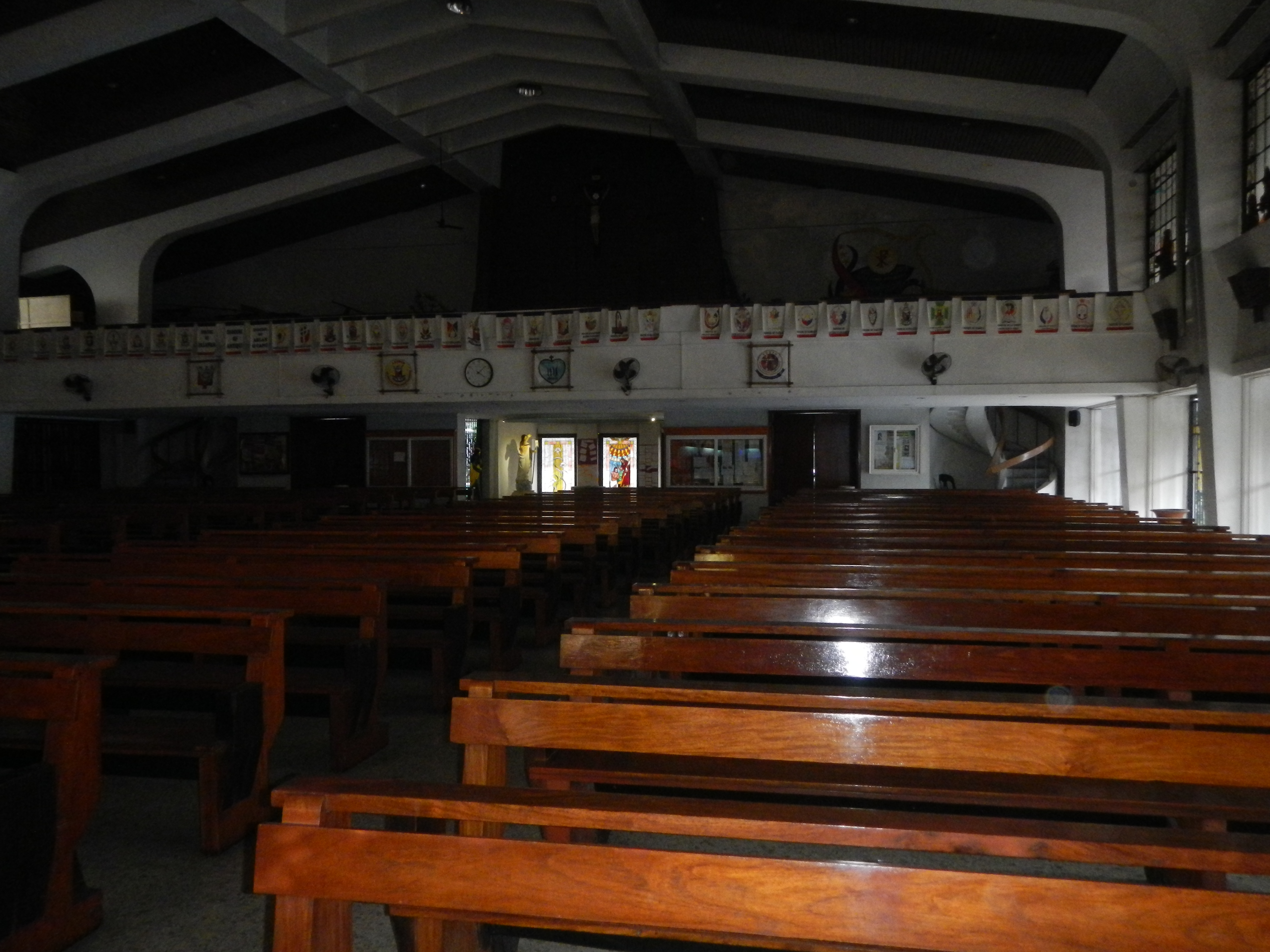
The National Cathedral's choir loft located at the rear upper floor part of the building

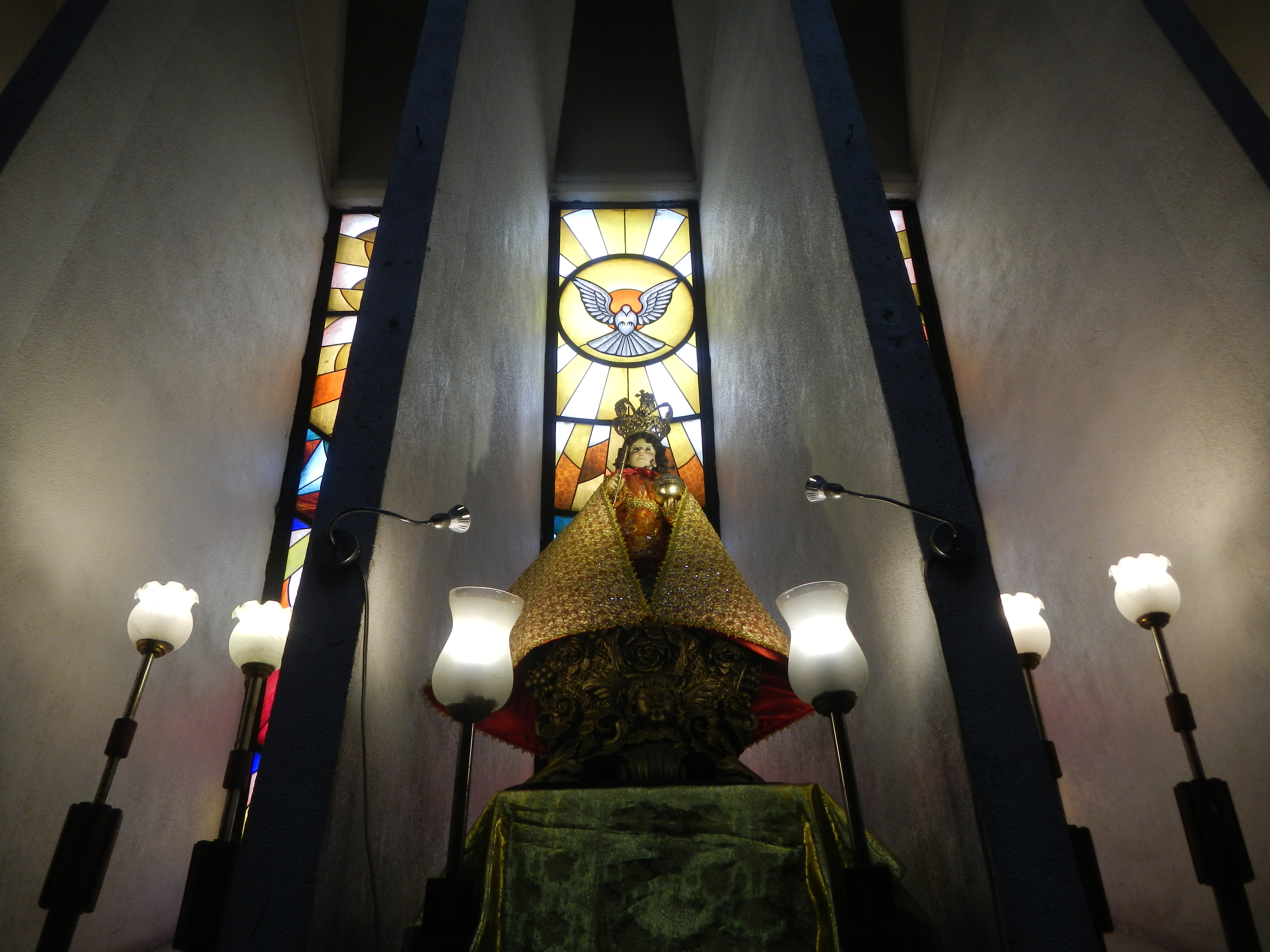
Image of the Holy Infant Jesus, to which the cathedral is dedicated to, erected inside the National Cathedral

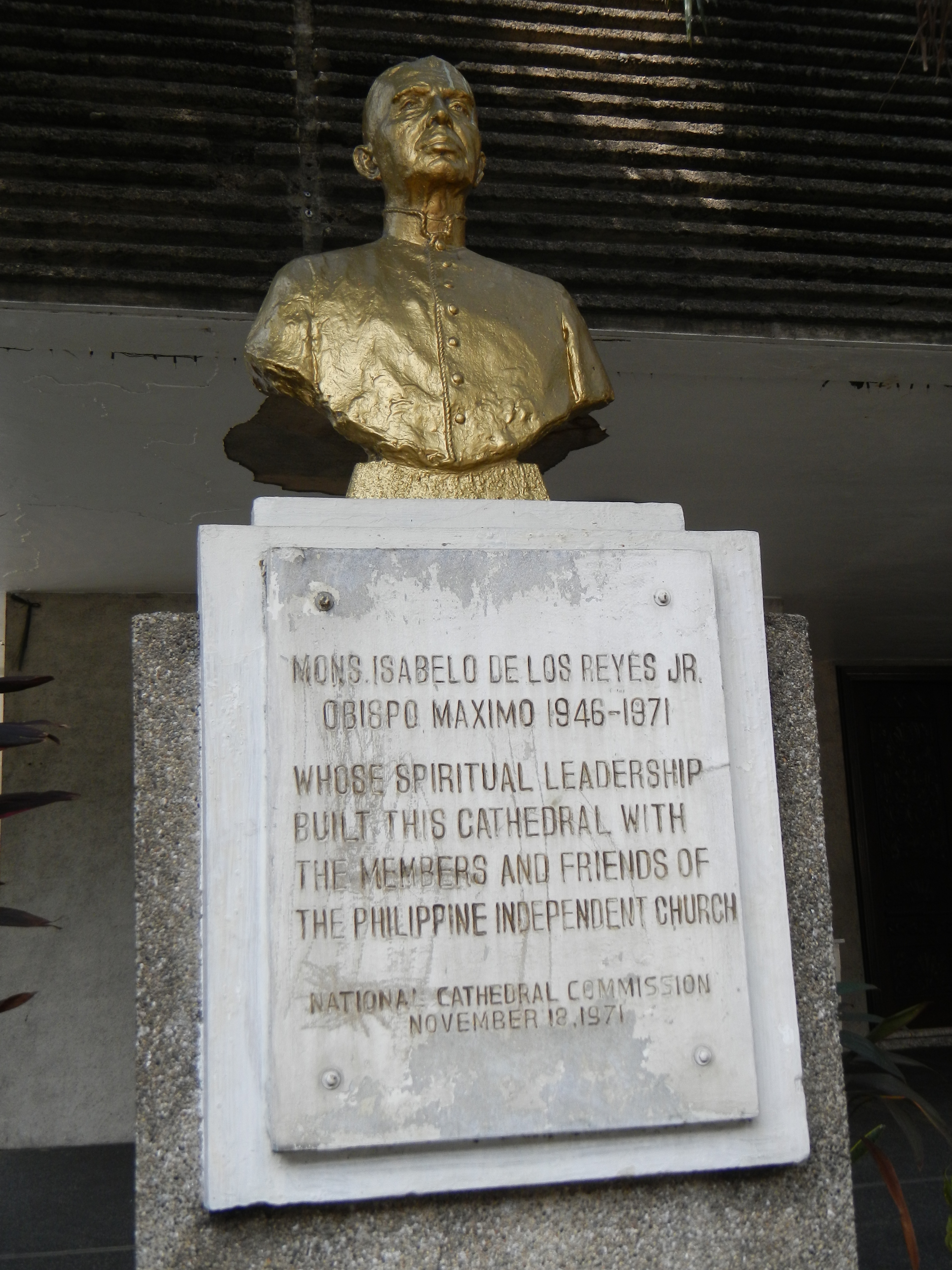
A bust of Isabelo de los Reyes Jr., Obispo Máximo IV, known as the "Father of Ecumenism in the Philippines", displayed at the vicinity of the National Cathedral

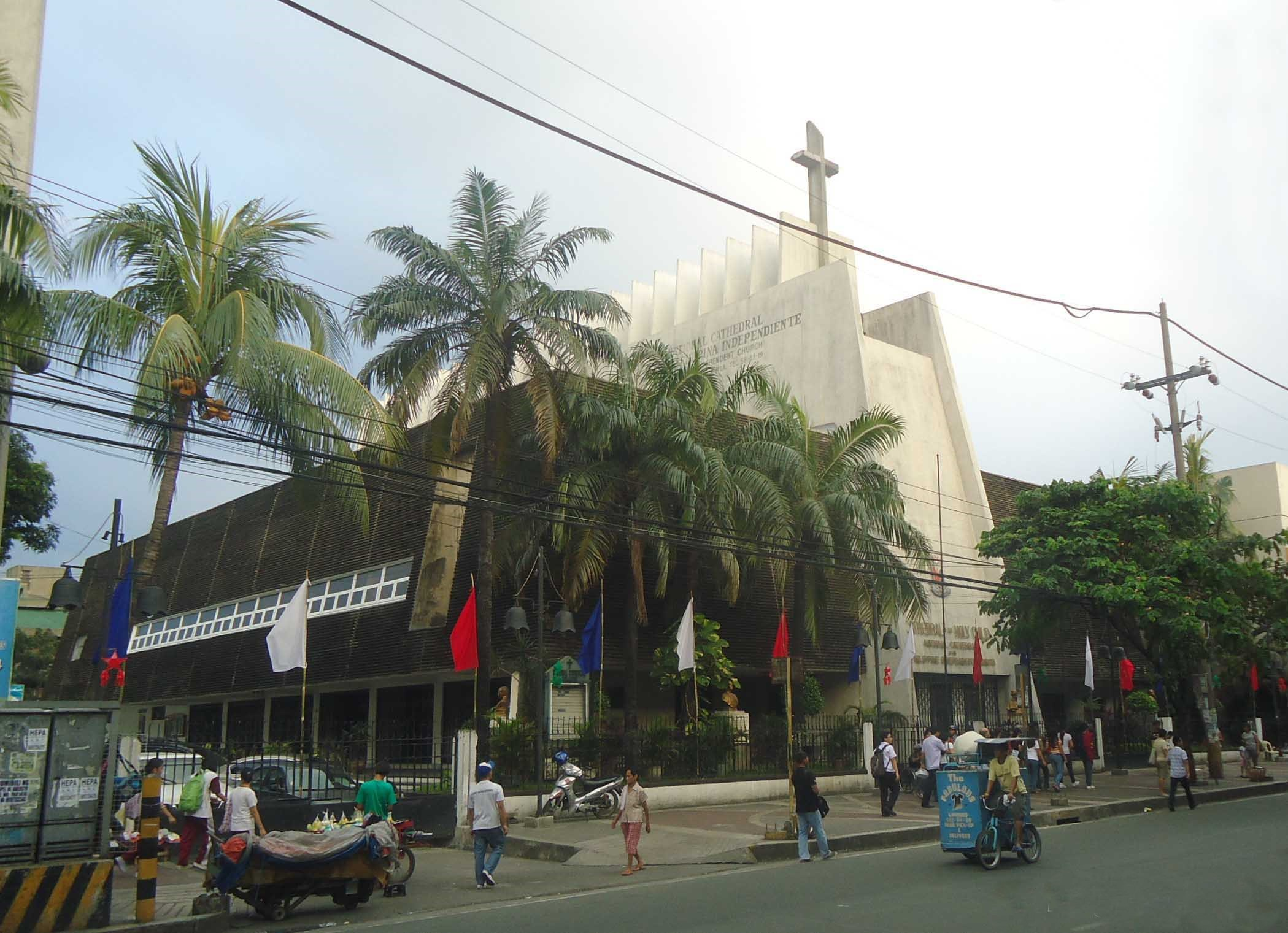
Exterior of the National Cathedral in 2011

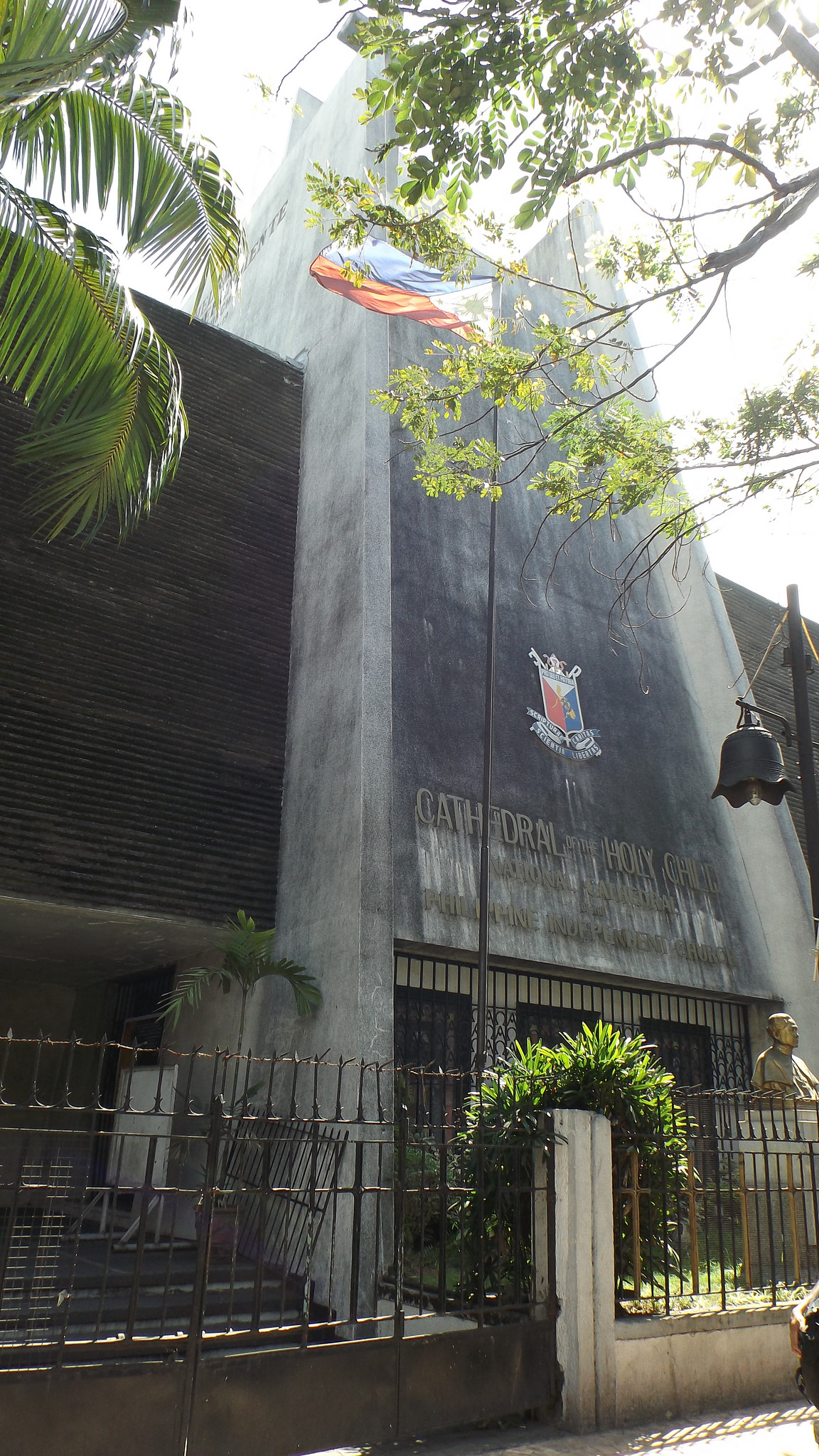
Exterior of the National Cathedral in 2015 with the Philippine flag
