= Freemasonry in the Philippines =

Freemasonry was introduced in the Philippine archipelago in 1856 during the Spanish Colonial Period, which began with various jurisdictions. Freemasonry in the Philippines started with lodges organized by Filipino expatriates in Spain under the Spanish obedience, particularly the Grande Oriente Español, it became a vital and clandestine avenue for intellectual discussion and a room for the pursuit of independence.

== Toward independence ==
The Filipinos reorganized under Grand Master Ambrocio Flores to establish the Filipino Grand Orient in 1899. During this time the Americans did not honor the existence of the First Philippine Republic despite being founded on French and American Masonic ideals behind their revolutions and the Katipunan clamoring for recognition as they once adopted Masonic rituals. Despite continued protests and appeals by the Katipunan and Filipino Masons to their brother American and European Freemasons to end hostilities and recognize the First Philippine Republic, the European and American Freemasons ignored the appeals and even worked against Philippine nationalism via the Philippine-American War and Treaty of Paris, as evidenced by the fact that the American Masonic lodges dismissed the Philippine Revolutionary Masonic lodges as "irregular" and illegitimate. For the remainder of this period, Philippine Freemasonry was subservient to the Grand Lodge of California.

On December 19, 1912, the Grand Lodge of the Philippine Islands was formed by three American lodges: Manila 342, Cavite 350, and Corregidor 386, with Manila becoming Manila Lodge No 1. At first, Grand Lodge remained a Regional Grand Lodge, convoking its own Grand Assembly in 1915. Throughout 1915 and 1916 it was engaged with correspondence with the Grande Oriente Español in Spain, with aims toward its own independence. The long process of establishing the proper agreements finished in February 1917. The American Grand Lodge Constitution was used as a basis, keeping in mind issues such as equality of all races and working languages for ceremonies. In the same month, a group of 27 lodges still under the Grande Oriente Español elected to affiliate under the Philippine Grand Lodge and Grand Officers were elected.

== Second World War ==
For a time before and after the war, the Philippine Grand Lodge also held jurisdiction over some lodges in other countries such as China and Japan before those places established their own grand lodges. Their constitutions were often based on the Philippine one, as well as others such as that of the Grand Lodge of California.

== Notable members ==
National Heroes

- Jose Rizal – national hero, physician, and writer
- Andres Bonifacio – national hero and founder of Katipunan
- Graciano Lopez Jaena - leader of the Propaganda Movement
- Marcelo H. Del Pilar - Father of Philippine Freemasonry
- Mariano Ponce - co-founder of La Solidaridad, physician, and writer
- Apolinario Mabini - Brains of the Revolution and First Prime Minister of the Philippines
- Juan Luna - painter
- Antonio Luna - Filipino Army General and pharmacist
- Jose Abad Santos - Supreme Court Chief Justice and a national hero during Japanese Occupation Period
- Vicente Lim - Army general and a national hero during Japanese Occupation Period

Prominent Ilustrados

- Pedro Paterno - 2nd Prime Minister of the Philippines, novelist, and poet
- Jacobo Zóbel - Filipino nationalist, businessman, and pharmacist
- Trinidad Pardo de Tavera - Deputy Prime Minister of the First Philippine Republic, physician, and historian
- José Alejandrino - member of the Propaganda Movement, Army general, and senator

Philippine Presidents

- Emilio Aguinaldo – 1st President of the First Philippine Republic
- Manuel L. Quezon - 2nd President of the Philippines
- Jose P. Laurel - 3rd President of the Philippines
- Sergio Osmeña - 4th President of the Philippines
- Manuel A. Roxas - 5th President of the Philippines

== See also ==
- Katipunan
- List of Freemasons

== Sources ==
- "Historia | Gran Logia Nacional de Filipinas". glnf.ph.
