= Quijano =

Surname

Quijano is a surname. Notable people with the surname include:

- Anibal Quijano (1930–2018), Peruvian sociologist and humanist thinker
- Annette Quijano (born 1962), American Democratic Party politician
- Carlos Quijano (1900–1984), Uruguayan lawyer, politician, essayist and journalist
- Diana Quijano (born 1962), Peruvian actress
- Douglas Quijano (1944–2009), talent manager
- Elaine Quijano (born 1974), American journalist
- Fernando Quijano (1805–1871), Uruguayan songwriter
- Gedeon G. Quijano (1910–1989), American physician, lawyer, engineer and writer
- Hortensio Quijano (1884–1952), Vice President of Argentina, 1946–52
- Marvin Quijano (born 1979), Salvadoran football player

== Fictional characters ==
- Alonso Quijano, real name of Don Quijote, leading character of the novel Don Quijote de la Mancha

== See also ==
- Café Quijano, Spanish pop band formed by three brothers, Manuel, Óscar and Raúl Quijano
- Campo Quijano, town and municipality in Salta Province in northwestern Argentina

Media related to Quijano (surname) at Wikimedia Commons
