= Philippine Independent Church =

Major independent Christian denomination based in the Philippines

Philippine Independent Church
- Iglesia Filipina Independiente (Spanish); Malayang Simbahan ng Pilipinas (Filipino)
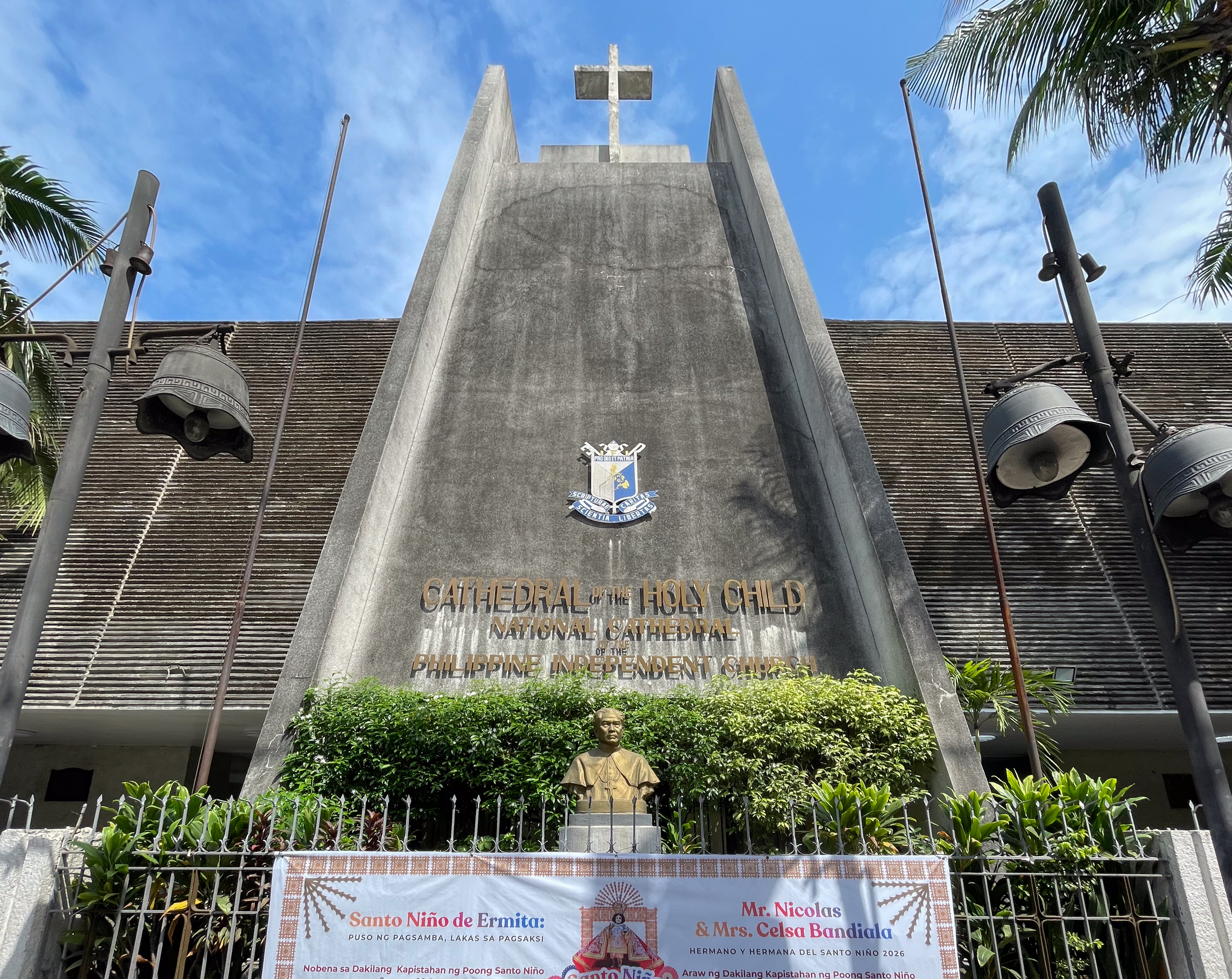
- Façade of the National Cathedral of the Holy Child in Ermita, Manila
- Abbreviation: IFI, PIC
- Type: Christian (Western)
- Classification: Catholicity, Protestantism (formerly on its earliest years (Note: From its original provenance in 1902 to 1907 and during its brief Unitarian phase from 1907 until 1947. Ceased to self-identify as Protestant from 1947 to present but maintains ecumenical ties with various Protestant churches.))
- Orientation: Mix of Independent Catholic, Anglo-Catholic, Nationalist, Progressive, Liberal
- Scripture: Holy Bible (Note: GNB, MBB, RSV, NRSV, NIV, IFI Commemorative Bible.)
- Theology: Trinitarian (Note: 1902–1907; 1947–present.) (with theological and doctrinal identity based from the Chalcedonian, Anglican, and Catholic theologies), Independent catholic doctrine, Liberation theology
- Polity: Episcopal
- Governance: Synod (General Assembly)
- Structure: Communion
- Supreme Bishop: Joel O. Porlares
- General Secretary: Dindo D. Ranojo
- Supreme Council of Bishops Chairperson: Rowel S. Arevalo
- Administration: The IFI General Assembly; IFI Executive Commission
- Dioceses: Local dioceses: 52 (clustered into regional bishops conferences); Overseas dioceses: 2; Total: 54; Overseas organized congregations: 5
- Associations: National Council of Churches in the Philippines; Christian Conference of Asia; World Council of Churches; United Society Partners in the Gospel; Council of Churches of East Asia
- Full communion: See list
- Region: Philippines; North America; Europe; Middle East; East Asia; Southeast Asia; Pacific Islands
- Language: Filipino (lingua franca), Native Philippine regional languages, English, Philippine Spanish, Latin
- Liturgy: The Filipino Ritual and The Filipino Missal by the Iglesia Filipina Independiente, 1961
- Headquarters: Iglesia Filipina Independiente National Cathedral of the Holy Child #1500 Taft Avenue, Ermita, Manila, Philippines
- Founder: Unión Obrera Democrática Filipina; Isabelo F. de los Reyes, Sr.; Gregorio L. Aglipay
- Origin: August 3, 1902; Quiapo, Manila, Philippine Islands
- Independence: From the See of Rome: Since the 20th century; 124 years ago (Autocephalous Filipino leadership since)
- Separated from: Catholic Church
- Separations: List: Iglesia de la Libertad (1938, small minority); Independent Church of Filipino Christians / Aglipay Memorial Church (ICFC / AMC) (1955, small minority); Church Body of Christ – Filipinista (1966, small minority); Holy Catholic Apostolic Christian Church (HCAC) (1966, small minority); Philippine Independent Catholic Church (Iglesia Catolica Filipina Independiente) – PICC/ICFI (Note: Now formally known as the "International Conference of Philippine Independent Catholic Churches of Jesus Christ".) (1981); Aglipayan Christian Church Inc. (Legion of Mary) (1995, small minority); 63rd and Mothers Apostolic Church of the Philippines (2000s faction, small minority); At least 30 other minor "Aglipayan" offshoots, breakaway factions, sects, and splinter groups all over the Philippines not in communion with the IFI, which is the legally-declared "mother church"
- Members: 1,458,992 (IFI and Aglipay) (2020 census); 6-7 million (per WCC and 2023 internal estimate)
- Aid organization: IFI – Task Force on Emergency Relief (IFI–TFER); IFI Concern and Advocacy for Relief & Resiliency, Empowerment, and Sustainability (IFI CARES)
- Seminaries: 2 (plus 1 joint seminary with the Episcopal Church in the Philippines)
- Other names: Aglipayan Church; "Mainstream/Mainline Aglipayan Church"; "Mother Aglipayan Church"; "Native/Indigenous Filipino Catholic Church"
- Publications: The Christian Register; The Sower
- Official website: www.ifico.ph
- Slogan: Latin: Pro Deo et Patria - Scripturae, Scientia, Libertas, Caritas
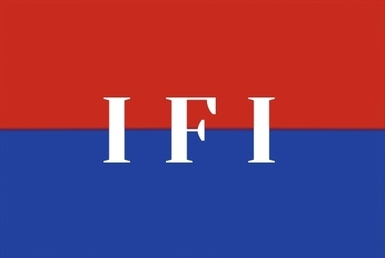
- Slogan/Mottos in English: "For God and Fatherland - Scripture, Charity, Knowledge, Liberty" Official flag of the IFI

The Philippine Independent Church (Filipino: Malayang Simbahan ng Pilipinas; Ilocano: Nawaya a Simbaan ti Filipinas), officially referred to by its Philippine Spanish name Iglesia Filipina Independiente (IFI) and colloquially called the Aglipayan Church, is an independent catholic (Note: The Philippine Independent Church is a catholic religious denomination that does not subject its episcopal authority to the Pope (Bishop of Rome).) Christian denomination, in the form of a nationalist church, (Note: Not to be confused with "national church" and Christian nationalism. During its earlier years, the Philippine Independent Church leadership had planned to propose to the Philippine government to make the Church as the national church of the Philippines, however, the proposal was discontinued when the Constitution of the Philippines in the post-colonial era had since ratified that "the constitution provides for the free exercise of religion and religious worship and prohibits the establishment of a state religion. Additionally, no religious test is required for the exercise of civil or political rights. Furthermore, the constitution provides for the separation of religion and state.") in the Philippines. Its revolutionary nationalist schism from the Catholic Church in the Philippines was proclaimed during the American colonial period in 1902, following the end of the Philippine–American War, by members of the country's first labor union federation, the Unión Obrera Democrática Filipina.

The foundation of the church was a response to the historical mistreatment and racial discrimination of Filipinos by Spaniard priests and partly influenced by the unjust executions of José Rizal and Filipino priests and prominent secularization movement figures Mariano Gomez, José Burgos, and Jacinto Zamora, during the former Spanish colonial rule in the country when Catholicism was still the state religion. In the 2020 census, 640,076 people self-identified as members of the IFI, while an additional 818,916 persons self-identified as "Aglipay," totaling 1,458,992 people.

== Overview ==
The Filipino historian Teodoro Agoncillo has described the Philippine Independent Church as "the only living and tangible result of the Philippine Revolution". Ever since its inception, the IFI Aglipayanism (Note: "Aglipayanism", a colloquial term which sometimes refers to the movement or tradition to which the IFI/PIC belongs.) is widely characterized as a schismatic, rather than a heretical movement, although the church itself and its congregation distance themselves from the "schismatic" description and prefers the term "independence" instead. Despite not being in full communion with the Catholic Church, the Philippine Independent Church universally maintains and adheres to the core set of beliefs and practices of broader catholicity.

The Philippine Independent Church is the country's first and oldest wholly Filipino-led independent Christian church. Its central office is located at the National Cathedral of the Holy Child in Ermita, Manila. At present, it is ecumenically in full communion with the worldwide Anglican Communion, the third largest Christian communion in the world, while still maintaining its independence as per their concordat and does not require from either the acceptance of all doctrinal opinions. Although marked with Anglican influence, the Philippine Independent Church had come to develop its own liturgy, traditions, and theology distinct from Anglicanism. While Trinitarian, the Philippine Independent Church had unofficially shifted to a Unitarian theological doctrine briefly during its earliest years before reverting to Trinitarianism in 1947.

The Philippine Independent Church has historically been involved in social and political issues in the Philippines, advocating for workers' rights, social justice, and nationalism. It has supported movements for land reform, sustainable development, indigenous rights, and workers' rights, making it one of the more socially active churches in the country.

== History ==
=== Gregorio Aglipay and the Philippine Revolution ===
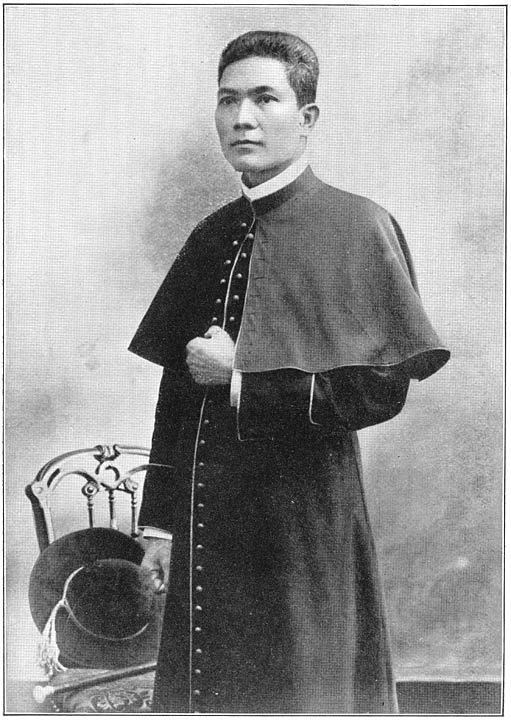
Gregorio Aglipay in his middle age as supreme bishop

Gregorio Aglipay was an activist and Latin Catholic priest from Ilocos Norte, who would later be excommunicated by then Archbishop of Manila, Bernardino Nozaleda, for "usurpation of ecclesiastical jurisdiction" by joining Emilio Aguinaldo's libertarian movement and suspicion in possibly fomenting schism with the Pope (then Pope Leo XIII) in 1899 at the height of the Philippine–American War.

During the earlier Philippine Revolution, Aglipay and his former college schoolmate and fellow anti-friar Isabelo de los Reyes (also known as Don Belong), an ilustrado author, journalist, and labour activist who was in exile in Spain at the time, acted to reform the Filipino Catholic clergy which was then dominated and controlled by Spanish friars ("frailocracy") as Catholicism was the state religion at the time of the Spanish colonial period in the Philippines. At the time, the vast majority of native Filipino priests were already prohibited from administering a parish since 1870 and served only as coadjutors or just assistants to the Spanish friars. Native priests were also denied consecration to the episcopacy. Then-President Emilio Aguinaldo persuaded Aglipay to head the native Filipino clergy by appointing him military vicar general of the Philippine Revolution in 1898, wishing to overthrow the spiritual power of the Spanish friar-bishops.

Aglipay was a member of the Malolos Congress, the lone member coming from the religious sector, although he also represented his home province, as well.

Aglipay was also a guerrilla leader during the Philippine–American War, with the rank of lieutenant-general. He was also the convener of the Filipino Ecclesiastical Council (Paniqui Assembly) on October 23, 1899, months following his excommunication, in response to the manifesto of former Prime Minister Apolinario Mabini, who first came up with the idea of urging the Filipino clergy to organize a "Filipino national church" as inspired by the secularization movement, but not necessarily a schism from Rome. The idea received support from Aguinaldo. The assembly was attended by 28 native Filipino priests, thus, the short-lived national church was materialized. However, it was disestablished in 1901 following the dissolution of the First Philippine Republic.

=== Post-excommunication and establishment of the Church by Isabelo de los Reyes and the Unión Obrera Democrática ===
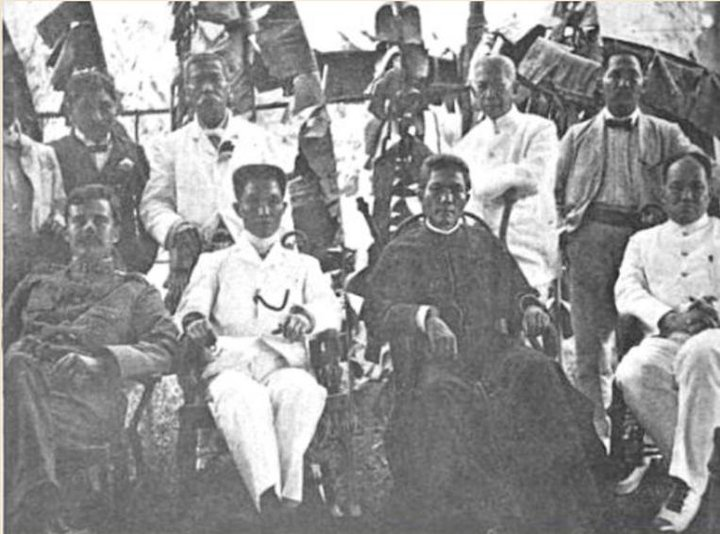
President Emilio Aguinaldo and Supreme Bishop Gregorio Aglipay (seated, second and third from left respectively), with some Cabinet officials of the First Philippine Republic, December 1904.

Following the end of the Philippine–American War, Isabelo de los Reyes, together with the members of Unión Obrera Democrática Filipina, formally founded and publicly proclaimed the commencement of the Iglesia Filipina Independiente (abbreviated as IFI and translated to "Philippine Independent Church" in English) on August 3, 1902, at the Centro de Bellas Artes in Quiapo, Manila. The new church faced opposition from the colonial government, which sought to maintain the status quo. The church was later incorporated with the then-Insular Government of the Philippines as a religious corporation sole in 1904. The new church rejected the spiritual authority and infallibility of the Pope and abolished the celibacy requirement for priests, allowing them to marry. At that time, even before Aglipay joined the movement, all of its clergy were former Catholic priests, mostly from Ilocos, with some of whom became the church's first ever nominated and elected bishops by its earliest batch of clergy and laity who mostly belong to various political parties in Manila. Among the first elected bishops was former Latin Catholic priest and vicar forane Pedro Brillantes. The elected bishops then formed the church's first Supreme Council of Bishops. De los Reyes also formed an Executive Committee for the church from the staff of the Unión Obrera Democrática Filipina who drafted the church's early first two Fundamental Epistles, which were thereafter approved by the Supreme Council of Bishops. The elected bishops were then consecrated by several other priests, as justified in accordance with the Fundamental Epistles. The first ever bishop to be consecrated in the IFI was Pedro Brillantes, whose consecration took place on October 20, 1902, and proclaimed Bacarra, Ilocos Norte as his episcopal seat. All of the former Latin Catholic clergy who joined the movement were later declared excommunicated by the Catholic Church.

Isabelo de los Reyes was the chief initiator of the separation and suggested, in absentia, that Gregorio Aglipay, knowing that he was influential with the Filipino clergy, should be the founding head, or Obispo Maximo (Supreme Bishop), of the church, a proposal that was unanimously agreed upon by the members present at the proclamation. De los Reyes' desire to form a new church was conceptualized upon his repatriation to the Philippines from Spain in 1901 after his talks in 1899 with Giuseppe Francica-Nava de Bontifè, then the Apostolic Nuncio to Spain, to request the Holy See in looking into the conditions of the Philippines had failed. By then, the country had changed from Spanish rule to American. Although the American concept of separation of church and state was introduced in the Philippine Constitution of 1899, Spanish friars were still in control of the parishes all throughout the country, and de los Reyes feared that American clergy would sooner or later replace the Spanish, instead of native Filipinos. Along with the American colonization was the arrival of the American Protestant missionaries in the Philippines starting in 1901. De los Reyes envisioned the new church as a significant move towards Filipino sovereignty, not just politically but also spiritually.

De los Reyes managed to rally enough people from his organization, Unión Obrera Democrática Filipina, the first modern labor union federation in the country wherein he was its first president, to materialize an independent and purely Filipino-led church "conserving all that is good in the Roman Church and eliminating all the deceptions which the Romanists had introduced to corrupt the moral purity and sacredness of the doctrines of Christ." At the time, he had the necessary logistics and resources needed to form a new Filipino-led church, but one: an equipped and empowered bishop to head it.

At first, the already-excommunicated Aglipay was reluctant, as he was initially against a schism and was faithful to the magisterium. He believed that all means of reaching an understanding with Rome should be exhausted first before declaring any schism. Doubting that Aglipay might not take the leadership, the church elected its first batch of bishops, with Pedro Brillantes as the first ever to be consecrated. However, after Aglipay's talks with Jesuit and American Protestant leaders quickly backfired when both were dismissive and would not allow native Filipino priests to lead their respective churches, he eventually accepted de los Reyes' offer to head the independent church and was proclaimed as a bishop by the Supreme Council of Bishops of the newly-formed church on September 6, 1902, while also serving as the de facto "supreme bishop" until he was finally consecrated to the position by his fellow other bishops on January 18, 1903. Thus, the denomination also became known as the "Aglipayan Church", after its first supreme bishop.

Aglipay celebrated his first mass as the de facto Supreme Bishop on October 26, 1902 in the IFI's first central church at Calle Lemery in Tondo, Manila. During his first mass, Apolinario Mabini, who was in exile at the time and in bad health condition, sent a letter of encouragement to the new church. Isabelo de los Reyes himself would later be formally excommunicated from the Catholic Church in 1903. De los Reyes assumed the role of the de facto principal theologian, as well as a lay leader, in the church. On October 1, 1902, Aglipay headed the signatories, approval, and promulgation of the very first and short-lived temporary Constitution of the Iglesia Filipina Independiente. Subsequently, Aglipay also formally signed the third up to the sixth and last Fundamental Epistles. In late 1902, the church opened a seminary which was later renamed Seminario Central de Mabini in 1917 (predecessor of present-day Aglipay Central Theological Seminary), named after Apolinario Mabini, at Nancamaliran West, Urdaneta, Pangasinan. With its nationwide campaign, the IFI was able to gain roughly three to five million followers all over the country on its first year of separation from the Catholic Church. All of which are former Catholics, including priests.

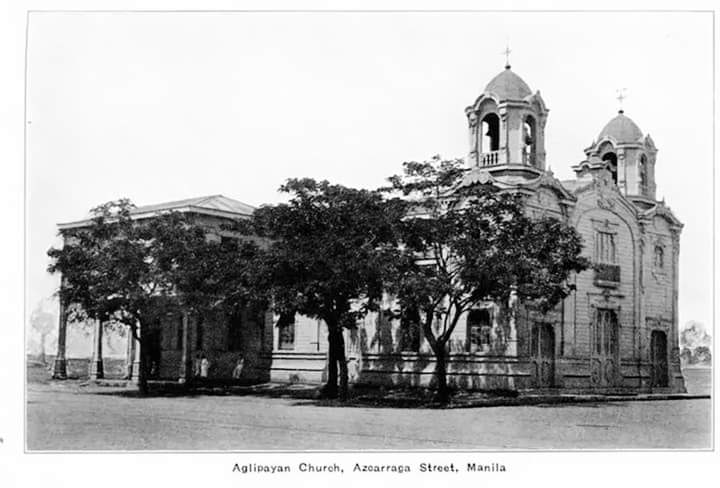
The Tondo Cathedral was the Iglesia Filipina Independiente's first national cathedral along Calle Azcarraga (now Claro M. Recto Avenue) in Tondo, Manila which was established in 1905. It was heavily destroyed during the Second World War in 1945. It was later replaced by the National Cathedral of the Holy Child in Ermita, Manila.

Immediately after accepting the post, Aglipay demanded both then Governor-General William Howard Taft and Catholic Church authorities to turn-over the church buildings to him on September 27, 1902, starting with the Manila Cathedral, but got rejected. A five-year campaign resulted in the acquisition of nearly one-half of Catholic church properties in the country by Aglipay's followers. However, in 1906, the then-conservative Supreme Court of the Philippines ruled that all property that had been occupied by Aglipay's followers had to be returned to the Catholic Church. The Supreme Court of the United States upheld the decision in 1909. The Aglipayan Church was then forced to move to makeshift quarters, with only a handful of followers able to retain the occupied buildings.

=== Developing early theology ===
On October 28, 1903, the IFI adopted the Doctrina y Reglas Constitucionales (DRC), which replaced the Fundamental Epistles as the doctrinal foundation and governing rules of the Church, with slight revisions in 1918 and 1940.

Aglipay, like José Rizal, later became a Freemason in May 1918. Although not a Mason himself, de los Reyes — who created a distinct doctrine, liturgy, and organization for the Philippine Independent Church — drew on aspects of their theology and worship, which was then approved formally by Aglipay. De los Reyes was supported by Miguel Morayta, Grand Master of the Spanish Orient Lodge of Freemasonry in Madrid. The Jesuit historian John N. Schumacher contended that Morayta and other non-Filipino Masons and secular laymen pushed Aglipay and de los Reyes towards schism from the Catholic Church because of their resentment towards the activities of Catholic religious orders in the Philippines, rather than any simple admiration and encouragement for Filipino nationalism. Aglipay in 1929 titled de los Reyes, who remained a layman, as an Obispo Honorario (Honorary Bishop).

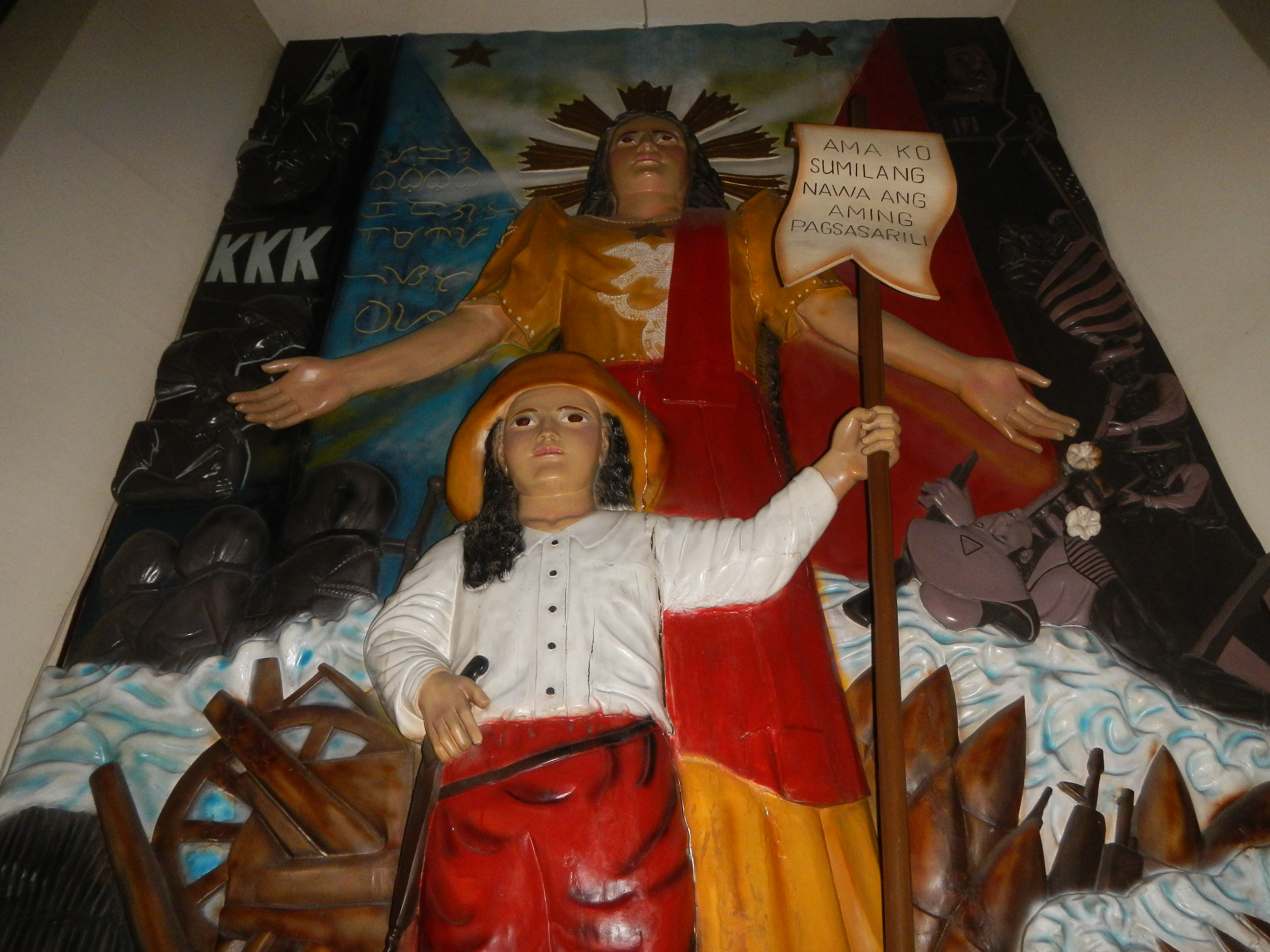
Representation of "Ang Birhen ng Balintawak" ("Virgin of Balintawak" or "Our Lady of Balintawak"), an icon of the Iglesia Filipina Independiente which is believed to be a Marian apparition during the Philippine Revolution. It depicts an indigenous Virgin Mary, as the mother of a struggling nation dressed in traditional Filipina dress, with her Son, the Divine Infant, attired as a Katipunero.

From 1902 to 1907, the Church was Trinitarian and largely followed Catholic forms of worship. It reformed the Latin Tridentine liturgy, and the Mass in its earliest days was said both in Spanish and the vernacular. Aglipay and de los Reyes later amended their theology, coming to reject the divinity of Jesus and the Holy Trinity, becoming theologically (though not officially) Unitarian in 1907. Aglipay and de los Reyes' Unitarian, rationalist, and progressive theological views were already evident in the church's Catecismo de la Iglesia Filipina Independiente (1905), Oficio Divino (1906), and subsequently the novena, Pagsisiyam sa Birhen sa Balintawak (1925), as well as its English translation, Novenary of the Motherland (1926). However, a significant number of the Church's population refused to accept the new Unitarian theology, and continued to profess Trinitarianism.

De los Reyes held the position of Honorary Bishop until his death on October 10, 1938. There were claims that he allegedly recanted and returned to the Catholic Church two years before his death. However, his son, Isabelo de los Reyes Jr., who later became Supreme Bishop, vehemently denied the claims. Aglipay, meanwhile, was Supreme Bishop until his own death on September 1, 1940.

=== Ecumenism, factionalism, and schism into offshoot Aglipayan sects ===
From its early years, two principal factions coexisted uneasily within the IFI and had become even more apparent after Isabelo Sr. and Aglipay's death: one Unitarian (led by Aglipay's successor and former personal secretary, cleric-turned-politician, and second supreme bishop, Santiago Fonacier – who was elected after Aglipay's death in accordance with the constitution of the church and was faithful to Aglipay and Isabelo Sr.'s theology), and the other, Trinitarian (led by Isabelo de los Reyes Jr. – the church's then-general secretary who was elected the fourth supreme bishop in 1946).

Before being elected, Fonacier initially committed to steer the IFI back to Trinitarism, however during his tenure, his theological and doctrinal stance was evidently still leaning towards his predecessor's Unitarian beliefs. On January 21, 1946, Fonacier was ousted from his position after a unanimous decree by the church's Supreme Council of Bishops due to controversies regarding certain decisions he imposed, which were deemed allegedly unconstitutional. A schism developed at the tail-end of Fonacier's term, and the Unitarian faction, which included bishop Juan V. Jamias (Aglipay's brother-in-law and brother of Aglipay's wife Pilar Jamias), left the church, claiming the right to the name and possession of church properties. Gerardo Bayaca served as interim supreme bishop until he was succeeded by Isabelo de los Reyes Jr. Under Isabelo Jr.'s leadership, the church's affiliation with revolutionary movements were severed and abrogated, coupled with his pursuit for ecumenism.

On August 4, 1947, a year after the granting of full independence of the Philippines from the United States, the IFI General Assembly under Isabelo Jr. petitioned the House of Bishops of the Protestant Episcopal Church in the United States of America, one of the member churches of the Anglican Communion, to bestow the IFI with valid apostolic succession. Although a significant number of native Filipino Catholic priests had joined the IFI during its inception, there were no bishops who had joined the movement since the Catholic Church had consecrated no native Filipino bishops before and by the time the IFI broke away; therefore the church had lost the historic episcopate of apostolic succession. The Catholic Church started consecrating Filipinos in 1906, as enticement for the rest of the Filipino clergy not to affiliate with the movement. Before his death, first supreme bishop Gregorio Aglipay had previously sought bestowal of apostolic succession from other denominations abroad for years, but failed due to his Unitarian theological beliefs and past revolutionary activities. Historically, IFI bishops prior to the bestowal of apostolic succession were generally addressed and referenced only as "monsignors", with their "bishop" consecration and designation serving only as a title or position as high-ranking clergy whose roles were to head certain dioceses. The church justified its position that the priesthood was the essential holy order, while the episcopacy was merely a title of rank or administrative office.

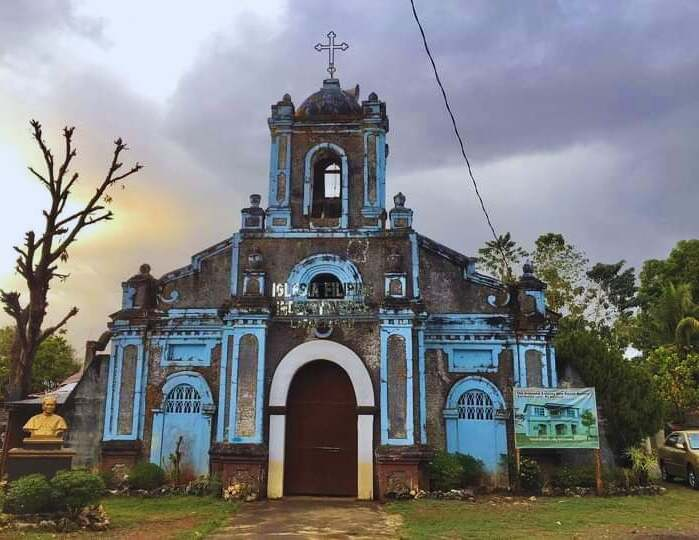
The church building of the Parish of Nuestra Señora de La Paz (Our Lady of Peace Parish) in La Paz, Abra was built by the Catholic Church sometime between 1898 and 1899, years before the IFI was proclaimed. The church's congregation, including its clergy, joined the IFI in 1903. The church building was one of the few buildings that the IFI was able to retain and not returned to the Catholic Church as the parishioners chose to remain with the IFI.

On August 5, 1947, the IFI Church officially adopted both a new Constitution and Canons and Declaration of Faith and Articles of Religion that were Trinitarian. According to the latter document, "the Doctrine and Constitutional Rules of the Philippine Independent Church, adopted on October 28, 1903, and subsequently amended, and the Fundamental Epistles of the Philippine Independent Church, are henceforth not to be held as binding either upon the clergy or laity of the church in matters of doctrine, discipline or order, wherein they differ in substance contained from the new Declaration of Faith or the Articles of Religion. They are, however, to be valued as historical documents promulgated by the founders of the church when they were seeking to interpret the Catholic faith in a manner understood by the people. Under the inspiration of the Holy Spirit, the church has sought to eradicate such errors of judgement and doctrine as crept into its life and official documents in times past".

The House of Bishops of the Episcopal Church in the United States of America then granted the IFI petition during their meeting in November 1947. On April 7, 1948, at the Episcopal Pro-Cathedral of Saint Luke in Manila, the Trinitarian IFI had its bishops, namely: de los Reyes Jr., Manuel Aguilar, and Gerardo Bayaca (third supreme bishop), reconsecrated and bestowed upon the historic apostolic succession from the Anglican line by the Episcopal Church in the United States of America led by then Missionary Bishop Norman S. Binsted, acting for the Presiding Bishop, and assisted by fellow Episcopal Church bishops Robert F. Wilner and Harry S. Kennedy, thus formally reaffirming Trinitarianism. Former President Emilio Aguinaldo acted as a sponsor for the three IFI bishops. The Trinitarian IFI then sued the Unitarian faction for sole rights to the name and property of the original IFI.

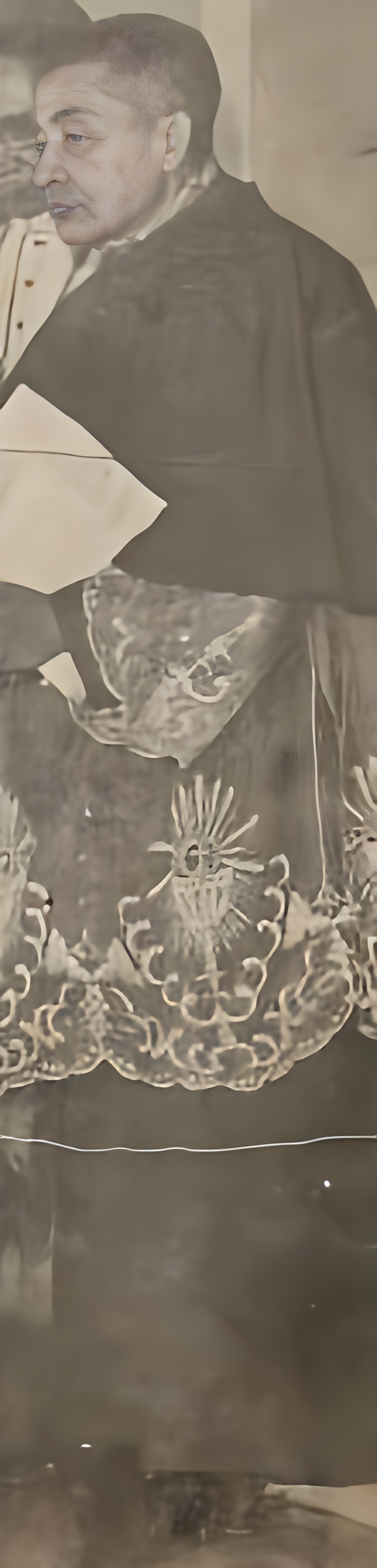
Isabelo de los Reyes Jr., the church's fourth supreme bishop from 1946 to 1971 and son of IFI founder and proclaimer Isabelo de los Reyes, is known by the moniker, the "Father of Ecumenism in the Philippines".

After prolonged litigation, in 1955, the more dominant Trinitarian faction was finally awarded by the Supreme Court the right to the name and possessions of the original IFI. The IFI then entered into full communion with the entire Anglican Communion in 1961 through the Episcopal Church in the United States of America. The Episcopal Church assisted in coming up with the IFI liturgical books with a Filipino missal. The missal shows a marked Anglican influence while retaining the form of the Catholic Mass. Consequently, the IFI officially published The Filipino Missal and The Filipino Ritual in 1961, replacing the Oficio Divino which was first published in 1906. The church later signed a concordat of full communion with the Church of England in October 1963, the Scottish Episcopal Church in December 1963, and the Old Catholic Union of Utrecht in 1965. Fonacier and Jamias's group, on the other hand, remained Unitarian, and eventually became known as the "Independent Church of Filipino Christians" (ICFC) which would later become a member of the International Association for Religious Freedom (IARF). However, they would soon fragment into other minor groups.

In the late 1960s, the church youth sector had begun criticizing the complacency of church leaders especially about making a clear stand regarding the semi-feudal and semi-colonial conditions of the Philippine society. As a result, Supreme Bishop de los Reyes Jr. recognized the youth's clamor to reclaim the church's nationalist heritage by allowing the organization of the first ever National Youth Assembly in 1969, marking the beginning of youth activism and reawakening of revolutionary nationalism, while still asserting their role to promote ecumenism.

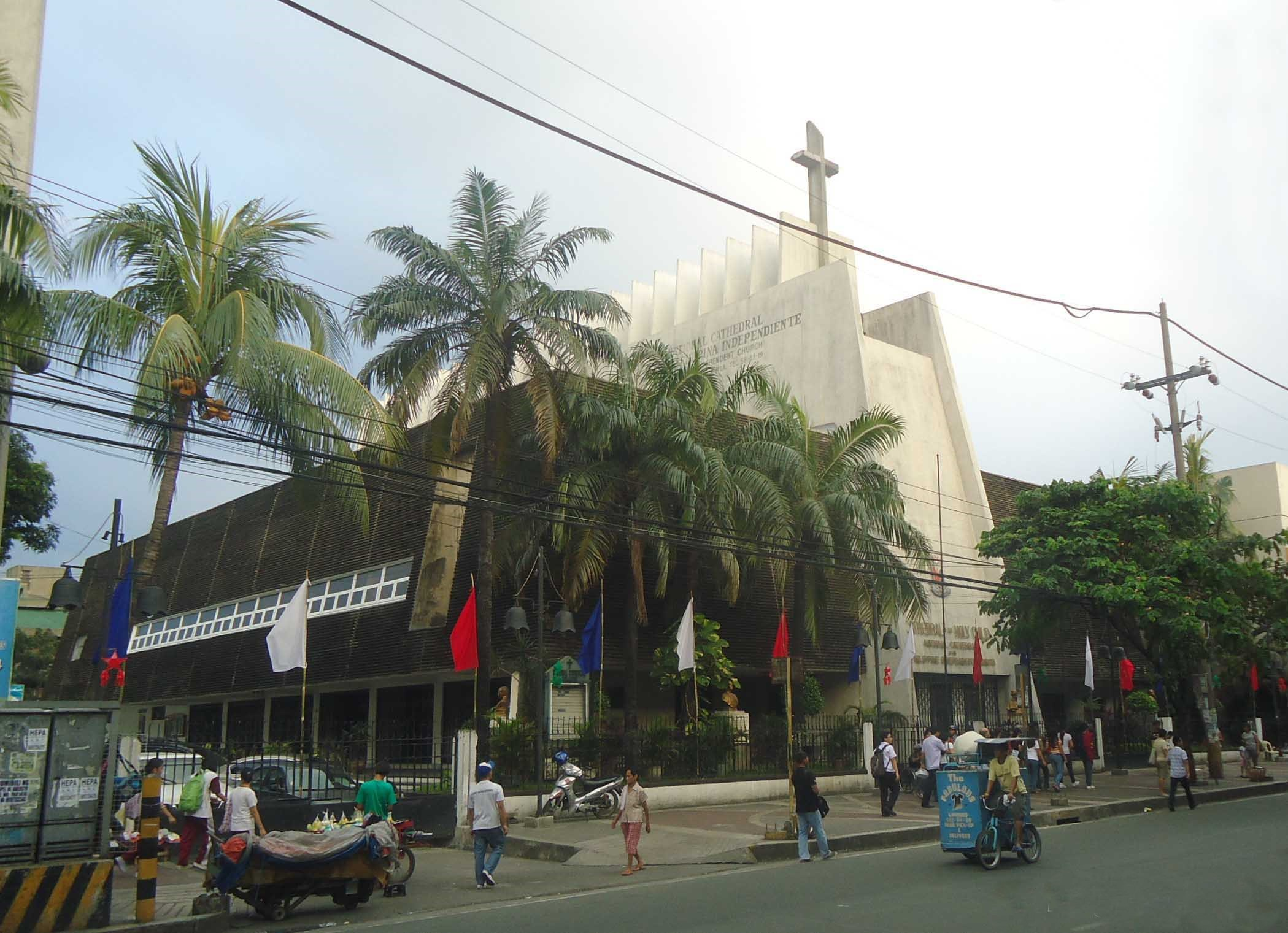
Exterior of the National Cathedral of the Holy Child located along Taft Avenue in Ermita, Manila.

On October 10, 1971, the 33rd death anniversary of Isabelo de los Reyes Sr., his son and then-supreme bishop Isabelo Jr. died of a heart attack, aged 71, while officiating a mass in the María Clara Christ Church in Santa Cruz, Manila. He was buried at the María Clara Christ Church on October 17 after having lain in state for one full week at the Iglesia Filipina Independiente National Cathedral which he had built in Taft Avenue, Manila. De los Reyes was succeeded in office by the church's then-general secretary, Macario V. Ga.

In 1973, the first reunification attempt between the IFI and ICFC was initiated during the administrations of Macario V. Ga (IFI's fifth supreme bishop) and Vicente K. Pasetes (ICFC's supreme bishop at that time). Although Santiago Fonacier, who served as ICFC consultant and bishop emeritus already at the time, was not physically part of the whole negotiation due to old age, he was represented by his son Anos J. Fonacier, a lawyer and entrepreneur. The said reunification attempt failed when the majority of the ICFC clergy, including Fonacier's legal counsel and son-in-law Rizalino R. Pablo, did not conform to the agreement of reconciliation due to their firm adherence to their Unitarian beliefs. In 1974, Pasetes finally reconciled with the IFI and brought with him four other ICFC bishops and a fair number of priests to the IFI fold which culminated in a memorandum of agreement that was signed between IFI's Ga and Pasetes himself. However, a segment of ICFC clergy refused to recognize the agreement. With the return of Pasetes to IFI, the remaining ICFC clergy elected a new ICFC supreme bishop in 1975.

In October 1977, the IFI Church adopted a new set of Constitution and Canons, as approved by the General Assembly held in May of the same year, wherein the supreme bishop shall only be elected for a term of six years without immediate re-election starting in 1981. Then in 1981, a faction of the church called the "Iglesia Catolica Filipina Independiente" or the "Philippine Independent Catholic Church" (ICFI/PICC) was formed — led by then-supreme bishop Macario V. Ga (who was on his 9th year in office) and priest Armando L. de la Cruz, whose faction claimed to have maintained the "original catholic ethos and doctrine of the original nationalist independent church".

Ga was a known staunch supporter of former president and dictator Ferdinand Marcos which caused tension to a number of bishops and laity who were critical of Marcos and his dictatorship, thus marking the rekindling of the aforementioned clergymen's revolutionary nationalist roots. The opposing faction of clergy and laity rallied the election of Abdias R. de la Cruz, then the Bishop of Aklan and Capiz and concurrent general secretary, as the new supreme bishop in the 1981 General Assembly. Ga, refusing to step down, then filed a petition at the Securities and Exchange Commission (SEC) in an attempt to nullify the election of de la Cruz. Ga also questioned the authenticity of the adopted 1977 Constitution and Canons, albeit a few years past from its approval. However, even after a motion for reconsideration, both the SEC and the Court of Appeals executed the decision in favor of de la Cruz and the 1977 Constitution and Canons in 1985 and 1987, respectively.

Ga's faction subsequently got their name registered separately in the SEC. The IFI later responded by asking a Manila Court to prevent the faction from using the name "Iglesia Catolica Filipina Independiente", an exact same name in one of the former's SEC-registered legally recognized alternative names. The SEC reviewed and later revoked the certificate of incorporation of the ICFI and ordered to change its name to avoid confusion with the IFI and all of its dioceses, who had registered the "Iglesia Catolica Filipina Independiente" name first, years before Ga's faction, therefore deemed the rightful owner of the name.

The ICFI/PICC subsequently continued as a separate organization and appealed the case to the Supreme Court. Eventually, pursuant to a compromise agreement, the ICFI/PICC and its chapters/dioceses registered under a different name in 2014, with only a slight modification and variation from the previous names. Their Visayas archdiocese also correspondingly changed its diocesan name to "Eastern Visayas Independent Catholic Church" (EVICC), headed by their metropolitan archbishop Valiant O. Dayagbil, a former IFI priest himself. The Supreme Court later discussed the historical division involving Ga's faction and the subsequent organization of the "Iglesia Catolica Filipina Independiente" (ICFI) or Philippine Independent Catholic Church (PICC) in the case Philippine Independent Church v. Bishop Martin Basañes, G.R. No. 220220, August 15, 2018. Ultimately, in 2019, the entire group became formally known as the "International Conference of Philippine Independent Catholic Churches of Jesus Christ", which has been in concordat with the Anglican Church in North America (ACNA), a non-member province of the Anglican Communion, since 2020.

In the latter half of the 1990s, Ga voluntarily reconciled with the IFI, which led to the signing of a memorandum of agreement that paved the way for the mass return of a fair number of congregation and clergy in the Ilocos Norte and Cotabato areas. However, Armando de la Cruz, who was already the ICFI/PICC's duly elected supreme metropolitan archbishop, was adamant on the reunification. Unlike the IFI wherein the Supreme Bishop is only allowed to have a non-consecutive six-year term, Armando de la Cruz of the ICFI/PICC has a lifetime term as supreme metropolitan archbishop. Ga's return to the IFI resulted in another breakaway group from the ICFI/PICC that was established in 1995 under the name "Aglipayan Christian Church Inc. (Legion of Mary)", which is based in Davao City.

In 1995, the concordat of full communion between the IFI and the Church of Sweden was signed. On February 17, 1997, the IFI also signed a concordat of full communion with the then newly-autonomous Episcopal Church in the Philippines (ECP).

=== Present day activities ===
IFI congregations are also found throughout the Philippine diaspora in North America, Europe, the Middle East, and parts of Asia and the Pacific Islands. The World Council of Churches and the church itself recorded to have a number of roughly 6 to 7 million adherents. According to some sources, the church is the second-largest single Trinitarian Christian denomination in the Philippines, after the Catholic Church (some 80.2% of the population), comprising about 6.7% of the total population of the Philippines. By contrast, the 2010, 2015, and 2020 Philippine Census recorded only 916,639; 756,225; and 1,458,992 members in the country, respectively, or about 1% of the population. Winning large numbers of adherents in its early years because of its nationalist roots, Aglipayan numbers gradually dwindled through the years due to factionalism and doctrinal disagreements. At present, there are at least 30 splinter groups and more — who broke away from and not in communion with the IFI (mainstream Aglipayan) — still bearing and carrying the "Aglipayan" name and tradition.

Unlike the Catholic Church and several other Christian denominations, the church does not discourage its members from joining Freemasonry. Some of the members of the church, like the founders de los Reyes and Aglipay, are political activists, often involved in progressive groups and advocating nationalism, anti-imperialism, social justice, democracy, labor rights, as well as opposing extrajudicial killings. They have often been victims of enforced disappearances and been branded as leftists by the government for being aligned with progressive groups, specifically after Alberto Ramento, the ninth supreme bishop, was killed in 2006 for being an anti-government critic.

The church then created the "Ramento Project for Rights Defenders" (RPRD), the IFI's human rights advocacy and service arm for South–Central Luzon, in Ramento's honor. The church also has another development institution called the "Visayas-Mindanao Regional Office for Development" (VIMROD). As per the 1947 Declaration of Faith and Articles of Religion (DFAR), the church itself claims to be "not an ally with any particular school of political thought or with any political party, asserting that its members are politically free". Contrary to popular belief, the rule on the separation of church and state in the Philippines does not necessarily mean that the IFI Church is prohibited in human rights advocacies. The church has also managed to build schools from pre-school to college, notably the Episcopal–IFI jointly funded Trinity University of Asia, and cemeteries in some areas of the country managed by its respective dioceses.

While people outside the IFI Church collectively refer to the members as "Aglipayans", members of the church themselves recently prefer to collectively refer to themselves as "Filipinistas", "Pilipinhons", "IFIans", and "Independientes". They would sometimes brand themselves as the "Native Filipino Catholic Church" to distinguish themselves from adherents of the "Roman" Catholic Church. The members prefer to refer every August 3 of the year as their "proclamation anniversary" of independence from Rome rather than founding anniversary as they claim to continue adhering to the concept of catholicity, indicating continuity of faith and practice from Early Christianity, despite separating from the authority of the See of Rome. They also refer to Isabelo de los Reyes as "proclaimer" and Gregorio Aglipay as the "first supreme bishop", rather than founders.

== Doctrine and practice ==
=== Worship and liturgy ===
The main Sunday liturgy is the Eucharist or the Holy Mass, which is spoken and celebrated in the vernacular. The Eucharistic liturgy of the Iglesia Filipina Independiente resembles that of the Roman Missal, with elements taken from the Anglican Book of Common Prayer, such as the Collect for Purity, the positioning of the Sign of Peace before the Offertory, the Eucharistic Prayers, and the Prayer of Humble Access. Just like the Catholic Church, the IFI Church does the sign of the cross in left to right motion. The church professes both the Apostles' Creed and Nicene Creed, but uses the latter most of the time. The church also believes and administers the seven sacraments. The IFI Church declares that the Four Marks of the Church ("one, holy, catholic, and apostolic") is present within their church, thus claiming to be an independent jurisdiction of the one, holy, catholic, and apostolic Church. Orders of service and ceremonies are contained in The Filipino Ritual and The Filipino Missal. Although not officially accepted by the church's biblical canon, the seven deuterocanonical books are regarded by the IFI as "worthy of veneration and source of wisdom". The church does not adhere to sola scriptura. The church generally affirms the authority of both Scripture and Tradition and believes that faith and reason are equal. Clergy celebrants are assisted by young male and female altar servers (locally referred as "sacristan") and acolytes. The church does not have a prescribed dress code for mass attendees but encourages everyone to dress appropriately. The church also does not hold a moral prohibition on clergy members wearing piercings and tattoos. The church follows the yearly IFI Liturgical Ordo Calendar wherein the liturgical seasons, observances, and traditions closely resemble to that of the Catholic Church.

Aglipayans strongly adhere to the Real Presence of Christ in the Eucharist, and communion is distributed under both kinds through intinction. However, they remain non-committal on whether the Real Presence is best understood in terms of transubstantiation, consubstantiation, or sacramental union. Aglipayans maintain that the belief in the Real Presence does not imply a claim to know how Jesus Christ is present in the Eucharistic species (the consecrated bread and wine) and that this is left to mystery. Moreover, belief in the Real Presence does not imply that the consecrated Eucharistic species cease to be bread and wine. Church members are also taught that the Eucharistic species do not necessarily change into the actual body and blood of Christ only at the moment of consecration; rather, Christ's body and blood become really present and are really given throughout the entire Eucharistic liturgy. Furthermore, Aglipayans believe that one receives the body and blood of Christ by faith, asserting instead that Christ is present in the Eucharist in a "heavenly and spiritual manner". Nonetheless, Aglipayans have never formally questioned the theological doctrines of transubstantiation, consubstantiation, and sacramental union.

The IFI Church incorporates a strong nationalist element. Being a nationalist church, Aglipayans employ Filipino national symbols in their liturgical practices, such as the use of national colors and motifs, the singing of the national anthem, and the displaying of the national flag in the sanctuary since 1907. During the American occupation, the Flag Law of 1907 or Act No.1696 — an act to prohibit the display of flags, banners, emblems, or devices used in the Philippine islands for the purpose of rebellion or insurrection against the authorities of the United States and the display of Katipunan flags, banners, emblems, or devices and for other purposes — was passed on September 6, 1907, by the Philippine Commission. At the time, the United States flag used to be the official flag of the Philippines until October 1919 when the law was repealed by the Philippine Legislature. By the time that the Flag Act was enacted, as an act of protest, the IFI clergy led by Gregorio Aglipay designed their clerical vestments with images and colors of the Philippine Flag and used it during their mass celebrations. Subsequently, the clerical vestment designs inspired by the Philippine Flag colors and symbols are still practiced up to this day by the IFI in honor to its nationalist and revolutionary heritage. At present, since the implementation of the Republic Act No. 8491 or the Flag and Heraldic Code of the Philippines in 1998, there has been no recorded or documented reports of violations made by the IFI in the Section 34 of the aforementioned law.

Although not widely known, Aglipayans are also adherents to praying the rosary, but do not celebrate October as the Month of the Rosary. October is instead celebrated by the church as the Month of the Laity. Aglipayans also practice house church. The church does not hold as dogmas the Immaculate Conception (the church rather celebrates its feast simply as the "Feast Day of the Conception of the Blessed Virgin Mary"), the Assumption (August 15 is instead celebrated as the Feast Day of the Solemnity of the Blessed Virgin Mary), or the Perpetual virginity of Mary (maintaining that Jesus had siblings from Mary and Joseph); but these may be believed by the faithfuls privately. The IFI practices infant baptism. The IFI's tradition of celebration surrounding First Communion varies from the Catholic Church. Whereas the Catholic Church hold a special ceremony when the child receives their first communion, the IFI commonly allows infant first communion in a regular mass depending on the parents' discretion and the infant's physiological tolerance coupled with introductory/early basic catechism from the parents or the Church before receiving such. Nevertheless, the Church is also tolerant when one conventionally receives their first communion at the age of 7 or 8, which is generally considered the age of reason, preferably after a session/s of necessary "religious instructions" or catechism. All communicants are required to have undergone baptism administered through the Trinitarian formula first and be regular church goers before receiving their first communion. The Sacrament of Confirmation on the other hand can only be administered by bishops to baptized individuals starting from the age of 12 which is considered the "age of Christian maturity". Contrary to popular belief, the IFI also administers the Sacrament of Penance, although auricular confession (Note: Auricular Confession is the confession of sin "into the ear" of the priest, which is part of penance.) is rarely practiced since not all priests can administer it – only those who are authorized by their bishops the faculties to hear confession. Albeit not required, Aglipayans, at their discretion, may confess their sins individually only through an authorized priest at the altar rail, in a reconciliation room within the church, or in sight of others waiting in the row for the same purpose (but at some distance to not break the seal of confession), instead of a confessional box. By practice, Aglipayans usually join general/public confession "directly to God" during the Eucharist or Holy Mass. Aglipayans also repudiate the traditional concept of purgatory. The purgatory as a physical place that the IFI believes in is on Earth. The IFI also has their own process of exorcism, but is not considered a sacrament and has no specific prescribed formula, nor an "office of exorcist". Unlike the Catholic Church, wherein a priest has to undergo specialized training and authority, all ordained IFI priests with "strong spiritual discernment" can perform exorcism, as long as they consulted their respective diocesan bishops and after a careful medical examination to exclude the possibility of mental illness, and should only be done as a last resort. Although not mandatorily coercive, the church also highly encourages its members to practice tithing as the minimum standard form of "Christian giving back". The church does not prescribe a standard amount during the collection of alms (offerings) in the Holy Mass.

The IFI Church places a strong emphasis on the participation of the laity in worship, liturgy, and policy-making. Laypeople are often involved in leading prayers, reading scripture, and serving as Eucharistic ministers.

The Iglesia Filipina Independiente views their history of liberation from the Catholic Church during the colonial era in the Philippines as comparable to that of the story of Exodus which can be found in the religious book of the same name in the Bible.

=== Apostolic succession ===
The Iglesia Filipina Independiente (IFI) rejects the exclusive right to valid apostolic succession by the Petrine Papacy. The IFI believes that apostolic succession emphasizes the collective authority of all the apostles, not just Peter. Therefore, the IFI strongly suggests that the succession of authority in the Early Church did not derive solely from Peter but from all the apostles.

Bishops of the IFI derive their unbroken line of apostolic succession from the Episcopal Church in the United States of America (TEC) of the Anglican line, which was first bestowed upon them on April 7, 1948. The Anglican line traces its succession from the Archbishop of Canterbury. Moreover, the Old Catholic Churches recognizes the validity of Anglican orders through the 1931 Bonn Agreement wherein a full communion was established between the Old Catholic Churches and to all churches of the Anglican Communion to which TEC is a member of. Additionally, some Eastern Orthodox churches also affirms the validity of Anglican orders.

The Old Catholic Church subsequently began co-consecrating bishops of the Iglesia Filipina Independiente after a full communion was established between the two churches on their own right on September 21, 1965, therefore, the IFI also traces their succession from the Old Catholic lineage. According to the principle of ex opere operato, certain ordinations of and by Old Catholic bishops are still recognised as being valid and has never been formally questioned by the Holy See.

=== Priesthood and ministry ===
The Iglesia Filipina Independiente maintains the historic threefold ministry of bishops, priests, and deacons. The aforementioned three orders of ministers have distinct vestments from one another. Their vestment varies according to the liturgy being celebrated.

Clerical celibacy is optional. It allows its priests to marry, rejecting mandatory clerical celibacy while committing to marital chastity. Priests may also remain unmarried.

Priests are also sometimes referred to as presbyters. An aspiring priest is required to complete a bachelor's degree in Theology from one of the church's officially organized seminaries.

The Iglesia Filipina Independiente has two classification of deacons — the Transitional Deacon (one who is waiting to be ordained for priesthood), and the Permanent (Perpetual) or Vocational Deacon (one who has specialized ministry and not necessarily be ordained to priesthood).

Priests and deacons (except for Permanent/Vocational Deacons) are not allowed to accept salaries from employment or appointment in an office outside the church without the written permission of their diocesan bishops. Bishops as well are not allowed to do such endeavors without the written permission of the Executive Commission. Spouses of the aforementioned clergy are not subject to such policy and are given liberty to earn income on their own. The vow of poverty is not stated in the Constitution and Canons, although priests are strictly mandated to always put their ministry on top priority wherein it should not be compromised when permitted to have an occupation outside the church.

Albeit controversial, the Iglesia Filipina Independiente also allows the ordination of women. In February 1997, Rosalina V. Rabaria of the Diocese of Aklan and Capiz became the first woman to be officially ordained priest in the Iglesia Filipina Independiente. On May 5, 2019, Emelyn Dacuycuy of the Diocese of Batac became the first woman to be consecrated bishop in the Iglesia Filipina Independiente, further asserting their belief in women's inclusion and breaking the tradition of patriarchy in the clergy. The date and venue of Dacuycuy's consecration coincided with Gregorio Aglipay's date and place of birth. The church as a whole also refers to itself using female pronouns.

Unlike the Catholic Church and most Anglican churches, the Iglesia Filipina Independiente currently does not have nuns or religious sisters. Some members of the Women of the Philippine Independent Church (WOPIC) in certain dioceses wear veils and religious habits similar to that of the religious sisters, during mass, as a "sign of reverence". During Lenten season, a group of WOPIC members in certain dioceses called nobisyas (literally translated to novice in English) render 40-day church services as their pamamanata (act of penance) and wear veil as "an honorable way to imitate Mary, mother of Jesus", same thing with the seven women "dolorosas". The IFI used to have nuns when the Episcopal Sisters of St. Anne in Mindanao and the Episcopal Sisters of Mary the Virgin in Luzon accepted IFI women into their religious orders for sisterhood training in the 1960s. The IFI sisters later established their own order: the Sisters of the Holy Child Jesus in the 1970s, having their base at the Episcopalian St. Andrew's Theological Seminary, and unlike its priests wherein clerical celibacy is optional, the IFI nuns adhere to the vow of chastity in celibacy; as well as the other traditional vows of poverty and obedience. However, due to insufficient institutional patronage, the congregation eventually disbanded, with some of them joining back to the Episcopalian sisters in Luzon.

The Iglesia Filipina Independiente has priests who are military chaplains of the Philippine Army Chaplain Service, and has also launched a ministry for seafarers and their families, the Mission to Seafarers PH.

A clergy member cannot be in political office or be involved in political election while continuing ministry as ordained. The clergy member must seek the approval of his/her bishop at least two months before the filing of candidacy. A clergy member upon applying his/her certificate of candidacy is considered resigned. An ordained who had joined an electoral contest, being an official candidate and lost, may be admitted again to the ministry and apply for a reinstatement to the Supreme Council of Bishops (subject for approval) as long as he/she completes a one-year refresher course in one of the IFI's seminaries. On the other hand, an ordained who won an election may also be admitted again to the ministry and apply for a reinstatement to the Supreme Council of Bishops, after he/she officially ends his/her political tenure and must not concurrently hold a government position, as long as he/she also completes a one-year refresher course.

A male priest of the regular clergy is commonly addressed with the honorific title "The Reverend Father" (contracted to The Rev./Rev'd. Fr.) while a woman priest is addressed simply with "The Reverend" (contracted to "Rev" or "Reb" or "Padi" in spoken and reference style). Deacons, regardless of sex and gender, are addressed as "The Reverend Deacon" (contracted to The Rev./Rev'd. Dcn.).

Minor orders in the church include subdeacons (mostly higher-year seminarians) and acolytes. Furthermore, the church has non-ordained commissioned lectors (commentators), and lay readers/lay ministers/or lay preachers in every diocese.

=== Saints ===
In the most general sense, all of the church's faithful deceased in "Heaven" are considered to be saints, but some are considered worthy of greater honor or emulation.

Just like the Catholic Church, IFI members are Marian devotees and devotees of saints, especially Biblical (New Testament) saints and Catholic saints. Although the IFI Church do not officially claim to be a "Marian-centric church", Mary, mother of Jesus is honored by the Church to be the most prominent among the saints being the theotokos. Nevertheless, several Catholic saints canonized by Rome after the 1902 schism are not recognized by the Church and its members. Meanwhile, Popes (or Bishops of Rome) universally canonized as saints before the 1902 schism are still widely acknowledged by the IFI Church. The IFI Church also celebrates All Saints' Day and All Souls' Day every November 1 and 2, respectively. While veneration of saints is formally practiced, deification of saints on the other hand is condemned by the Church as blasphemy.

In the liturgical calendar of the IFI, the Monday after All Saints' Day is designated as "Commemoration Day for the Martyrs and Confessors of the IFI".

During the early days of the schism particularly in September 1903, the church, led by Aglipay together with a number of bishops, canonized José Rizal and the Gomburza priests in a closed-door conference. However, the church has since revoked their sainthood in the 1950s and already ceased to recognize them as saints up to this day since it was "done during the nationalistic phase of the church", although they still recognize them as foremost national heroes and early IFI martyrs.

=== Contraception ===
Aglipayan bishops joined public demonstrations in support of the Reproductive Health Bill, a legislation advocating for contraception and sex education to reduce the rate of abortion and control rapid population growth that the Catholic Church and several other Christian denominations objected to on moral grounds.

=== Stance on abortion ===
Although supportive of the Reproductive Health Bill, the Iglesia Filipina Independiente strongly opposes non-"medically necessary" induced abortion.

=== LGBTQ rights ===
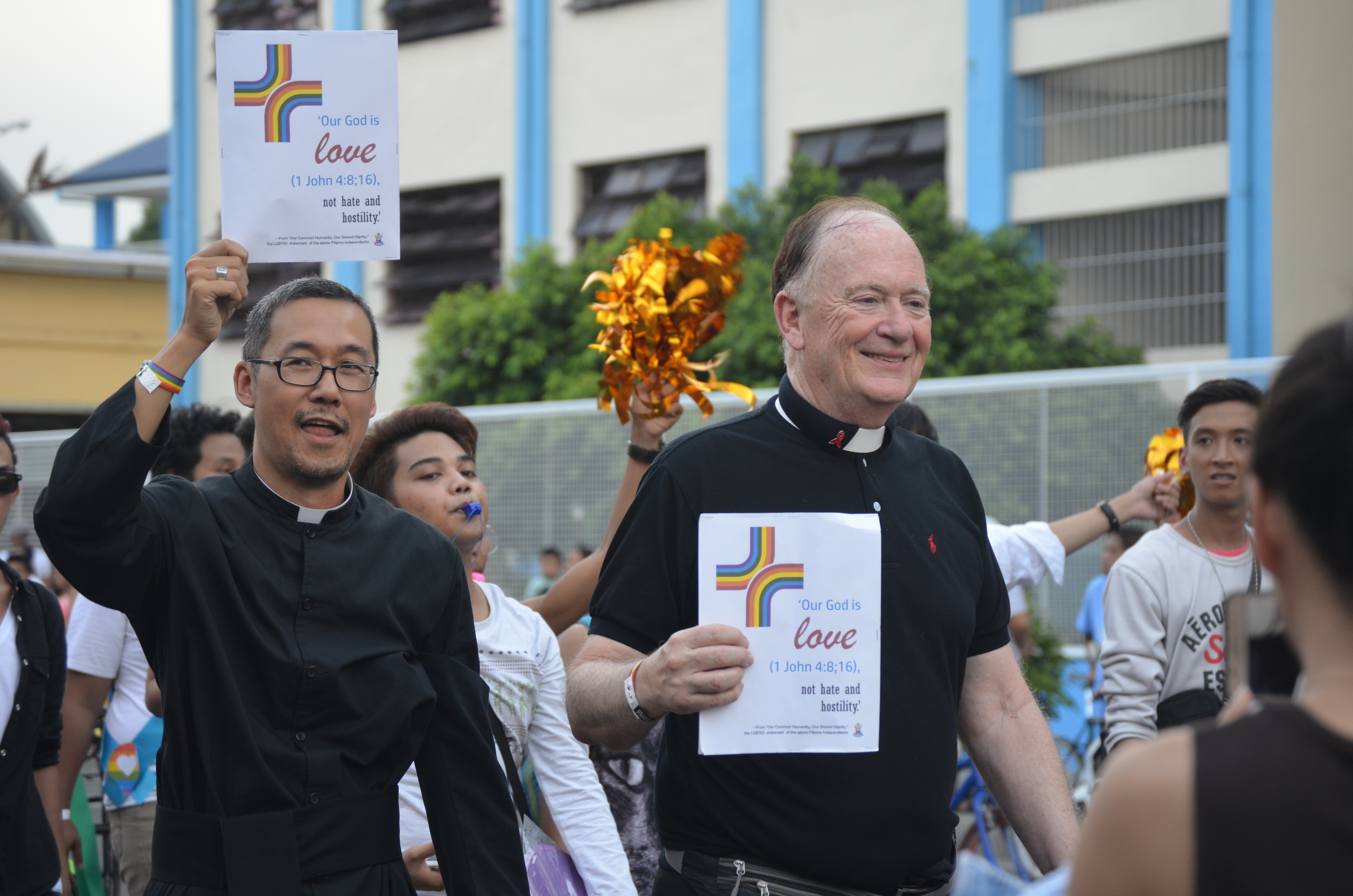
Members of the Philippine Independent Church and Episcopal Church in the Philippines participating in the 2017 Pride March in Marikina City, Philippines.

In 2017, the church's position on the LGBTQ+ community changed to an extent wherein the church leadership acknowledged, apologized, and released a statement in which it states, among other things, that the IFI has, for many times, "shown indifference, and have made the LGBTQ+ people feel less human, discriminated against, and stigmatized." The statement – dubbed "Our Common Humanity, Our Shared Dignity" – stresses the church's position that it "must openly embrace God's people of all sexes, sexual orientations, gender identities, and expressions (SSOGIE)." Moreover, although the church is still opposed to the holy matrimony of same-sex couples, the statement stresses that the IFI is "offering their Church as a community where LGBTIQ+ people can freely and responsibly express themselves, pronouncing God's all-inclusive love."

This apology statement's groundwork first came up in 2014, when a gay member articulated during the church plenary his query about the church's plans for sexual minorities. This led to discussions among the newly-elected set of national youth officers, led by an openly gay president and a lesbian executive vice-president, which would later be succeeded by another openly gay president. The church's position on LGBTQ+ persons was approved by the Supreme Council of Bishops and officially adopted by the entire church in February 2017. The church has now fully committed to accepting LGBTQ+ people as part of their congregation, and their ministry.

On February 24, 2023, the church ordained Wylard "Wowa" Ledama, a trans woman and registered nurse-turned-seminarian, to the diaconate as the church's and country's first ordained trans clergy. She was assigned at the National Cathedral. This move by the church was met with mixed reactions from other denominations.

=== Views on divorce ===
Although no official statement yet from the Church as a whole, a number of church officials, especially those from Mindanao, expressed openness to the passage of the Divorce Bill in the Philippines. However, they clarified that it should not be misconstrued as a disregard to the "sanctity of marriage", but as a matter of practicality. They further stated that while they believe that couples are duty-bound to keep their marriage vows, divorce may be used as a last resort, when psychological and incompatibility problems make it difficult for both partners to live together.

According to the officials, the IFI's stance on the controversial subject stems from its teachings that emphasize the "people's rights for freedom, dignity, and integrity, which also means encouraging the society to be responsive to the realities of time and to recognize that there have been unions that were wrong". They further clarified that the church will still "guide" couples on not resorting to divorce, if possible.

=== Response to red-tagging ===
Several church officials are advocates against the culture of impunity and as a result, a number of them have received accusations by government personnel tagging them as alleged enablers and sympathizers of insurgents and terrorists ("red-tagging"). The church released a statement strongly condemning such allegations. A number of church officials also urged Congress to probe the red-tagging incidents and conduct an impartial investigation.

== Organization ==
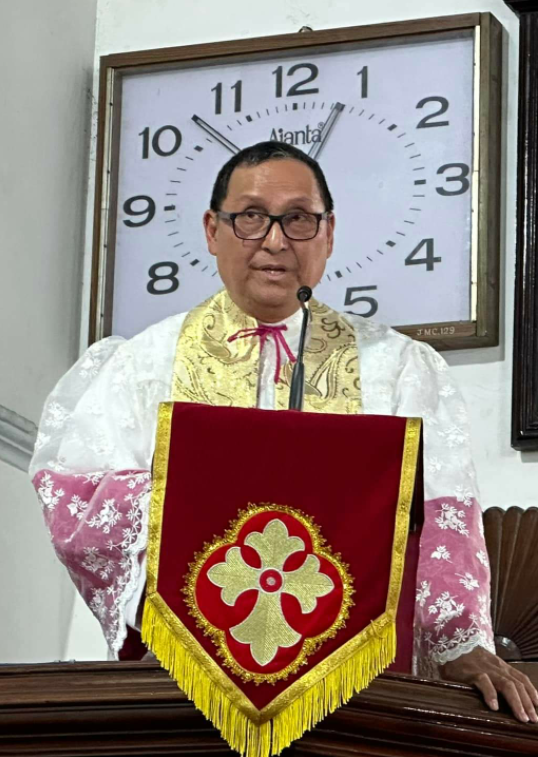
Joel Porlares, the incumbent Supreme Bishop since 2023

The Iglesia Filipina Independiente is an episcopally-led, synodically-governed church. The General Assembly is the highest policy-making body while the Executive Commission is the highest policy-making body in the absence of the General Assembly. The church leadership is autocephalous and is led by the Supreme Bishop, similar to a presiding bishop in other denominations. The Supreme Bishop heads the Executive Commission. The 14th and current Supreme Bishop is Joel Porlares, who was elected on May 9, 2023.

The church has three predominant clergy and laity councils: the Supreme Council of Bishops (SCB), the Council of Priests (COP), and the National Lay Council (NCL).

There are three mandated major sectoral organizations of the laity (lay organizations) in the church under the National Lay Council: the Youth of the Iglesia Filipina Independiente (YIFI), the Women of the Philippine Independent Church (WOPIC), and the Laymen of the Iglesia Filipina Independiente (LIFI).

Meanwhile, the priests also have their own special sectoral organization: the National Priests Organization (NPO). Other special sectoral organizations in the church include, the Clergy Spouses Organization (CSO), and the nonsanctioned Clergy Children Organization (CCO). Just like the Catholic Church, the IFI also have pious associations.

The Philippine Independent Church is primarily organized into dioceses which are considered as the "local churches". In every diocese, there is a cathedral containing the cathedra of a bishop. A diocese is composed of parishes and missions. A parish and mission may have outstations. Parishes and missions in every diocese are geographically grouped into vicariates.

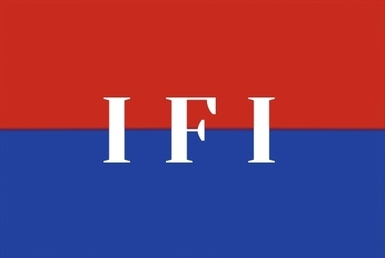
The official flag of the Iglesia Filipina Independiente

The official flag of the church is a horizontal bicolor flag with equal bands of royal blue and crimson red, with the initials IFI in color white text inscribed at the center. The red color of the flag shall be at the right side, while the color blue shall be on the left side, thus, when the flag is hoist in a pole, the red color shall be in the upper part, which symbolizes its revolutionary heritage and paying homage to its historical revolutionary nationalist roots, hence debunking claims and accusations of inciting insurgency.

=== Names ===
Iglesia Filipina Independiente is the official and full legal name of the Philippine Independent Church, while the latter is its English translation as specified in the church's Constitution and Canons. The early members used Spanish for the church's official name since Spanish was the sole official language of the Philippines throughout its more than three centuries of Spanish rule, from the late 16th century to 1898, and then a co-official language (with English) under its American rule.

Aside from the previously disputed Iglesia Catolica Filipina Independiente, or Philippine Independent Catholic Church in its English translation, other legally recognized names in which the denomination may alternatively be known are: Iglesia Catolica Apostolica Filipina Independiente or Philippine Independent Catholic Apostolic Church, Iglesia Aglipayana or Aglipayan Church, Iglesia Catolica Aglipayana or Aglipayan Catholic Church, and Iglesia Independiente Aglipayana or Aglipayan Independent Church.

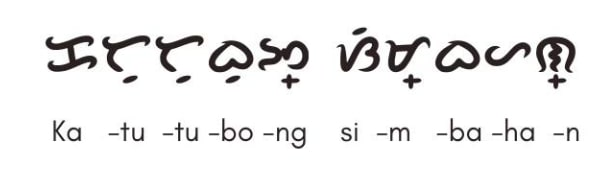
Iglesia Filipina Independiente written in Baybayin (transliterated from the words "Katutubong Simbahan" or "Indigenous Church")

All aforementioned names are duly registered in the Securities and Exchange Commission with SEC Registration No. PW-611, as a religious corporation sole, originally incorporated in 1904 at the Department of Commerce during the Insular Government of the Philippine Islands period and got registered at the SEC in 1936, which was the same year when the SEC was created. The names Iglesia Filipina Independiente, Philippine Independent Church, and Aglipayan Church are much more commonly used.

== Notable churches ==
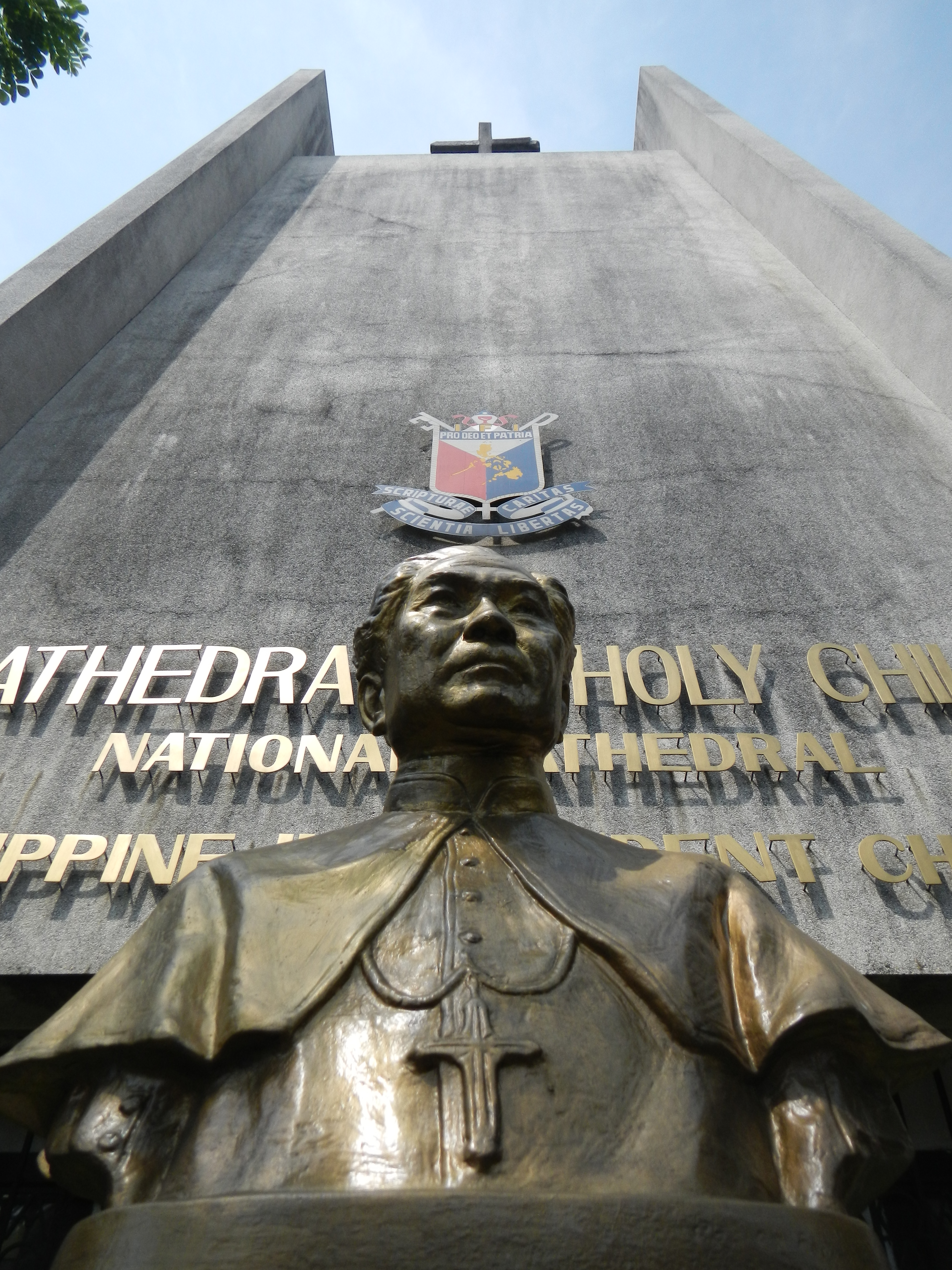
A bust of Gregorio Aglipay displayed at the front of the National Cathedral.

Owing to its roots in the Catholic tradition, the structure of the church buildings, as well as the outstation chapels, of the Philippine Independent Church do not differ significantly from Catholic church buildings in the Philippines.

=== Cathedral of the Holy Child (National Cathedral) ===
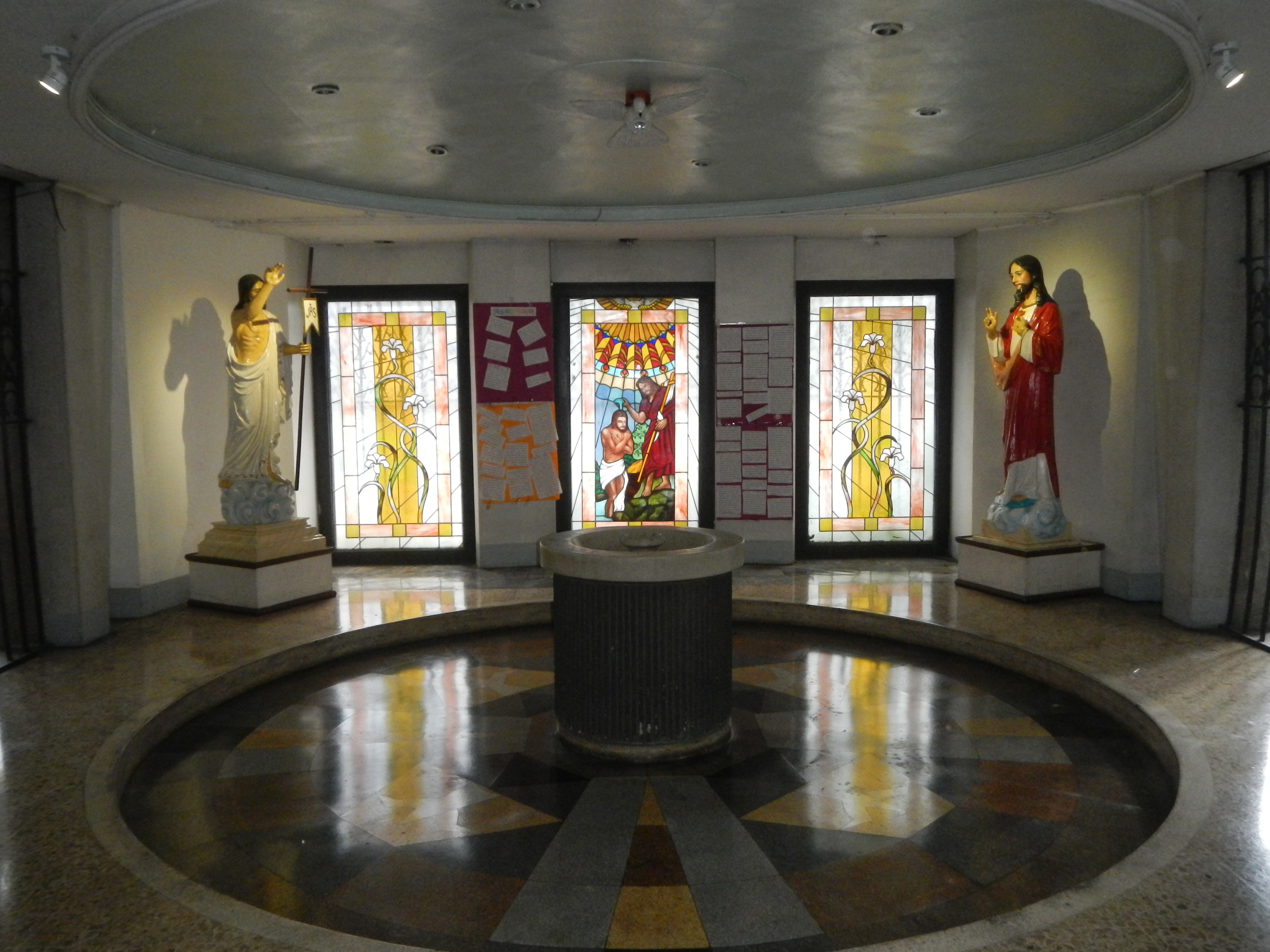
The baptistery at the Cathedral of the Holy Child (National Cathedral)

Located along Taft Avenue, the Cathedral of the Holy Child in Ermita, Manila, is the National Cathedral of the Iglesia Filipina Independiente and the seat of the supreme bishop. Designed by architect Carlos Arguelles, construction of the church began in 1964 and was inaugurated on May 8, 1969, to commemorate the 109th birth anniversary of its first supreme bishop, Gregorio Aglipay. The church is made largely of bare concrete and wood and has been noted for having a suspended block with sloping trapezoidal walls and textured with horizontal grooves all throughout, suspended with a triangular block.

=== María Clara Parish Church ===
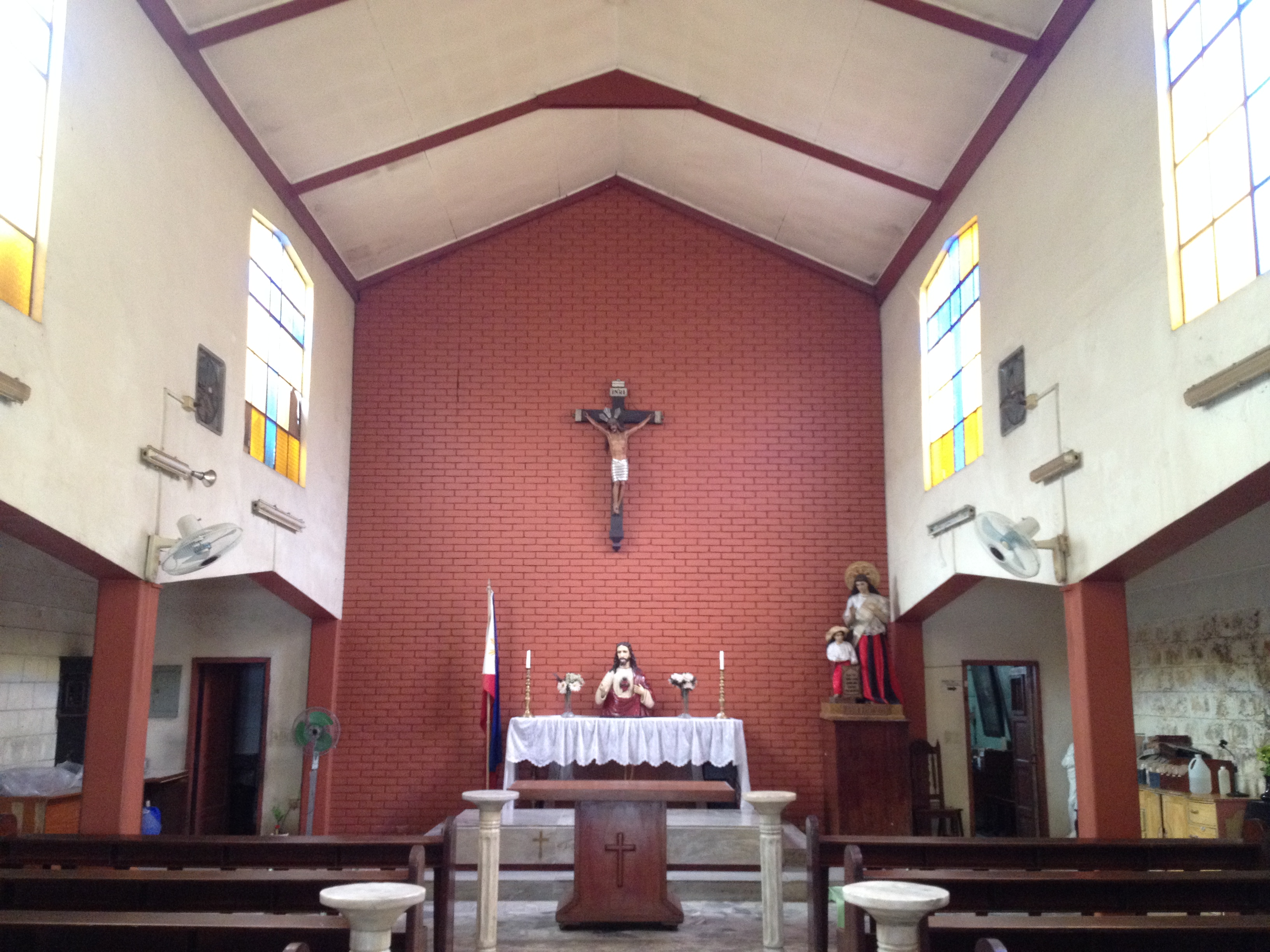
Interior of the María Clara Parish Church

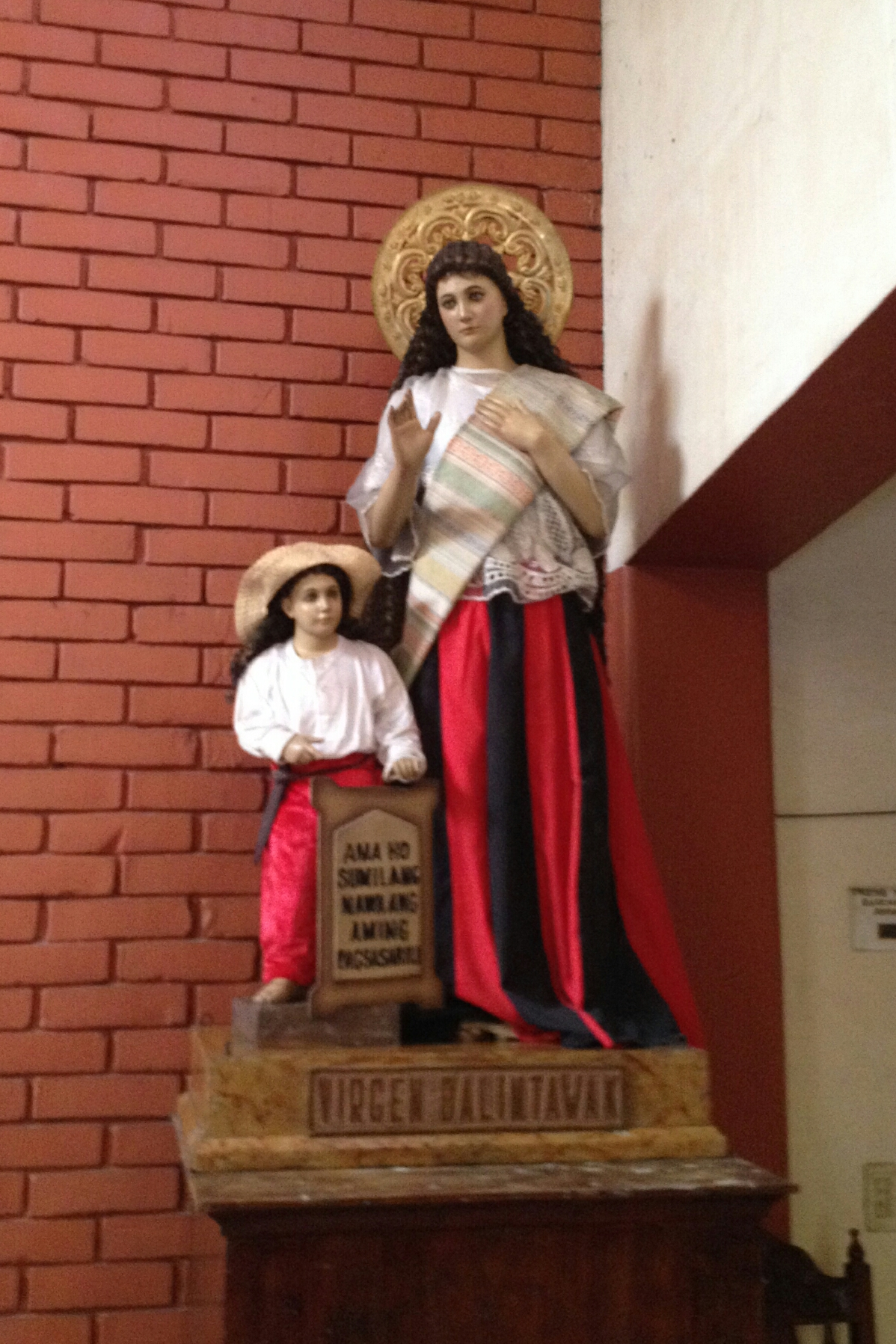
The original statue of the Our Lady of Balintawak located in María Clara Parish Church.

Named after the main heroine in Rizal's Noli Me Tángere, the María Clara Parish Church (formerly the María Clara Christ Church) in Santa Cruz, Manila, was originally built as a wooden structure in 1923 before it was expanded and rebuilt as a concrete structure in the 1950s. When the original national cathedral of the Iglesia Filipina Independiente in Tondo was destroyed during World War II, the María Clara Parish Church became the temporary office of the supreme bishop before relocating in 1969 to the present-day Cathedral of the Holy Child. The original statue of the Virgin of Balintawak is housed in the María Clara Parish Church. While the administration of the parish is under the Diocese of Greater Manila Area, the physical property and church building itself is owned by the de los Reyes family. The current resident and parish bishop of the church is semi-retired bishop Gregorio de los Reyes, son of Isabelo Jr. and grandson of Isabelo Sr.

== Seminaries ==
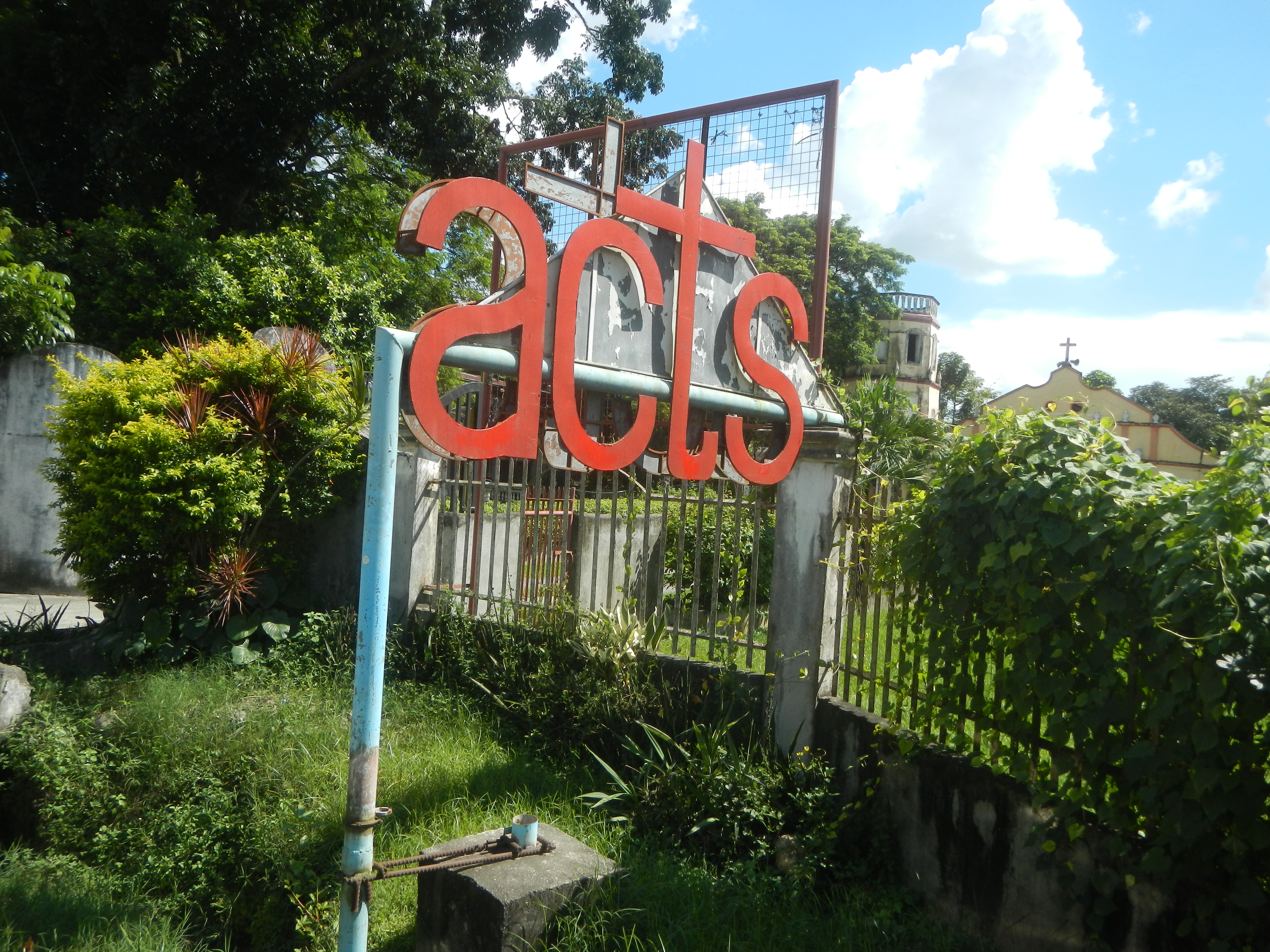
Aglipay Central Theological Seminary (ACTS)

The Aglipay Central Theological Seminary (ACTS) in Urdaneta City, Pangasinan is the regional seminary of the church serving the North-Central and South-Central Luzon Dioceses. ACTS offers Bachelor of Theology and Divinity programs for members who aspire to enter the ordained ministry. These are four-year study programs with curriculum focusing on biblical, theological, historical, and pastoral studies, with reference to parish management and development, and cultural and social context.

The St. Paul's Theological Seminary (SPTS) in Jordan, Guimaras is the regional seminary of the Church serving the Visayas and Mindanao Dioceses.

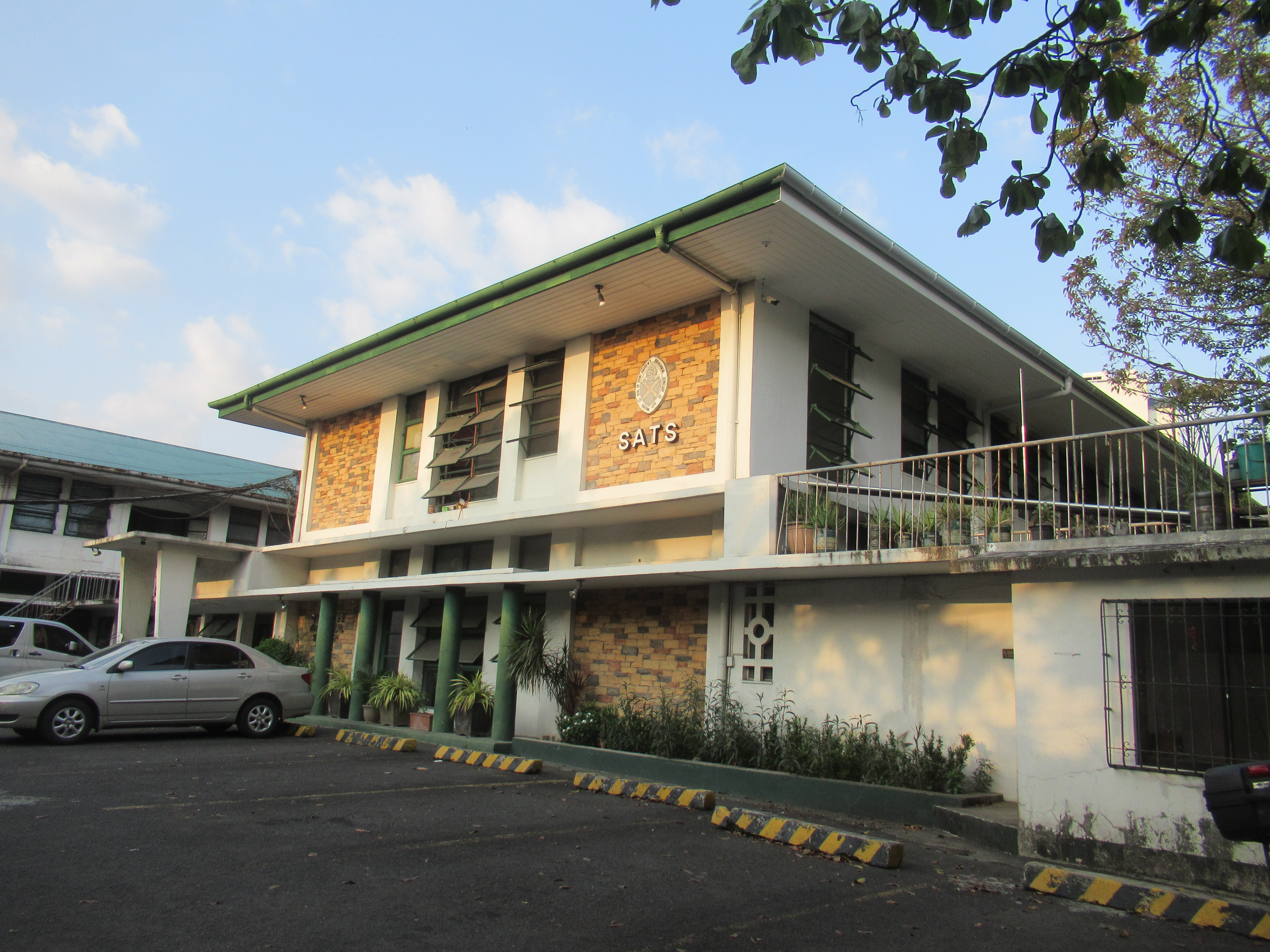
Saint Andrew's Theological Seminary (SATS)

The St. Andrew's Theological Seminary (SATS) in Quezon City is run by the Episcopal Church in the Philippines, serving both its church and the Iglesia Filipina Independiente.

Another seminary is planned to be established at Cabadbaran City in Mindanao.

== Relationship with other Christian denominations ==
=== Churches in communion ===
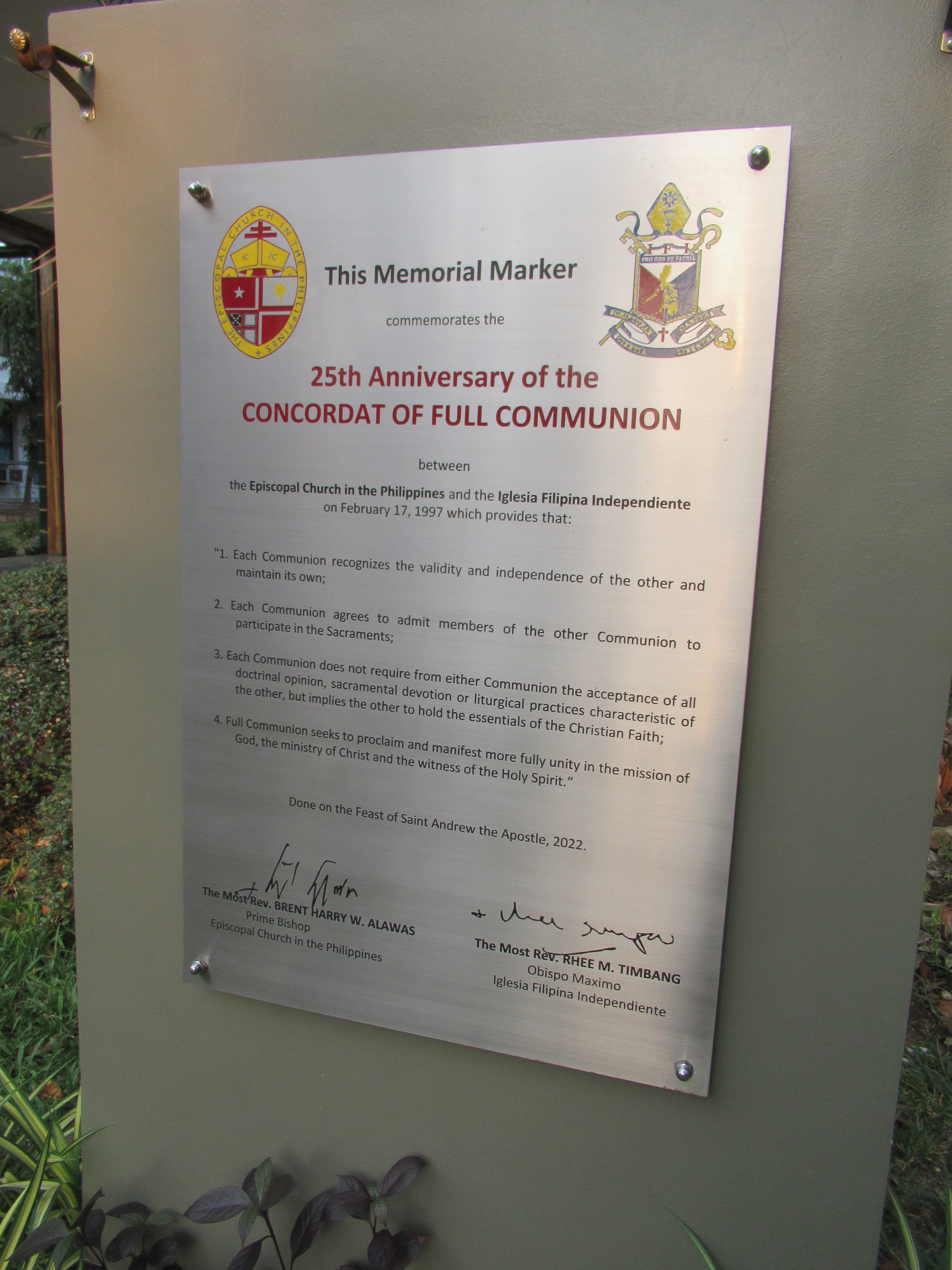
Historical memorial marker of the Concordat of Full Communion between the Iglesia Filipina Independiente and the Episcopal Church in the Philippines.

The church enjoys full communion with the Protestant Anglican Communion and the Episcopal Church in the United States since September 22, 1961.

Other churches the IFI is in full communion with include (mostly members of the Anglican Communion): the Church of England, the Scottish Episcopal Church, the Union of Utrecht, the Episcopal Church in the Philippines, the Church in the Province of the West Indies, the Church of the Province of Central Africa, the Church of the Province of West Africa, the Anglican Church of Kenya, the Anglican Church of Tanzania, the Church of North India, the Church of South India, the Church of Pakistan, the Church of the Province of Myanmar, the Church of Ceylon (extra-provincial), the Nippon Sei Ko Kai, the Church of Ireland, the Lusitanian Catholic Apostolic Evangelical Church (extra-provincial), the Anglican Church of Canada, the Church of Uganda, the Anglican Church of Rwanda, the Anglican Church of Burundi, the Spanish Reformed Episcopal Church (extra-provincial), the Anglican Church of Southern Africa, the Anglican Church in Aotearoa, New Zealand and Polynesia, the Old Catholic Church of Austria, the Old Catholic Church of the Czech Republic, the Old Catholic Church of Germany, the Old Catholic Church of the Netherlands, the Christian Catholic Church of Switzerland, the Polish National Catholic Church of America, the Old Catholic Church of Croatia, the Anglican Episcopal Church of Brazil, and the Church of Sweden.

=== Current ecumenical relations with the Catholic Church ===
The Iglesia Filipina Independiente has been in an ongoing interreligious dialogue with the Catholic Church since the latter part of the 20th century and their "joint statements" were eventually made official in 2021.

On August 3, 2021, during the IFI's 119th Proclamation Anniversary and as part of celebrating 500 years of Christianity in the Philippines, Catholic Church leaders from the Catholic Bishops' Conference of the Philippines (CBCP) signed two documents with the IFI "for more ecumenical cooperation amidst diversity." Although the IFI still remains to be independent from the Holy See, in the first joint statement, both IFI and Catholic Church leaders "ask and pray for mutual forgiveness for any injuries inflicted in the past" and "strive for the healing and purification of memories among its members". In addition, the first statement also notes that the IFI as well, "strives to reach out for healing and reconciliation with other separated Churches founded in the Aglipayan tradition".

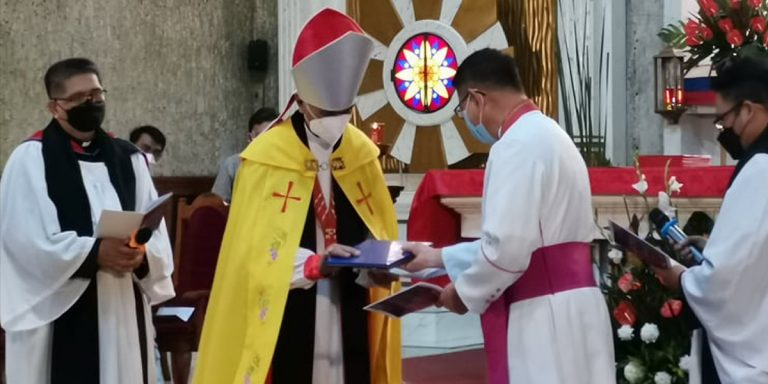
Leaders of both the IFI and the Catholic Bishops' Conference of the Philippines (CBCP) during the signing of their mutual agreement and recognition amidst their diversity, as part of celebrating 500 years of Christianity in the Philippines in 2021, held at the IFI National Cathedral. Seen in the photo is then-Supreme Bishop Rhee Timbang presenting the IFI's liturgical book to CBCP representatives.

The second joint statement, on the other hand, is an expression of mutual recognition by both churches, emphasizing the "mutual recognition of baptisms" between the IFI and the Catholic Church. The Trinitarian baptismal formula of the IFI has already been recognized by the Catholic Church in its list of validly administered baptisms by other Christian churches. For years, IFI officials had been seeking the recognition of their baptismal rites by the Catholic Church, notably the blessing of Pope Francis during his state visit to the Philippines in 2015, in order to ease inter-denominational marriages, so that Aglipayans will not be obliged anymore to be baptized as Catholics before they could marry Catholics.

Then-IFI Supreme Bishop Rhee Timbang gave a copy of the IFI's liturgical book and directory to CBCP Secretary-General Msgr. Bernardo Pantin during the liturgical launching of the two documents at the IFI National Cathedral.

Further, the IFI accepts baptized individuals from the Catholic Church who wanted to join their church without the requirement of performing another baptism from their end. They are being accepted through the IFI Rite of Reception officiated by the bishop or in his/her absence, by the priest or deacon, after a necessary catechism course to be taken.

=== Other ecumenical relations ===
The IFI is a member of inter-church associations such as the National Council of Churches in the Philippines (NCCP), Christian Conference of Asia (CCA), Council of Churches of East Asia (CCEA), United Society Partners in the Gospel (USPG), and the World Council of Churches (WCC). The church maintains ecumenical ties with other denominations who are also conciliar members of the aforementioned organizations, such as the United Church of Christ in the Philippines (UCCP) which is an IFI covenant church partner ("partnership covenant").

== Notable members ==
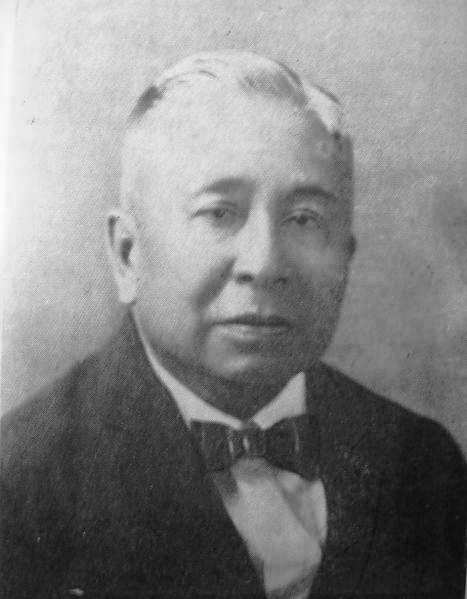
Isabelo de los Reyes, Sr., the proclaimer of independence of the Philippine Independent Church

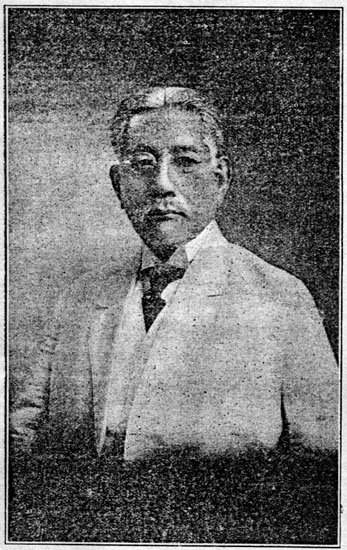
Pascual H. Poblete

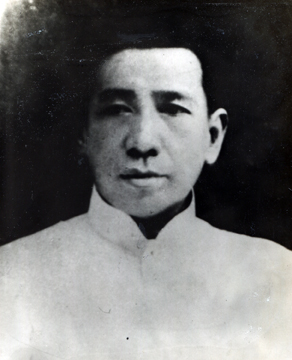
Ladislao Diwa

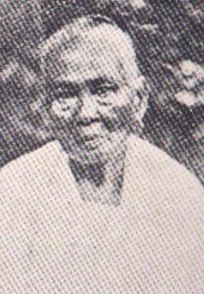
Melchora Aquino

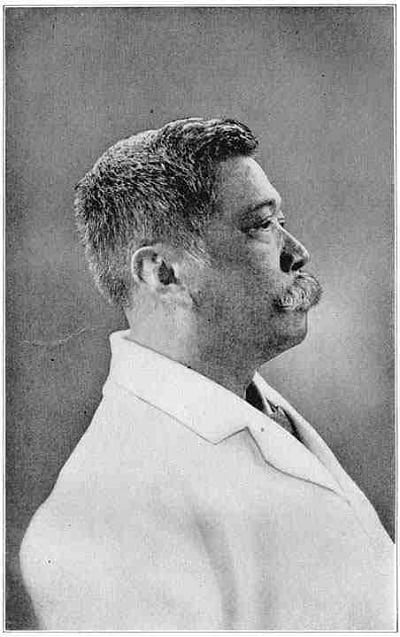
Felipe Buencamino

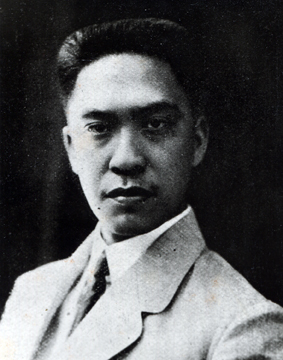
Vicente Sotto

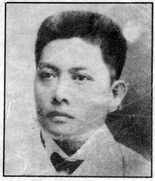
Santiago Álvarez

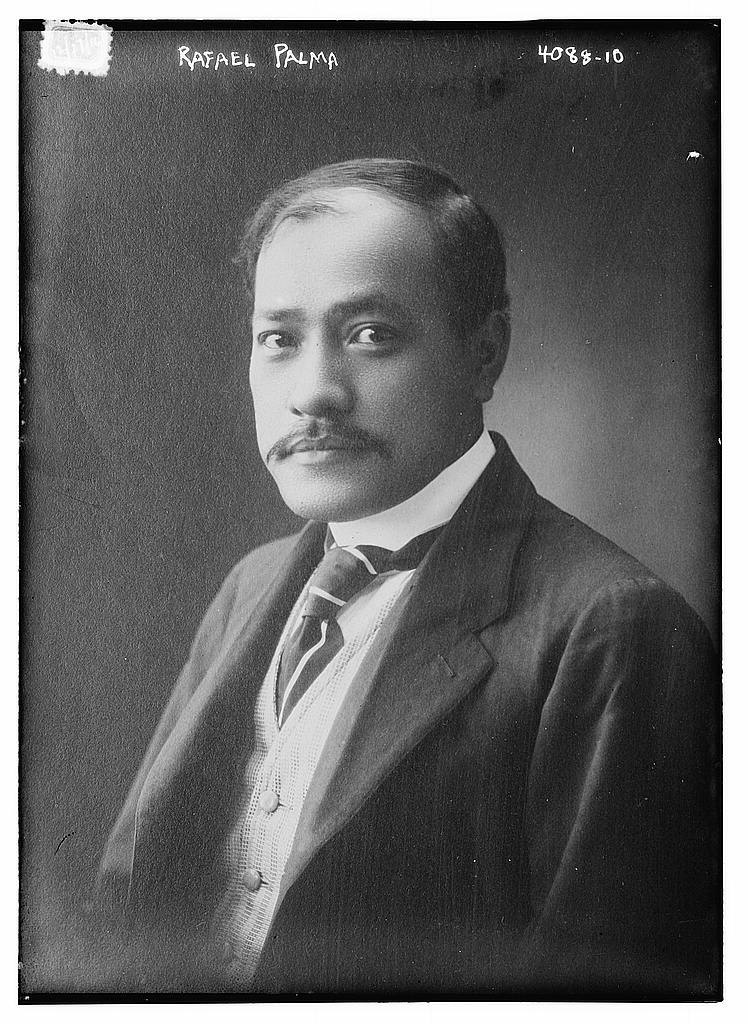
Rafael Palma

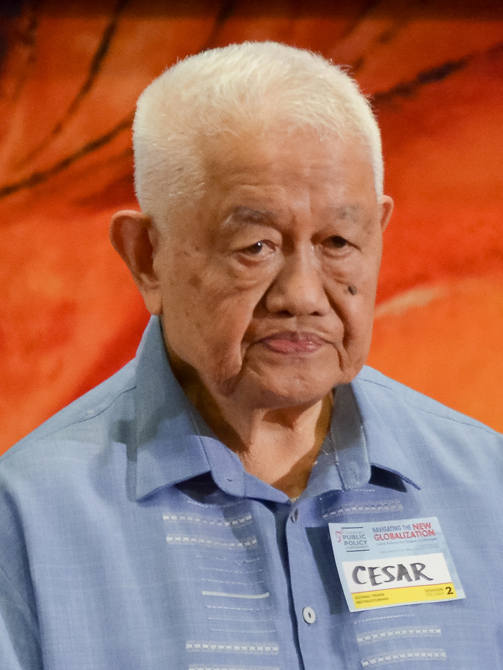
Cesar Virata

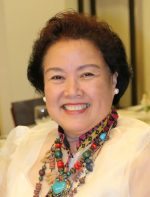
Rhodora Cadiao

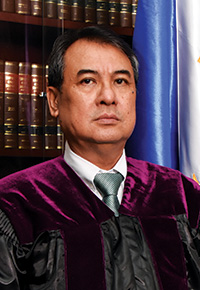
Alexander Gesmundo

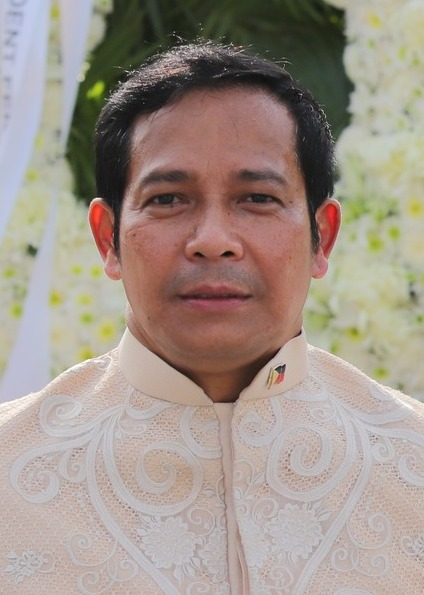
Daniel Fernando

=== Supreme bishops ===
- Gregorio Aglipay – first supreme bishop of the church and vicar-general of the Revolutionary Government from 1898 to 1899. The only cleric-delegate present during the creation of the Malolos Constitution.
- Alberto Ramento – ninth supreme Bishop of the IFI; assassinated in 2006 for being a government critic and an active campaigner against human rights violations in the Philippines.
- Ephraim Fajutagana – twelfth supreme bishop of the IFI from 2011 to 2017 and former chairperson of the National Council of Churches in the Philippines.
- Rhee Timbang – thirteenth supreme bishop of the IFI from 2017 to 2023.
- Joel Porlares – fourteenth and current supreme bishop of the IFI since 2023.

=== Church officials ===
- Fernando Buyser – IFI bishop and former head of the Supreme Council of Bishops. Also popularly known as a prolific figure in Cebuano literature; best known as the inventor of the Cebuano sonnet form called sonanoy.
- Don Isabelo de los Reyes, Sr. – also known as Don Belong; a prominent Filipino politician, writer, and labour activist in the 19th and 20th centuries. He proclaimed the establishment of the IFI. He is often called the "Father of Filipino Socialism" for his writings and activism with labour unions, most notably the Unión Obrera Democrática Filipina. He was also the first to translate the Bible in Ilocano. He was a lay leader and the de facto principal theologian of the IFI during its early years. He became an Honorary Bishop in 1929, while his son, Isabelo Jr., would later become supreme bishop in 1946.
- Gardeopatra Quijano – dentist, educator, and feminist writer. National President of the Women of the Philippine Independent Church (WOPIC) (1975–1977). Daughter of IFI Bishop Juan P. Quijano.

=== Bureaucrats ===
- Felipe Buencamino, Sr. – lawyer; co-writer of the Malolos Constitution and Secretary of Foreign Relations of the First Philippine Republic. One of the first and pioneering members of the IFI during its inception.
- Alexander Gesmundo – jurist; 27th and incumbent Chief Justice of the Philippines since 2021.
- Hilaria del Rosario de Aguinaldo – first wife of the first Philippine President, Gen. Emilio Aguinaldo; officially considered as the first-ever First Lady of the Philippines from March 1897 – April 1901.
- Cesar Virata – fourth Prime Minister of the Philippines (1981–1986) under the Interim Batasang Pambansa and the Regular Batasang Pambansa. One of the Philippines' business leaders and leading technocrats, he served as Finance Minister from 1970 during the Marcos dictatorship to becoming prime minister in 1981. He concurrently was finance minister throughout the 1980s. He is the grandnephew of the first Philippine president, Emilio Aguinaldo.

=== Literary artisans ===
- Hermenegildo Cruz – writer, who later became a member of the Philippine Assembly. A prominent member of Unión Obrera Democrática Filipina and one of the first and pioneering members of the IFI during its inception.
- José Garvida Flores – patriot, prolific Ilokano writer and playwright from Bangui, Ilocos Norte. Composed "Filipinas, Nadayag a Filipinas", which is sung during services of the IFI.
- Rafael Palma – prominent writer, bureaucrat, and lawyer-turned-politician from Manila; fourth President of the University of the Philippines.
- Pascual H. Poblete – writer and linguist, remarkably noted as the first translator of José Rizal's novel Noli Me Tangere into the Tagalog language. A prominent member of Unión Obrera Democrática Filipina and one of the first and pioneering members of the IFI during its inception.
- Lope K. Santos – playwright, writer, poet, politician, and nationalist. Born in Pasig and raised in Pandacan, Manila, he introduced the now-obsolete Abakada Tagalog spelling reform in 1940. Also known by the moniker, the "Father of the Filipino Grammar".
- Vicente Sotto – dramatist, writer, journalist, foremost anti-friar, the fiery Publisher–Editor of "Ang Suga" and "El Pueblo", and the prominent founder of the Filipino Church in Cebu, who later became a politician; grandfather of actor-politician Vicente "Tito" Sotto III and actor-comedian Vic Sotto; great-grandfather of Pasig mayor Vico Sotto.
- Aurelio Tolentino – prominent Pampango writer, dramatist, and one of the early and founding members of the secret society Katipunan. The foremost advocate of the establishment of the Filipino Church in Pampanga.

=== Military and revolutionary figures ===
- Edgar Aglipay – retired police officer with the rank of general; Chief of the Philippine National Police from 2004 to 2005 and Chief Deputy Director-General of the National Capital Region Police Office from 1998 to 2000 and 2001 to 2002; chairman emeritus of DIWA Partylist; incumbent provincial Governor of Cagayan (since 2025); descendant of Gregorio Aglipay.
- Baldomero Aguinaldo – a revolutionary general and prominent member of the Katipunan; leader of Katipunan's Magdalo faction; elected President of the Comite de Caballeros (Gentlemen's Committee) of the IFI in Kawit, Cavite; had initially organized a local lay organization within the IFI in Binakayan, Kawit in 1904 which later became the splinter group Iglesia de la Libertad in 1938; cousin of Gen. Emilio Aguinaldo and grandfather of Cesar Virata.
- Mariano Álvarez – a revolutionary general and prominent member of the Katipunan from Noveleta, Cavite; leader of Katipunan's Magdiwang faction.
- Pascual Álvarez – a revolutionary general and inaugural Director of the Interior of the Tejeros Revolutionary Government; nephew of Mariano.
- Santiago Álvarez – a revolutionary general and the chief commander of the historic revolutionary forces at Dalahican, Cavite; nicknamed Kidlat ng Apoy ("Lightning of Fire") and the "Hero of the Battle of Dalahican"; son of Mariano.
- Melchora Aquino – a revolutionary who became known as Tandang Sora ("Old Sora") because of her age (84) when the 1896 Philippine Revolution broke out. She gained the titles "Grand Woman of the Revolution" and "Mother of Balintawak" for her contributions to the independence movement. She was among the Church's most prominent and devoted followers in Caloocan.
- Ladislao Diwa – one of the co-founders and high-ranking officials of the Katipunan from Cavite City; later became part of the revolutionary army when he joined the revolutionary troops in Cavite during the Philippine Revolution.
- Leandro Fullon – a revolutionary general who fought during both the Philippine Revolution and the Philippine–American War. Appointed as commanding general of all Filipino forces in the Visayas and became the liberator of Antique province. Later established and became the first Filipino governor of the Revolutionary Provincial Government of Antique.
- Mariano Noriel – a revolutionary general who fought during both the Philippine Revolution and the Philippine–American War. He led Filipino advance troops before the American army landed in Intramuros in 1898. He was the first president of the laymen organization of the IFI in Bacoor, Cavite.
- Paciano Rizal – a revolutionary general, appointed as brigadier general, during both the Philippine Revolution and the Philippine–American War; led the Battle of Calamba in Laguna. He was one of the foremost advocates of the establishment of IFI in Biñan, Laguna sometime in 1903 to 1904 after his retirement; popularly known as the older brother of José Rizal.

=== Physicians ===
- Dominador Gómez – nationalist and medical doctor, who later became a labor leader, writer, and a member of the Philippine Assembly. A prominent member of Unión Obrera Democrática Filipina and one of the first and pioneering members of the IFI during its inception.

=== Politicians ===
- Crispin Beltran – legislator and labour leader, also known as the "Grand Old Man of Philippine Labour". A member of the 13th Congress of the Philippines as party-list representative and former chair of Kilusang Mayo Uno (KMU), he was a major figure in contemporary Filipino history.
- Nicolas Buendia – assemblyman of Bulacan's first district from 1935 to 1941, 8th Governor of Bulacan, and senator from 1941 to 1946. One of the first and pioneering members of the IFI during its inception.
- Rhodora Cadiao – provincial Governor of Antique (2015 to 2025).
- Daniel Fernando – incumbent provincial Governor of Bulacan (2019 to present) and film/television actor.
- Mariano Marcos – lawyer, Japanese collaborator, and politician from Ilocos Norte. A Congressman from 1925 to 1931. He is best known for being the father of former president and dictator Ferdinand Marcos.
- Salvacion Z. Perez – former governor of Antique from 2001 to 2010; daughter of former Associate Justice Calixto Zaldivar.
- Gedeon G. Quijano – former governor of Misamis Occidental and physician. The longest-serving governor in the history of the province. Son of IFI Bishop Juan P. Quijano.
- Calixto Zaldivar – former representative of the Lone District of Antique (1934–1935), former provincial Governor of Antique (1951–1955), and former Associate Justice of the Supreme Court (1964–1974). Also a former president of the National Lay Organization of the IFI.

=== Former members ===
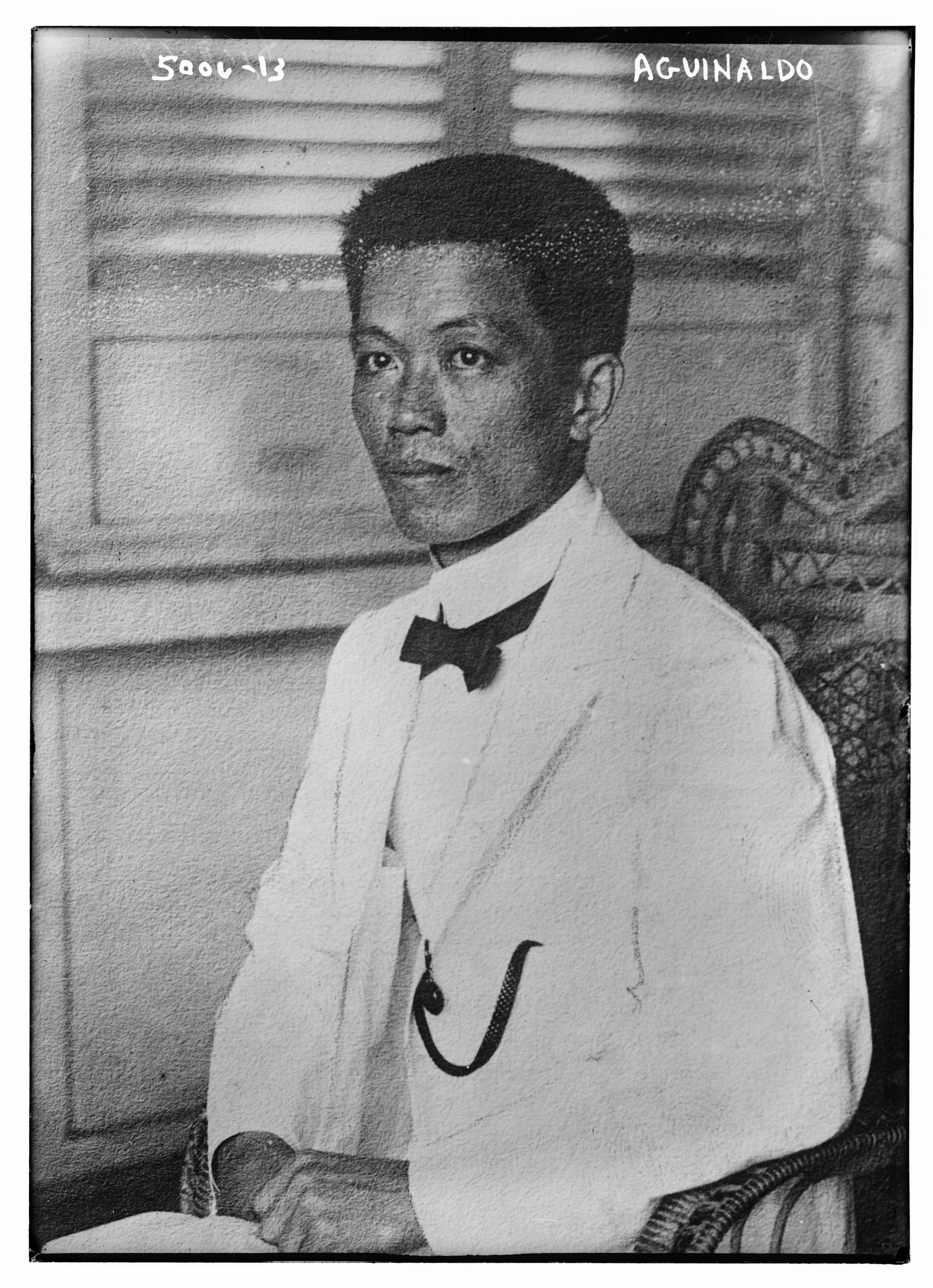
Emilio Aguinaldo

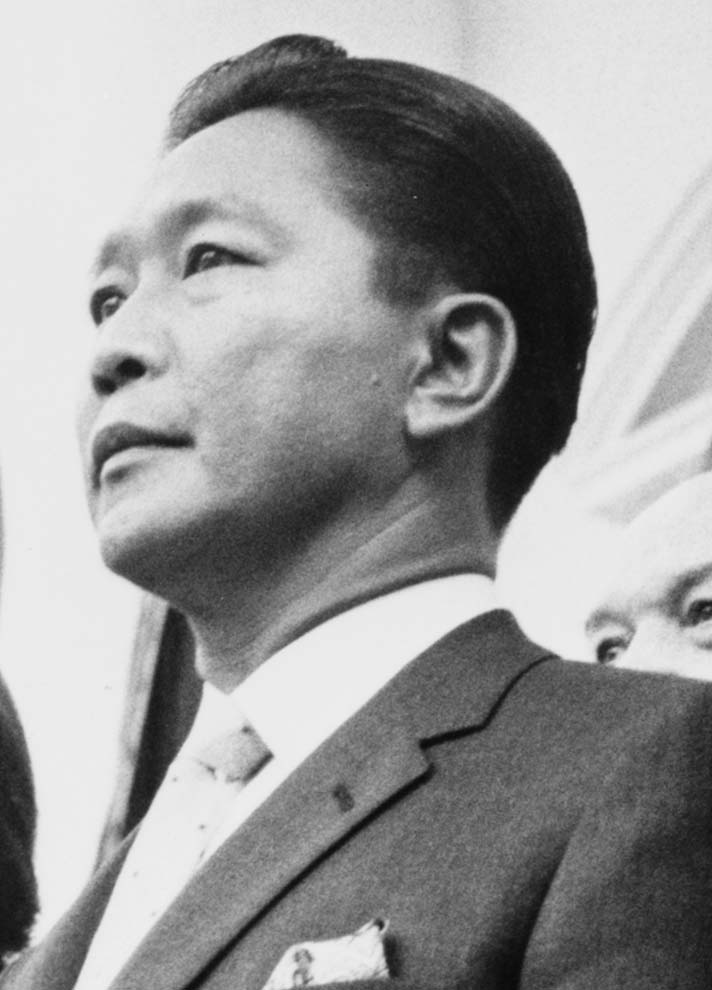
Ferdinand Marcos

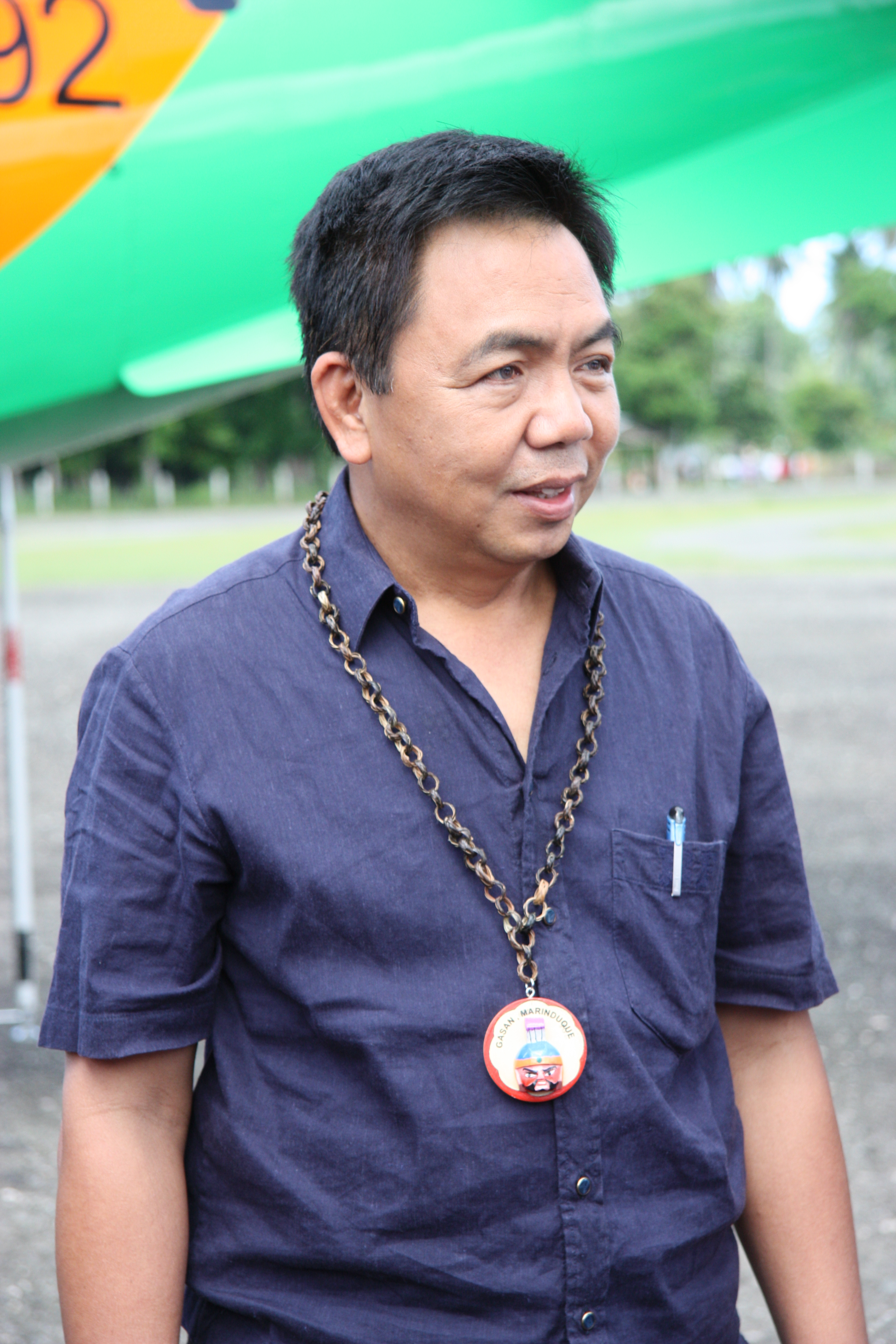
Bayani Fernando

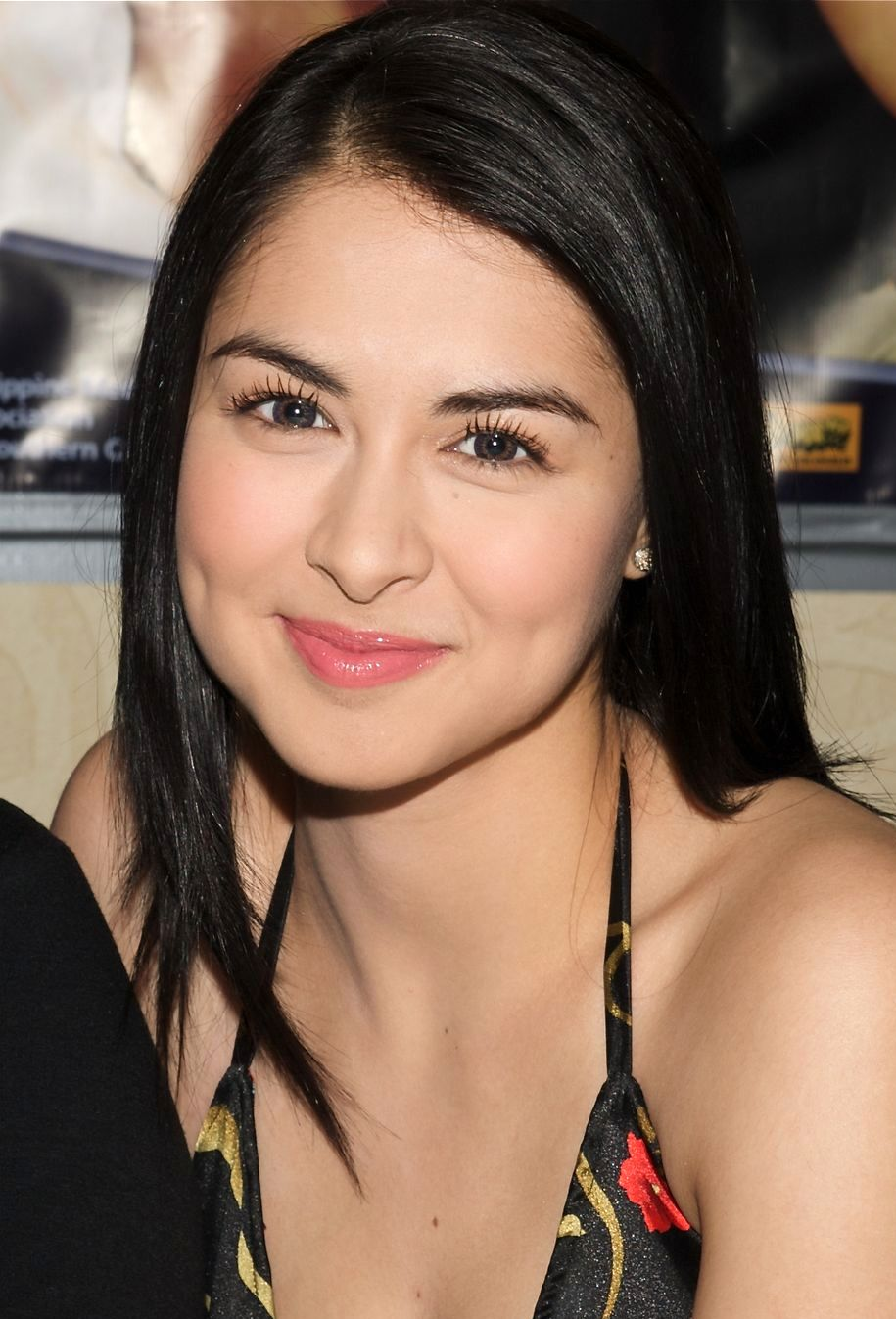
Marian Rivera

==== Supreme bishops ====
- Santiago Fonacier – second supreme bishop of the IFI from 1940 to 1946 who seceded and formed the offshoot Independent Church of Filipino Christians (ICFC); also served as Member of the Philippine Assembly from Ilocos Norte's 1st district from 1912 to 1916 and senator of the 1st senatorial district from 1919 to 1925.

==== Presidents ====
- Emilio Aguinaldo – first President of the Philippines. With his influence, together with other Caviteño revolutionary generals and officers, the IFI gained a stronghold in Cavite. His cousin, Baldomero, was the president of Comité de Caballeros (Gentlemen's Committee) of the IFI in Kawit; while his youngest sister Felicidad, his wife Hilaria del Rosario, and his mother Trinidad Famy were officers of the Comisión de Damas (Women's Commission) of the church. Subsequently reverted to Catholicism in old age.
- Ferdinand Marcos – former president and dictator of the Philippines (1965–1986); son of Mariano. Baptized and raised Aglipayan, but subsequently converted to Catholicism to marry Imelda Romualdez of Leyte.

==== Entertainment personalities ====
- Marian Rivera – television and film actress, model. Baptized in a catholic denomination in Spain, which is not validly recognized by the Catholic Church, and became an adherent to the Iglesia Filipina Independiente and practitioner of the Aglipayan faith upon moving to the Philippines; re-baptized in the Catholic Church to marry fellow actor Dingdong Dantes in 2014, seven years before the mutual recognition of baptisms between the IFI and the Catholic Church.

==== Lawyers ====
- Ferdinand Topacio – renowned lawyer known for his controversial high-profile cases involving clients who are high-ranking government officials and celebrities. Born and raised Aglipayan, but subsequently converted to Iglesia ni Cristo in middle age.

==== Other politicians ====
- Juan Ponce Enrile – politician, bureaucrat, and lawyer, known for being a multi-termed senator; assemblyman of Cagayan from 1984 to 1986; assemblyman of Region II from 1978 to 1984; member of the Philippine House of Representatives from Cagayan's 1st district (1992–1995); 37th Secretary of Justice; 15th Minister of National Defense; 26th President of the Senate of the Philippines; and Chief Presidential Legal Counsel from 2022 until his death in 2025. Baptized and raised Aglipayan, but converted to Catholicism at age 20.
- Bayani Fernando – former congress representative, former mayor of Marikina, and former chairman of the Metropolitan Manila Development Authority. Later converted to Catholicism.

== See also ==
- Anglican Rite Jurisdiction of the Americas
- Christianity in the Philippines
- Our Lady of Balintawak
- Our Lady of Maulawin
- Gregorio Aglipay National Shrine
- Philippine Independent Catholic Church
- Protestantism in the Philippines
- Liberation theology
