= Gardeopatra Quijano =

Filipino Visayan writer and first feminist Cebuano fictionist

- Born: Gardeopatra Gador Quijano; April 27, 1918; Alcantara, Cebu, Philippine Islands
- Died: May 3, 2003 (aged 85)
- Other name: "Dok Garding"
- Occupations: Dentist; Teacher; Writer
- Writing career
- Pen name: Flora Burgos; Gerardo Largavista
- Language: Cebuano
- Genres: Novel; Short Story; Poem
- Literary movement: Feminism

Gardeopatra Gador Quijano (April 27, 1918 – May 3, 2003) was a Filipino Visayan dentist, teacher, writer, and fiction author known for her novel, Lourdes, which is regarded as the first feminist novel written in the Cebuano language. She is considered the first Cebuana feminist fiction writer and was awarded the Gawad CCP para sa Sining in 1993.

== Early life ==
Quijano was born in Alcantara, Cebu, Philippines on April 27, 1918. She was the eldest daughter of the nine children of Aglipayan bishop and Cebuano writer Juan P. Quijano and Segundina Gador and attended schools in Cebu, Lanao, Manila, and Oroquieta in Misamis Occidental. Former Misamis Occidental governor Gedeon Quijano was her older brother. She became a college teacher and a dentist, whereby people call her the nickname "Doktor or Dok Garding". She settled in Oroquieta for most of her life and remained unmarried.

== Writing ==
Quijano was the first feminist fictionist in Cebuano literature and one of the early pre-war short story writers. She had written two novels and over 150 stories and wrote for periodicals The Freeman, Nasod (Nation), Babaye (Woman) and Bag-ong Kusog (New Force) and other publications before and after World War II. In addition, she used the pen names Flora Burgos and Gerardo Largavista, and was a poet, literary critic, essayist, translator and columnist. She won literary prizes for the short stories Maayong Ngalan (Noble Name) and Ang Asawa nga Dala sa Akong Uyoan (literal translation: The Wife that My Uncle Brought Home). She also led the Misamis chapter of the Cebuano writers group LUDABI (Lubas sa Dagang Binisaya), serving as its president from the late 1960s to 1970s, and initiated the first literary workshops in that part of the country, giving lectures on writing fiction and non-fiction.

=== Feminism ===
Feminist themes were prevalent in her writing particularly on women's concerns and domestic problems, advocating for education for women during the time when many girls did not go to school. In particular in her novel, Lourdes, the first feminist novel written in Cebuano language and which was serialized in Vicente Rama's prewar Cebuano newspaper Bag-ong Kusog from August to September 1939, spoke about women's right of suffrage and discussed themes on male-oriented discourse, child labor, and social contract inherent in utang na loob (debt of gratitude).

Being a single woman was also a theme explored in her published short story, Ang Babaye ug ang Panimalay (The Woman and the Household), which was printed in 1931. Critic Hope Yu commented that for Quijano, "Being unmarried is central to marriage, family and community if the woman's autonomy provides her with the necessary space to do excellent work."

=== Gawad CCP Para sa Sining ===
She was awarded the Gawad CCP Para sa Sining: Panitikang Rehiyunal (CCP Awards for the Arts for Regional Literature) from the Cultural Center of the Philippines in 1993. Part of the recognition read, "With numerous works in various genres published over a span of several decades, she is an enduring pillar of Philippine literature... Over the years she has been hailed as a feminist writer whose political beliefs and creative works inspired other women writers to follow the path she had blazed."

== Death ==
Quijano died on May 3, 2003. Her short stories are included in an anthology, Nabanhaw nga Himaya (Reawakened Bliss) translated into English by Hope Sabanpan Yu of University of San Carlos' Cebuano Studies Center and Haidee Emmie Palapar of Ramon Aboitiz Foundation Inc.
