= Gedeon G. Quijano =

Gedeon Gador Quijano

Governor of Misamis Occidental
- In office 1959–1964
- Preceded by: Diego Deling
- Succeeded by: Henry Regalado
- In office 1946–1954
- Preceded by: Angel Medina
- Succeeded by: Diego Deling

Personal details
- Born: Gedeon Gador Quijano; December 13, 1910 Alcantara, Cebu, Philippine Islands
- Died: May 15, 1989 (aged 78)
- Party: Liberal
- Spouse: Eugenia Jimenez Tagdulang

Gedeon Gador Quijano (Alcantara, Cebu, 13 December 1910 – 15 May 1989) was a Filipino politician, governor of Misamis Occidental, and later medical doctor in the United States at Salisbury – W.G. (Bill) Hefner VA Medical Center, U.S. Army Veteran and lawyer.

== Early life and education ==
He was the son of Bishop Juan P. Quijano and was the second eldest of nine children and older brother of Gardeopatra G. Quijano, a dentist and writer. He married Eugenia Tagdulang Quijano, a daughter of a landowner of from Tangub City. Gedeon and Eugenia had three children: Sela Quijano Borromeo, Dr. Zeus Hito T. Quijano, and Dr. Cari T. Quijano – all named after his allies at the time.

Quijano completed his studies at the University of the Philippines, along with his sister Gardeopatra and wife Eugenia. While in school, they all took turns in helping care for his eldest daughter Sela. Although Gedeon grew up as an Aglipayan, being the son of a Bishop of the Philippine Independent Church, his daughter attended Immaculada Concepcion, a Catholic all-girls school at the time. During the war he was recruited as a doctor in the U.S. Army, and his youngest son Cari was born while in hiding from the enemy in the jungle.

== Political career ==
As a doctor, Gedeon became very popular in his hometown treating poor people in the rural areas for free and charged only the rich. As a result, he was appointed Governor by President Manuel Roxas and was the "longest-serving governor of Misamis Occidental." Inspired by the admiration of the people he then pursued to widen his political endeavors and ran for governor in his province Misamis Occidental He won a landslide victory and became the youngest governor. He served four terms as governor, appointed in 1946, elected in 1947, 1951, and 1959, during a time of progress and growth. When he tried to run for another term against a wealthy opponent Henry Regalado who was also supported by a millionaire shipping liner owner Congressman William Chiongbian, he realized then it was a very tough competition. And lacking of funds he was forced to finance his political campaign by mortgaging his house. He was defeated and was offered a position under the administration of President Ferdinand Marcos. But he declined because he did not want to betray his faithful supporters by working under the opposite political party affiliation. Although Gedeon had befriended Marcos, during Marcos's term as Congressman and Senator, he spoke against him as president. Fearing prosecution Gedeon and Eugenia left the Philippines. They first lived in Virginia for a year and worked in the State Hospital, but he decided to move to Salisbury, North Carolina and accepted a job offer as a physiatrist at the Veteran's Administration Hospital.

Meanwhile, in the Philippines, rumors widely spread that President Marcos would declare martial law. Out of fear, Gedeon advised his children to emigrate to the U.S. before martial law was declared in 1972. He pleaded to the U.S. president and U.S. State Department for his daughter and family to be approved for immigration. He stayed active in the U.S. to help push for citizenship and benefits for Filipinos who fought in World War II with American troops. Two of his grandchildren served in the U.S. military.

Gedeon had served under five presidents, Manuel Roxas, Elpidio Quirino, Ramon Magsaysay, Carlos P. Garcia, and Diosdado Macapagal. With his growing power in the province, Gedeon was accused of having 500 personal agents of which he was cleared. He returned years later after Martial Law was lifted to his hometown in 1981, and while on vacation on May 15, 1989, he died from a stroke.

== See also ==
- Gardeopatra G. Quijano
- Filipino Veterans Fairness Act
- Misamis Occidental
- Oroquieta City
- Cebuano literature
