= Communism in the Philippines =

Communism in the Philippines emerged in the first half of the 20th century during the American colonial era of the Philippines. Communist movements originated in labor unions and peasant groups. The communist movement has had multiple periods of popularity and relevance to the national affairs of the country, most notably during World War II and the martial law era of the Philippines. Currently, the communist movement is dominated by the armed insurgency against the government.

The communist movement in the Philippines officially began in 1930 with the establishment of the Partido Komunista ng Pilipinas (PKP, Communist Party of the Philippines). The party was outlawed in 1932 by a decision from the Supreme Court, but was technically legalized in 1938. It then merged with the Partido Sosyalista ng Pilipinas (Socialist Party of the Philippines) and played a part in guerrilla warfare against the Japanese during the Second World War by way of the Hukbong Bayan Laban sa Hapon (HUKBALAHAP, The Nation's Army Against the Japanese). After the war, the PKP vacillated between taking a moderate stance and launching an armed insurrection. A series of setbacks culminated in the surrender of Luis Taruc, the Huk Supremo, and the liquidation of the PKP. The PKP was again officially outlawed by the government, this time by virtue of the Anti-Subversion Act of 1957.

In 1968, the Communist Party of the Philippines was reestablished by Jose Maria Sison (writing under the pseudonym Amado Guerrero). Its military arm, the New People's Army, was formed the next year and was headed by Bernabe Buscayno (under the nom de guerre "Commander Dante"). The CPP-Mao Tse Tsung Thought splintered from the old PKP, clashing with it ideologically, reflecting the Sino-Soviet Split. Its united front, the National Democratic Front of the Philippines, was established in 1973.

The CPP played a prominent role in the resistance against the dictatorship of Ferdinand Marcos. The NPA was the largest armed force that took up arms against the dictatorship. However, differences in ideology, strategy and tactics, and errors including the CPP's decision to boycott the 1986 Philippine presidential election led to a split in the CPP between "re-affirmists" and "rejectionists". The CPP is still currently the largest communist movement in the Philippines, waging a protracted people's war against the Philippine government while also engaged in on-and-off peace negotiations.

== History ==
=== Early history ===
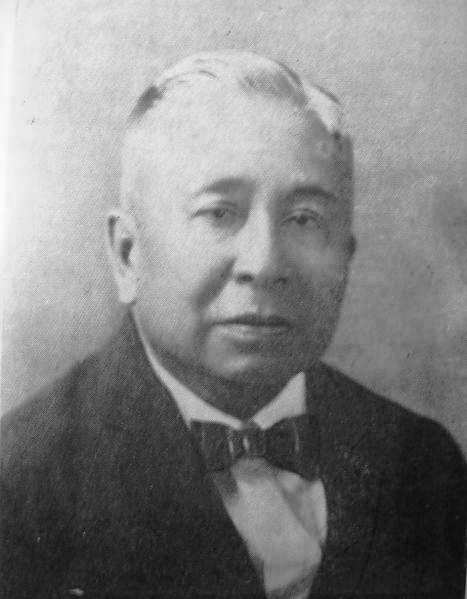
Isabelo de los Reyes, ilustrado, and considered to be father of Filipino Socialism

The first socialist and communist groups emerged as a result of the emergence of the labor movement in the Philippines. In 1901, Isabelo de los Reyes, an ilustrado, brought back what can be considered the first batch of socialist literature, consisting of writings by Proudhon, Bakunin, Malatesta, Marx and other leftists of the period. De los Reyes was influenced by Francisco Ferrer, an anarcho-syndicalist he met during a stay in Montjuïc prison in Barcelona, Spain.

Hermenegildo Cruz, a printer, established the first modern labor union in the country, the Union de Litografos y Impresores de Filipinas (ULIF). That same year, Cruz and de los Reyes formed the Unión Obrera Democrática (UOD), along with its official organ, La Redencion del Obrero. The UOD is considered to be the first trade union federation in the country.

The UOD was rechristened as the Union Obrero Democratica de Filipinas (UODF) by Dr. Dominador Gómez, who took over leadership of the UOD from De los Reyes. The UODF was instrumental in leading the first labor demonstration of Labor Day in the Philippines on May 1, 1903, but the organization was dissolved shortly after Gomez was arrested on charges of sedition.

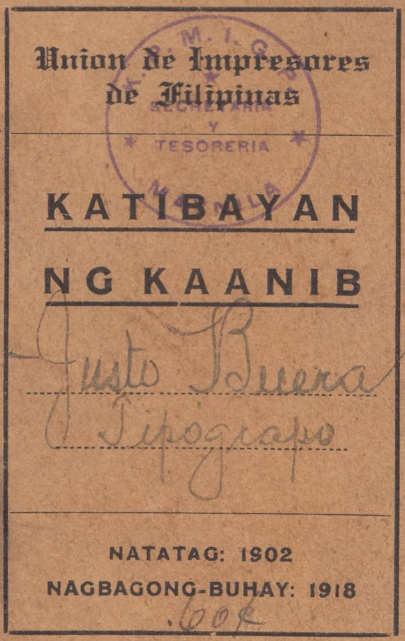
A certificate of membership (Katibayan ng Kaanib) to the UIF (c. 1918)

Multiple labor federations emerged in the wake of the UODF's dissolution, including the Union del Trabajo de Filipinas (UTF), headed by Lope K. Santos and formed with the assistance of the American Federation of Labor in an effort by the colonial government to steer organized labor along less controversial paths. In 1908, the UODF reemerged as a result of dissatisfaction in the UTF's moderate policies, as well as partisan politics. On May 1, 1913, the Congreso Obrero de Filipinas (COF) was founded, with Cruz as its first President, and both the UODF and UTF were dissolved. The COF would become the country's foremost labor center until 1929.

In 1922, Antonio Ora formed the Partido Obrero, a political party meant to challenge the dominant Nacionalista and Democrata parties, but failed to win any seats in the 1925 elections. Regardless, their relative success attracted the attention of Crisanto Evangelista and Jacinto Manahan, who headed the UIF and the KPMP, respectively. The Partido Obrero would eventually be the basis of the PKP.

In 1927, the COF decided to affiliate itself with the Red International of Labor Unions. Evangelista, Manahan, and Cirlio Bognot were sent to the Profintern conference in Moscow in March 1928. On their return, Evangelista organized the first batch of Filipino pensionados to study in the University of Toilers of the East, Moscow. Two more groups were sent in 1929 and 1930.

The COF would become increasingly split between a conservative faction led by Ruperto Cristobal, Isabelo Tejada, Domingo Ponce, and others. Along with a Left faction headed by Evangelista. In 1929, Evangelista's Left faction in the COF drafted a "thesis" calling for measures such as the creation of unions based on industrial lines, the creation of a true workers' party, and so on. This measure was blocked by the conservatives by allegedly using dummy labor delegates, and Evangelista's faction walked out of the convention, splitting the COF. Twelve days later on May 12, 1929, the Katipunan ng mga Anakpawis sa Pilipinas (KAP) was formed as a more militant and more progressive labor federation.

Outside Manila, peasant and labor organizations also began to take shape, such as the Pagkakaisa ng Magsasaka founded by Manuel Palomares, the Kapatirang Magsasaka established by Teodoro Sandiko, and Anak Pawis. The most influential of these was Kalipunang Pambansa ng mga Magbubukid sa Pilipinas (KPMP, National Union of Filipino Peasants), founded by Jacinto Manahan, a COF member.

In 1932, Pedro Abad Santos independently formed the Socialist Party of the Philippines (SPP) in Central Luzon. The next year, Abad Santos founded the Aguman ding Maldang Talapagobra (AMT, Union of the Toiling Masses). The AMT and the KPMP were both highly important in the peasant revolts and reforms of the 1930s, although neither group was formally socialist or communist. Members of both of these groups also formed a large section of the Hukbalahap.

=== Establishment of the PKP ===
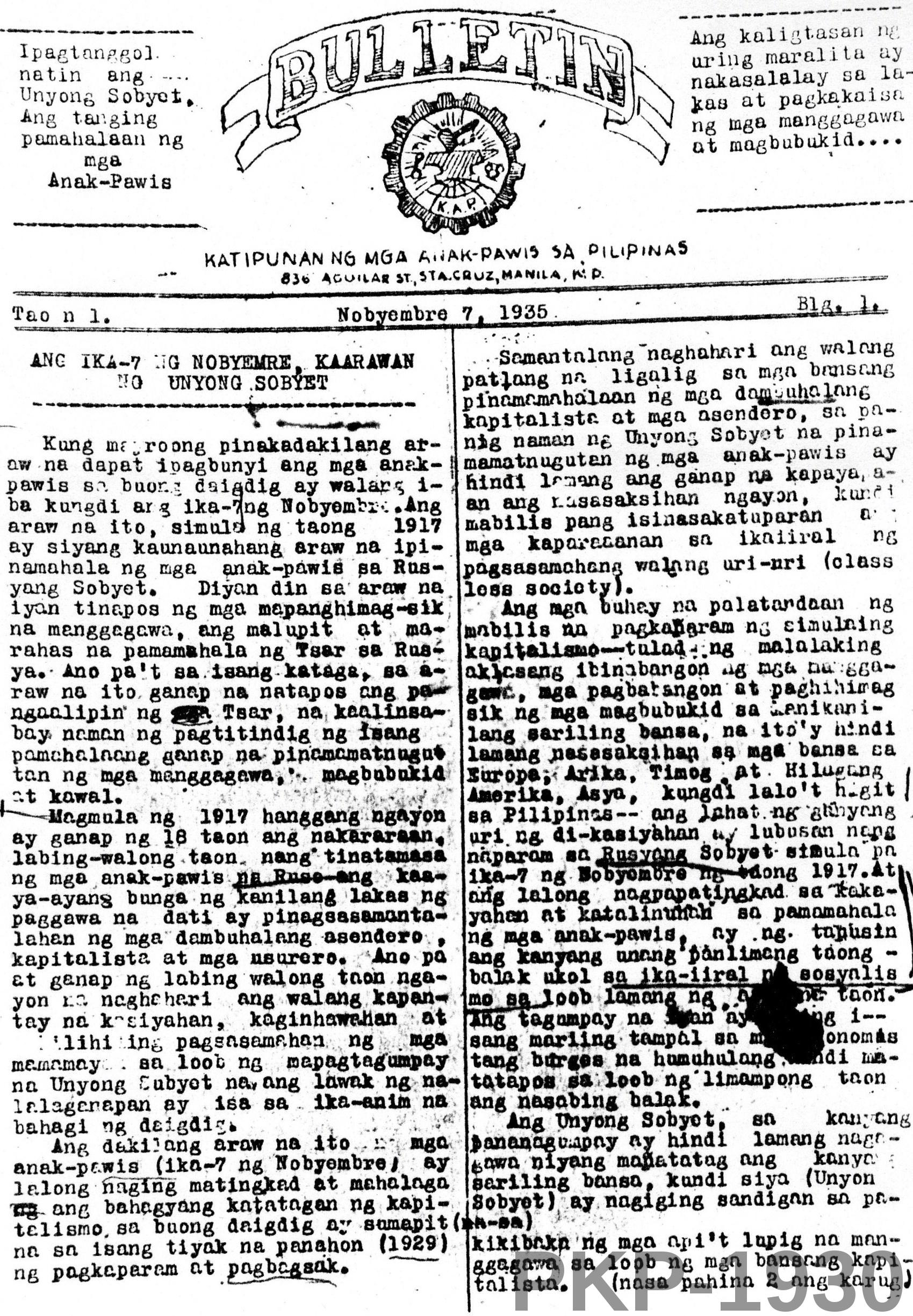
November 7, 1935 issue of the KAP bulletin

On August 26, 1930, Partido Komunista ng Pilipinas (PKP, Communist Party of the Philippines) was organized from members of the KAP and KPMP. The party itself was formalized as an official entity on November 7 of the same year. These two dates correspond with the Cry of Pugad Lawin and the Russian Revolution, respectively, symbolically linking the PKP with the nationalist and the communist revolutions.

Both the PKP and KAP were declared as illegal organizations by the Manila Court of First Instance (CFI) on September 14, 1931, sentencing twenty communist leaders of eight years and one day of banishment to the provinces. Evangelista was additionally sentenced with six months' imprisonment and a fine of 400 pesos for sedition. The convicted communists brought an appeal to the Supreme Court, which affirmed the Manila CFI decision on October 26, 1932. James S. Allen of the CPUSA persuaded Evangelista's group into taking a conditional pardon and intervened for their release. On December 24, 1938, Evangelista and others were granted a pardon and proceeded to enact a united front strategy.

The PKP also merged with Abad Santos' Partido Sosyalista, increasing its numbers and making up for lost time. The PKP established a Popular Front led by Abad Santos and participated heavily during elections in Central Luzon. The concept of a people's militia was conceived by party leaders as early as October 1941, when the PKP convened with other anti-fascist political groups, such as the League for the Defense of Democracy and the Friends of China.

During World War II, the top PKP leaders were arrested in Manila by invading Japanese forces, including Abad Santos, Evangelista, and Guillermo Capadocia. The Japanese also arrested Agapito del Rosario, the former vice-chairman of the SPP, and two relatives of Abad Santos. The second-front leadership under Dr. Vicente Lava took over the reins of the PKP and was elected general secretary.

In February 1942 a "struggle conference" was held in Cabiao, Nueva Ecija to discuss organization, strategy, and tactics. Several armed groups were immediately organized and began operating in Central Luzon. The guerrillas were eventually formally organized on March 29, 1942 as the Hukbalahap, eleven days before the Fall of Bataan. Although the Hukbalahap had a military commissariat which provided guidance to the Huks, the Hukbalahap itself was not a communist group, nor was it a communist group disguised as a nationalist one.

As the Huks quickly gained ground in Central Luzon, the PKP set out to establish Barrio United Defense Corps (BUDC) in Huk-controlled areas. The BUDC's served as a barrio-level government which was to maintain peace, order, and set up food production and recruitment in Huk-controlled areas, and overlapped between independently formed barrio governments, "neighborhood committees" set up by the Japanese, and BUDCs. On March 5, 1943, the Japanese struck the Huk headquarters in Cabiao, Nueva Ecija in a surprise attack, capturing many cadres and guerrillas.

In light of the aftermath of the Cabiao raid, PKP leadership began to adopt a "retreat for defense" policy, reducing the army organization to teams of three to five member groups and avoiding direct confrontation with the enemy. Most Hukbalahap squadrons did not follow such a policy, and a party conference in September 1944 declared the retreat for defense policy to have been erroneous. Vicente Lava was eventually removed as general secretary. By the end of the war, the Huks had 1,200 engagements, and inflicted some 25,000 enemy casualties. The Huks' strength consisted of 20,000 fully armed regulars and some 50,000 reservists.

At the end of the war and the return of American presence in the Philippines, USAFFE guerillas and former PC members forcibly disarmed Huk squadrons while charging other guerrillas of treason, sedition, and subversive activity. Huk leaders Luis Taruc, Casto Alejandrino, and other leaders were briefly arrested before being released by the Sergio Osmeña government. The PKP formally disbanded the Hukbalahap and formed the Hukbalahap Veterans' League (Hukvets) in an effort to get the Hukbalahap recognized as a legitimate guerrilla movement.

Election flyer advertising presidential and senatorial candidates of the Democratic Alliance-Nacionalista Popular Front Party

The PKP formed the Democratic Alliance, supporting Osmeña in the 1946 Presidential elections in an effort to defeat Manuel Roxas, who was seen as the lesser of two evils. The DA fielded candidates for Congress and Senate, including Vicente Lava, who was part of the PKP's Central Committee at the time. Six congressional candidates won, including Taruc, Juan Feleo, and Jesus Lava, but were prevented from taking their oaths in Congress by the Roxas administration, due to their opposition to the Bell Trade Act.

Continuing unrest in Central Luzon culminated in the killing of Juan Feleo. The Hukbalahap was revived as the Hukbong Mapagpalaya ng Bayan (HMB, People's Liberation Army) and launched an insurrection against the Roxas government. PKP leadership was split between supporting the armed struggle and opposing it, though Jose Lava would eventually get the reins of Party leadership and fully lend its support to the HMB.

The HMB rebellion peaked in 1950 at around 10,800 fighters. Under Jose Lava, the HMB planned to seize political power in "two years" and PKP members would bid each other goodbye with "See you in Malacañang!" The HMB launched "dress rehearsals" meant to test the overall capability and public reaction to their plan, but setbacks would result in Lava's arrest alongside other prominent leaders, including Federico Maclang, Ramon Espiritu, Honofre Mangila, Magno Bueno, Federico Bautista, Iluminada Calonge, Angel Baking, and Sammy Rodriguez.

Taruc surrendered on May 16, 1954, owing to disagreements with the Lava leadership. Most HMB fighters surrendered as well, with some like Casto Alejandrino continuing to fight well into the 60's, and others like Faustino del Mundo turning to armed banditry.

In 1957, the Anti-Subversion Law was enacted, outlawing the PKP, the HMB, and "any successors of any such organizations". Jesus Lava, a brother of Vicente and Jose Lava, had taken on the leadership of the Party and liquidated the HMB by transforming it into "organizational brigades." He also liquidated all basic units and organizations by enacting a "single-file" policy, before going underground. Lava continued to elude authorities until his arrest 9 years later, on May 21, 1964.

=== First Great Rectification Movement and PKP-CPP split ===
By the 1960s, the PKP was seeking to rebuild itself. Jesus Lava invited Jose Maria Sison, then a professor in the University of the Philippines and a prominent youth leader, to be a part of the PKP. Sison and others represented a "new generation" of Marxists who were decidedly Maoist in their leanings. Sison proposed a critique of the history of the PKP, which he submitted in 1966. Sison was highly critical of Lava and his policies during the past decade, referring to his "adventurism" and mishandling of the HMB rebellion. The document was suppressed and tensions between the Lava leadership and Sison's group grew, eventually causing in a split in PKP ranks in 1967.

The culmination of this split occurred on December 26, 1968, when Sison, using the nom de guerre Amado Guerrero, and twelve others formed the Communist Party of the Philippines. Sison's critique of the Lavas and the PKP was released under the title Rectify Errors and Rebuild Our Party!, which pointed out ideological, political, and organizational errors committed throughout the PKP's history. The following March, Sison established the New People's Army, its military arm. In 1969, Guerrero wrote Philippine Society and Revolution, building off his previous Struggle for National Democracy. These documents outlined the CPP's ideological, political, and organizational tasks under the theoretical basis of the Mao Zedong Thought.

The CPP and NPA quickly expanded nationwide. President Ferdinand Marcos blamed the CPP for the Plaza Miranda bombing in 1971, which the CPP has denied. The following year, Marcos declared Martial Law on September 21, 1972, under the pretext of "quashing the communist threat." Party cadres and activists were absorbed by the revolutionary movement in the countryside. On April 23, 1973, the National Democratic Front of the Philippines was established as an alliance of organizations supporting the CPP's protracted people's war.

Throughout the 1970s, CPP and NPA influence continued to expand despite attacks from the Armed Forces of the Philippines. Abuses under Martial Law pushed peasants in the countryside to join the NPA, while students, workers, Church members, and other sectors supported the CPP and its aims. Despite Sison's arrest in 1976, the CPP and NPA continued to expand, reaching a strength of 30,000 Party members and 25,000 NPA fighters across 69 of the country's 80 provinces by 1986.

In 1978, disagreements on whether or not to boycott the Interim Batasang Pambansa elections led to the suspension of the CPP's Manila-Rizal committee. Starting in 1977, debates within internal leadership resulted in the adoption of multiple strategies and tactics,. From 1981-83, the CPP and NPA adopted tactics such as a "strategic counter-offensive", urban insurrection, and "regularization" of the NPA as a result of debates within internal leadership on strategy and tactics, and the sudden growth in membership. These tactics encouraged a focus on military action, which contracted the CPP's mass base in the countryside and resulted in "tactical errors" such as the boycott of the 1986 elections.

After the fall of the Marcos dictatorship, the new Corazon Aquino administration was initially keen on peace negotiations with the CPP. The NDFP was tasked to represent the CPP's organs of political power in peace talks, but the NDFP pulled out of negotiations in 1987 due to a lack of support within the Aquino administration to negotiate, and the Mendiola Massacre. Peace talks between the Philippine government and the NDFP would continue on and off through the years.

Estrangement from the urban middle class, military setbacks, and the capture of leading cadres led to intensified splits within the Party. Fear of spies and "deep-penetration agents" resulted in multiple anti-infiltration campaigns such as the 1985-86 Kampanyang Ahos (Garlic Campaign) in Mindanao, the 1988 Oplan Missing Link campaign in Southern Tagalog, and the 1989 Olympia campaign in Metro Manila. These campaigns were unsuccessful in rooting out spies, instead resulting in the arrest, torture, and execution of hundreds of cadres. Thousands more left the CPP. By 1992, the CPP reported that its strength was relatively equal to 1982-83 levels. Other cadres pushed for a form of popular democracy, or wanted to focus on parliamentary struggle, or to remove the leading role of the CPP in the NPA and the NDFP. In 1986, the Lumbaya company, led by Conrado Balweg, splintered from the NPA over ideological differences and established the Cordillera People's Liberation Army. Shortly after, it engaged in peace negotiations and has since laid down arms.

=== Second Great Rectification Movement ===
By 1991, the CPP recognized that there was a growing need for a comprehensive rectification movement. In 1992, the CPP held a plenum to discuss the documents Stand for Socialism Against Modern Revisionism and Reaffirm our Basic Principles and Rectify Errors, which repudiated and summed-up the various errors in strategy and tactics over the past decade, and upheld the correctness of a protracted People's War strategy. This reaffirmation caused a split between members of the Party, reducing the CPP's strength but streamlining the Party's organization by decreasing the autonomy of regional committees and aligning the party ideologically. Those who rejected the reaffirmation, or "rejectionists" went on their separate ways, although not all rejectionists were united.

Prominent personalities who rejected the plenum's decisions included Romulo Kintanar of the NPA General Staff Command, Ricardo Reyes, a former member of the Executive Committee and the Political Bureau of the CPP Central Committee, Arturo Tabara, head of the standing committee of the Visayas Commission, and Filemon Lagman, the secretary of the CPP's Manila-Rizal regional committee. They were eventually expelled from the CPP.

In 1993, the CPP's Manila-Rizal regional committee formally announced its decision to split from the CPP. The party's Visayas Commission (VisCom), National United Front Commission (NUFC), Home Bureau of the International Liaison Department and the National Peasant Secretariat (NPS) also rejected the decisions of the 1992 plenum. In 1994, the former members of the Manila-Rizal, Visayas, and Central Mindanao committees held a Party Conference and formed the People's Communist Party, which eventually became the Rebolusyonaryong Partido ng Manggagawà ng Pilipinas (RPM-P, Revolutionary Workers' Party of the Philippines).

Differences between the former Party commissions and individuals like Lagman and Tabara resulted in another split within the rejectionist ranks. The RPM-P established the Revolutionary Proletarian Army in 1996 and linked itself with the Alex Boncayao Brigade, a split faction of the NPA headed by Nilo de la Cruz. In 1998, elements of the CPP's Central Luzon committee were expelled from the CPP, leading them to establish the Marxist-Leninist Party of the Philippines. The MLPP established its armed wing, the Rebolusyonaryong Hukbong Bayan shortly after. In 2001, Mindanao cadres of the RPM-P split to form the Rebolusyonaryong Partido ng Manggagawa ng Mindanao (RPM-M, Revolutionary Workers' Party of the Mindanao) over disagreements with the RPM-P's decision to surrender to the Philippine government.

Other rejectionists rejected the armed struggle and went-above ground. Lagman established Sanlakas as a multi-sectoral mass organization, and the Bukluran ng Manggagawang Pilipino as a trade federation. Sonny Melencio, splitting from the Manila-Rizal commission, established the Liga Sosyalista (Socialist League) in 1998, which eventually merged with the PKP-1930 and established the Sosyalistang Partido ng Paggawa (SPP, Socialist Labor Party) in 1998. Joel Rocamora, Edicio de la Torre, and others established Akbayan in 1998 and has so far experienced the most success in participating in parliamentary elections.

Peace talks between the Philippine government and the NDFP continued, culminating in the Comprehensive Agreement to Respect Human Rights and International Humanitarian Law (CARHRIHL) in 1998. Further talks broke down shortly after under the President Joseph Estrada, but intermittently continued under Gloria Macapagal-Arroyo, Benigno Aquino III, and Rodrigo Duterte. The NPA continues to wage armed struggle all over the Philippines. The RPM-P/RPA-ABB surrendered to the Philippine government in 2000, but peace negotiations remain unfulfilled following a 2007 split in the RPA-ABB leadership between Nilo de la Cruz and Veronica Tabara-Stephen Paduano.

== Ideology ==
=== Early ideologues ===
Isabelo de los Reyes is credited with bringing to the Philippines the works of Marx, Proudhon, Bakunin, and Malatesta. Malatesta's Propaganda socialista fra contadini was particularly familiar to union organizers. During his time as the UTF's President, Lope K. Santos gave evening classes alongside Hermenegildo Cruz in what was known as a "School of Socialism" to interested unionists. Studies focused on European radical texts, including Marx, Emile Zola, Elisee Reclus, Maxim Gorky, and others. The School of Socialism produced students such as Crisanto Evangelista, Arturo Soriano, Melanio de Jesus, and Felipe Mendoza.

Evangelista became radicalized through meetings with Harrison George of the Communist Party of the United States of America, Tan Malaka of the Communist Party of Indonesia, and Zhou Enlai of the Chinese Communist Party. From 1928–1930, the COF sent pensionados to Moscow to study at the University of Toilers of the East.

=== Current parties and ideologies ===
Communist parties in the Philippines officially claim themselves to be ideologically Marxist-Leninist or Marxist-Leninist-Maoist.

The Partido Komunista ng Pilipinas, in its constitution, refers to itself as the "political party of the Filipino working classes based on the principles of scientific Communism and Marxism-Leninism." Members of the PKP are required to "understand the principles of Marxism-Leninism."

The Communist Party of the Philippines, which splintered from the PKP-1930 in 1968, upholds the Mao Zedong Thought as its theoretical basis. In its 2016 Constitution, it states that "The universal theory of Marxism-Leninism-Maoism is the guide to action of the Communist Party of the Philippines."

In the wake of the Second Great Rectification Movement, splinter groups have emerged from the CPP, with differences in ideology. The Rebolusyonaryong Partido ng Manggagawa ng Pilipinas, and its splinter group Rebolusyonaryong Partido ng Manggagawa - Mindanao both reject the CPP's "vulgarized application" of Marxism-Leninism and has described them as "Stalinist" while describing themselves as Marxist-Leninist. Both organizations also reject the CPP's analysis of Philippine society as "semi-colonial and semi-feudal", arguing instead that it is "semi-capitalist". The Partido ng Manggagawang Pilipino also describes itself as a Marxist-Leninist group that views Philippine society as capitalist, but it retains the option of armed struggle in its program. Meanwhile, the Marxist-Leninist Party of the Philippines refers to itself as Maoist but disagrees with the CPP on key ideological and organizational issues.

== Major organizations ==
Maoist parties waging people's war:

- Communist Party of the Philippines
  - New People's Army
  - National Democratic Front of the Philippines
- Marxist-Leninist Party of the Philippines
  - Rebolusyonaryong Hukbong Bayan

Marxist-Leninist parties:

- Rebolusyonaryong Partido ng Manggagawa sa Pilipinas
  - Revolutionary Proletarian Army
  - Alex Boncayao Brigade
- Revolutionary Workers' Party - Mindanao
  - RPMM-Revolutionary Proletarian Army
- Partido ng Manggagawang Pilipino
  - Armadong Partisano ng Paggawa
- Partido Komunista ng Pilipinas-1930
  - Hukbong Mapagpalaya ng Bayan _{(defunct since 1957)}

Defunct parties:

- Partido Marxista-Leninista ng Pilipinas _{(most probably defunct since 2007)}
  - PMLP-Partisano

== See also ==
- Communist armed conflicts in the Philippines
- Anarchism in the Philippines
- National Democracy (Philippines)
