= Anarchism in the Philippines =

Anarchism in the Philippines has its roots in the anti-colonial struggle against the Spanish Empire, becoming influential in the Philippine Revolution and the country's early trade unionist movement. After being supplanted by Marxism-Leninism as the leading revolutionary tendency during the mid-20th century, it experienced a resurgence as part of the punk subculture, following the fragmentation of the Communist Party of the Philippines.

== History ==
The roots of anarchism in the Philippines lie in the numerous Philippine revolts against Spain during the Spanish Colonial Period. One of the earliest signs of resistance was the Battle of Mactan, in which native warriors led by Lapulapu overpowered and defeated the forces of the Spanish Empire, resulting in the death of Ferdinand Magellan. A commonly cited revolt is the uprising led by Tamblot in 1621, during which 2000 indigenous rebels burnt down the Christian churches and monuments throughout the island of Bohol. This uprising spilled over to the island of Leyte, where the Bankaw revolt took place. The Spanish military brutally suppressed the uprisings and executed many of the rebels, under orders by the clergy. The Moro people also led a prolonged conflict against the Spanish in Mindanao, which prevented the empire from subjugating much of the southern archipelago for most of its history there.

The many diverse indigenous communities that inhabited the various islands of the archipelago were not submitted to any centralized nation-state. It was only with the subjugation of the islands by the Spanish Empire that these communities were forcibly integrated into a singular polity, a state that spanned the entire archipelago.

=== Anarchism in the national liberation movement ===
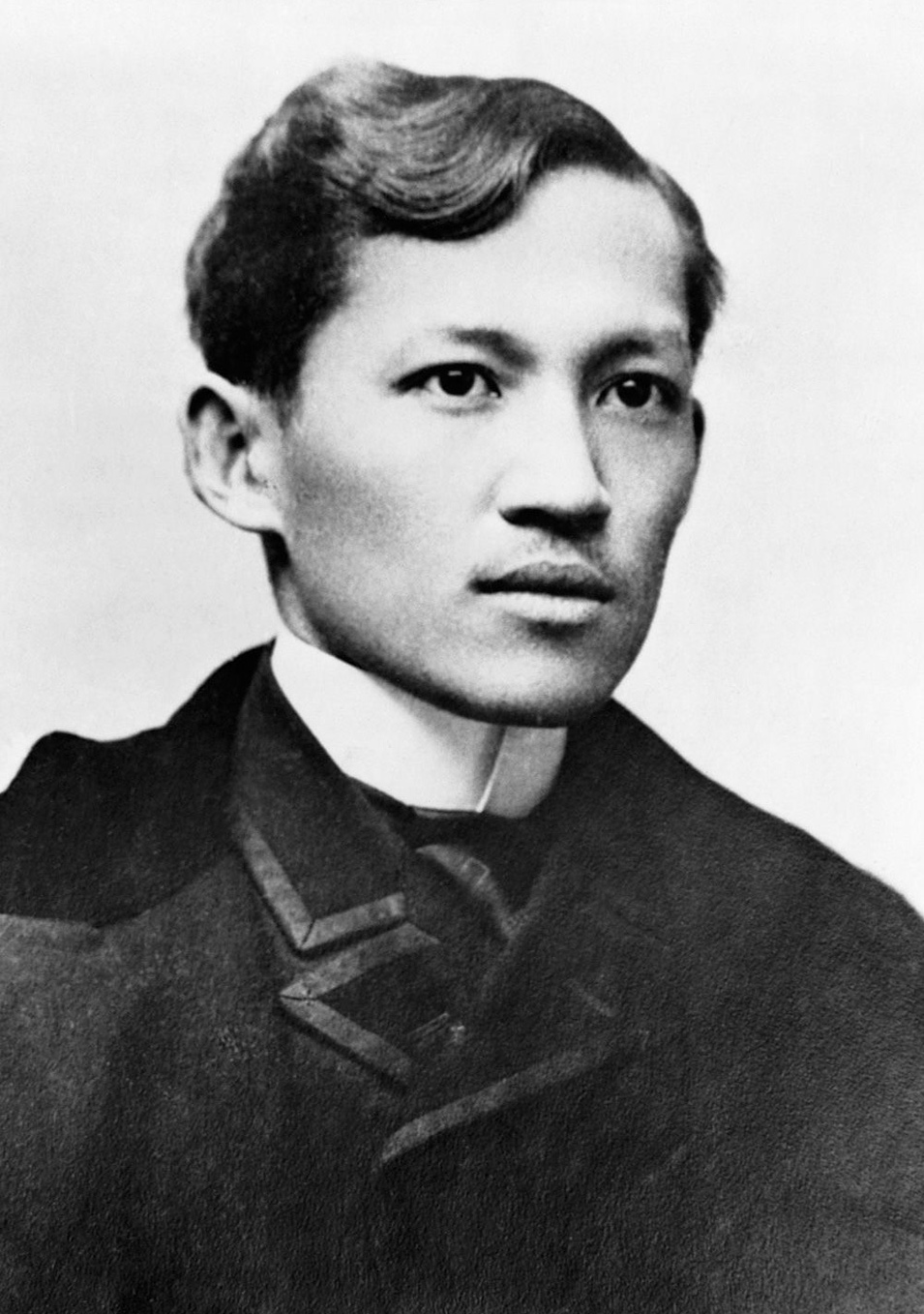
José Rizal, an author of the Propaganda Movement whose works were inspired by anarchism.

Filipino nationalism began to spread rapidly throughout the archipelago following the Glorious Revolution of 1868. A number of Filipino intellectuals, including José Rizal and Marcelo H. del Pilar, launched a Propaganda Movement which called for reforms to the governance of the Spanish East Indies. In 1890, Rizal had moved to Europe, where he became acquainted with the French and Spanish anarchist movements. In Spain, Rizal was mentored by the Proudhonist federalist Francisco Pi y Margall. The idea of propaganda of the deed particularly inspired Rizal's second novel El filibusterismo, which depicts a revolution of national liberation against the Spanish colonial authorities in the Philippines. In that book, Rizal depicted a failed attempt at propaganda of the deed through his character "Simoun" who tried to bomb a party attended by colonial elites. Upon his return to Manila in 1892, Rizal founded the La Liga Filipina, a secret society dedicated to mutual aid and the establishment of cooperatives, among other activities. Rizal was arrested for his activities in the league and deported to Dapitan. There he built a hospital, a water supply system and a school, where he taught and engaged in farming and horticulture.

Upon the deportation of Rizal, many Filipino nationalists established the Katipunan, another secret society, but this time with the aim of gaining independence from Spain through a revolution. Inspired by Rizal's works, the Katipunan organized an armed resistance to Spanish rule, led by Andrés Bonifacio. After the activities of the Katipun were discovered in August 1896, the Philippine Revolution began. Members of the Katipunan revolted in Caloocan, establishing the Tagalog Republic and declaring a nationwide armed revolution. Rizal, who had no part in the revolution himself, was court-martialed for rebellion, sedition and conspiracy. He was convicted on all charges and executed by firing squad. In 1897, Bonifacio was deposed and executed by Emilio Aguinaldo, who assumed the leadership of the revolutionary movement. After driving the Spanish out of the archipelago, Aguinaldo subsequently established a dictatorship and declared independence. However, the treaty of Paris officially ceded the Philippines to the United States, which ignited an armed conflict with the newly established First Philippine Republic.

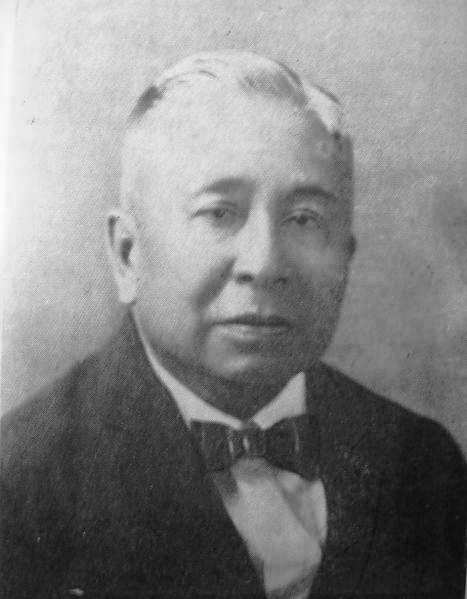
Isabelo de los Reyes, one of the leaders of the trade union movement in the post-revolutionary Philippines.

During the revolution, Isabelo de los Reyes was among the revolutionaries that was deported to Spain, where he was imprisoned in Montjuïc Castle. There he became acquainted with a number of anarchists and syndicalists, familiarizing himself with anarchist literature supplied by a sympathetic guard. After his release, he met a number of anarchist thinkers, including Francesc Ferrer, and read the works of Pierre-Joseph Proudhon, Mikhail Bakunin and Peter Kropotkin. After the surrender of Aguinaldo's forces and the establishment of the Insular Government in 1901, Isabelo was repatriated to Manila, bringing with him a large collection of anarchist and socialist literature. Inspired by anarcho-syndicalism, Isabelo organized a wave of workers' protests and strikes in Manila, leading him to establish the Unión Obrera Democrática (UOD), the country's first modern trade union federation. When the UOD called a general strike in August 1902, they came under police surveillance and Isabelo was arrested. Isabelo tendered his resignation from the UOD while in prison, but his work was carried on by the labor organizer Hermenegildo Cruz and the strike leader Arturo Soriano, who translated Errico Malatesta's dialogue Fra Contadini (Between Peasants) into the Tagalog language entitled Dalawang Magbubukid. The UOD eventually collapsed due to internal divisions, with the moderates led by Lope K. Santos forming the US-backed Unión del Trabajo de Filipinas (UTF), and the radicals led by Hermenegildo Cruz going on to form the Congreso Obrero de Filipinas (COF). Santos subsequently began writing Banaag at Sikat, a novel about two friends: one a socialist and the other an anarchist.

=== The rise of Communism ===
As part of the May Fourth Movement, Chinese anarchists established a cell in Manila, where they published anarchist literature for distribution throughout Southeast Asia. However, the dissolution of the UOD had already caused much the anarchist movement to go into remission throughout the archipelago. Anarchist ideas would persist among the peasantry, particularly within peasant unions such as the Aguman ding Maldang Talapagobra (AMT; League of Poor Workers), a front of the Socialist Party of the Philippines. These anarchist ideas were facilitated through literature introduced by Isabelo de los Reyes and Dominador Gómez within the Socialist Party. In the wake of the Russian Revolution, Marxism-Leninism began to take root in left-wing circles during the 1920s. Under the influence of the Partido Obrero de Filipinas, the COF became affiliated with the Red International of Labor Unions in 1927. This affiliation provoked a split between moderates and revolutionaries within the COF, eventually causing the disintegration of the union. In 1930, the Communist Party of the Philippines emerged from this split and began centralizing control of the workers' movement. The Communist Party was initially outlawed by the Supreme Court, but was later legalized after the Commonwealth of the Philippines was established, due to the growing threats from the Empire of Japan.

When the Japanese occupation of the Philippines began, a resistance movement was organized in the archipelago to wage a guerilla war against the occupation forces. Peasants led by Juan Feleo organized the Hukbalahap, which played a key role in wresting control of Luzon from the Japanese Empire. In 1945, the Japanese-sponsored Second Philippine Republic was brought down and the Commonwealth re-established.

Shortly following the independence of the Third Philippine Republic, Feleo was assassinated by the administration of Manuel Roxas, beginning the Hukbalahap Rebellion against the republic. After negotiations between the two sides failed, the Hukbalahap forces began to dwindle. The rebellion was finally put down in 1954 and the guerilla leader Luis Taruc was forced to surrender. The Communist Party was once again outlawed and continued repression caused their movement to falter during the 1960s. This led to the First Great Rectification Movement, in which the Nationalist Youth (KM) led by Jose Maria Sison began to criticize the old Communist Party for its failures and initiated a process intended to revitalize the communist movement.

With the election of the right-wing Ferdinand Marcos as President of the Philippines in 1965 and the advent of the Cultural Revolution in 1966, the Nationalist Youth became increasingly inspired by Maoism and in 1967 were expelled from the Communist Party for their critical line, which advocated for a protracted people's war against the Republic of the Philippines. This expulsion caused a further fragmentation of the communist movement, with some young Marxist-Leninists remaining loyal to the party's old guard and splitting from the KM to form the Free Union of Filipino Youth (MPKP). But the majority of those that left the KM were themselves Maoists, seeking to enhance their political autonomy rather than submit to Sison's centralized authoritarian structure, going on to establish the Federation of Democratic Youth (SDK) in January 1968. Inspired by the Cultural Revolution and the concept of the mass line, the SDK developed an anarchist tendency in their program. Meanwhile, the Nationalist Youth reacted to their expulsion by establishing a new Communist Party, which launched a renewed rebellion against the Republic of the Philippines.

In 1970, the SDK aligned itself once again with the KM, which initiated a purge of the SDK leadership and restructured the group along more tightly organized lines, renaming it to the "Democratic Federation of Youth". The anarchist tendencies within the SDK were subsequently pushed to the fringes of the organization, causing an explicitly anarchist group led by Jerry Araos to form, known as the Federation of Democratic Youth - Mendiola (SDKM). The SDKM adopted the black flag as its symbol and began to form the front-lines at protests, earning the nickname "gunpowder brains" due to their inclination towards violence, use of explosives and construction of pillboxes.

The SDKM played a prominent role during the First Quarter Storm; during the battle on Mendiola Street a fire truck being used to blast protestors with water was commandeered by the SDKM, who used it as a battering ram against the gates of Malacañang Palace. When a number of explosions forced the retreat of protestors away from the palace, they constructed barricades along the bridge. When the SDK leader Sixto Carlos called on the SDKM for help, members of the SDKM posted themselves at every barricade. Protestors battled with the police on the bridge for several hours, but the barricades eventually fell and the protestors were again forced to retreat. In February 1971, a student uprising at the University of the Philippines Diliman led to the establishment of the Diliman Commune. Here too, members of the SDKM played a prominent role at the barricades, but according to Araos, the barricades only fell due to an order from the Communist Party to abandon them. The SDKM was eventually brought back into alignment with the SDK, now engaged in community service work and the organization of small protests. The two eventually merged entirely, with Jerry Araos being elected vice-chair of the newly united SDK. However, due to these waves of protests, on September 23, 1972, Marcos proclaimed martial law in the Philippines, marking the beginning of an era of military dictatorship. Many of the existing communist organizations, including the SDK, were driven underground in the repression and were eventually dissolved by 1975.

Despite playing a prominent role in the resistance to the Marcos dictatorship, the communist's opposition to the People Power Revolution that overthrew Marcos ultimately caused their movement to be largely sidelined during the Fifth Republic of the Philippines. The fallout from this decision, combined with the Revolutions of 1989 and the beginning of the Second Great Rectification Movement in 1992, led to further splits within the Communist Party, which fragmented into several competing factions. This fragmentation of the authoritarian left gave way for other forms of radical leftism to begin emerging towards the end of the 20th century.

=== Resurgence of the anarchist movement ===
In the 1970s, the Filipino anarchist movement began to reemerge as part of the nascent punk subculture in the archipelago, bringing with it a strong philosophy of anti-authoritarianism. Under the dictatorship, punk music was brought to the country by returning members of the diaspora, and was broadcast illegally throughout Manila, giving rise to the Pinoy punk movement. Punk music gave an expression to youth dissatisfaction with conservative society and began to develop an explicitly political nature during the 1980s, with many punks explicitly espousing anarchist ideas.

The fragmentation of the Communist Party in the wake of the People Power Revolution led to a further surge of anarchist activity in the archipelago. In one account, a cadre cell in the Communist Party was converted to anarchism. One of the tendencies that emerged from the split was popular democracy, which proposed that proper setting for democratic initiatives was in civil society, rather than in the state. The "popular democrats" were mostly divided between minarchists, who engaged in electoralism, and anarchists, who engaged in community organizing. In the Kasarinlan journal, the former Communist Party member Isagani Serrano published the article Reimagining Philippine Revolution, in which he advocated for popular democracy and criticized the party's ideology, proposing an anti-statist social revolution.

The anarchist movement continued to attract people throughout the 1990s, particularly after the 1999 Seattle WTO protests brought anarchism into mainstream discourse. One group that formed around this time was the Metro Manila Anarchist Confederation (MMAC), which sought to coordinate individuals and collectives to take action, rather than forming a political party. Other organized anarchist groups also began to form, with a number of collectives coming together to establish the Anti-Capitalist Convergence Philippines, in order to organize protests against the International Monetary Fund and the World Bank. In 2001, Filipinos were further drawn to anarchism during the Second EDSA Revolution against the government of Joseph Estrada, during which anarchists distributed a leaflet titled Organize Without Leaders!, contrasting themselves with other opposition groups that sought to achieve political power. After Gloria Macapagal Arroyo took power, many of the country's leftists became disillusioned with the EDSA revolutions, which they considered had only amounted to regime change. This disillusionment accelerated following the aborted EDSA III, which was swiftly repressed and resulted in the arrest of opposition leaders, but had raised public awareness of the possibilities of self-organization. Some Communist Party members have even begun to call for systemic change, rather than their usual line of regime change.

In the wake of these revolutions, contemporary Filipino anarchists such as Bas Umali began to call for the dismantling of the Philippine nation-state and the establishment of a decentralized "archipelagic confederation" in its place. Anarchist modes of problem-solving, grounded in precolonial bayanihan and supported by, among others, Christian subsidiarity, have also emerged back into the mainstream as an alternative to disempowered dependence. An example of this is the setting up of community pantries during the COVID-19 pandemic and their persistence amid a backdrop of political-economic hostility. As of 2009 there were various anarchist groups in the Philippines, some examples are the regional Davao Anarchists Resistance Movement (DARM), anarcha-feminist organization Liberate the Clit Kolektiv (LiCK), as well as publishers Dumpling Press, Animal Liberation organization Youth Collective for Animal Liberation (YCAL) and the Local Anarchist Network (LAN), self-described as "a loose association of anarchists" of different tendencies.

== Organizations ==
- Local Autonomous Network (LAN)
- Bandilang Itim
- Etniko Bandido Workshop

== See also ==
- List of anarchist movements by region
- Anarchism in China
- Anarchism in Indonesia
- Anarchism in Malaysia
- Anarchism in Spain
- Maṇḍala
