= Katipunan ng mga Anak-Pawis sa Pilipinas =

Trade union in the Philippines

Proletarian Labor Congress of the Philippines
- Katipunan ng mga Anak-Pawis sa Pilipinas
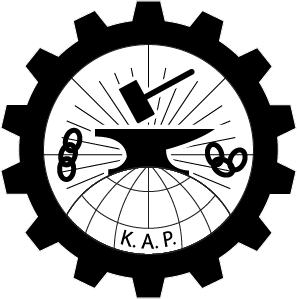
- Predecessor: Congreso Obrero de Filipinas
- Successor: PKP-1930
- Founded: 1929
- Founder: Crisanto Evangelista
- Location: Insular Government of the Philippine Islands

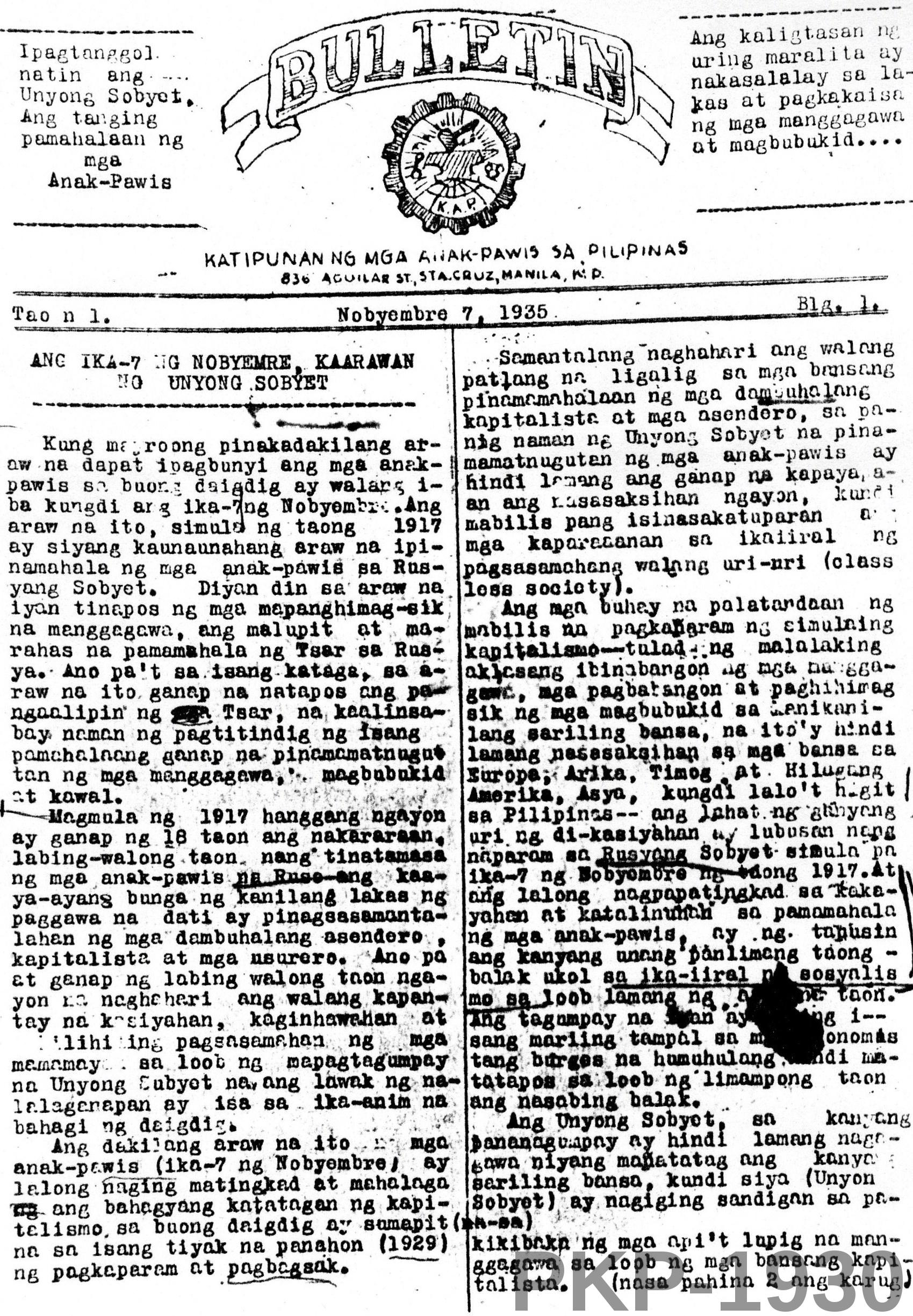
November 7, 1935 issue of the Katipunan ng mga Anak-Pawis sa Pilipinas' bulletin

The Katipunan ng mga Anak-Pawis sa Pilipinas (KAP) (English: Proletarian Labor Congress of the Philippines) was the third trade union federation in the Philippines. It was formed in 1929 after an antagonistic national convention of the Congreso Obrero de Filipinas (COF, "Philippine Labor Congress") where election results were manipulated, causing Crisanto Evangelista and his faction to split from the COF. In 1930, the KAP changed its name to Partido Komunista ng Pilipinas after it initiated the formation of a "mass political party" and questions arose regarding its name.

Aside from Evangelista, other leaders of the KAP included Guillermo Capadocia, Manuel R. Joven, Mariano P. Balgos, and Pedro G. Castro. Evidently, the KAP persisted in some form or another after the establishment of the Partido Komunista ng Pilipinas. Felixberto Olalia is mentioned as its Secretary-General in 1939.

== See also ==
- Anakpawis
- Partido Obrero de Filipinas
- Unión Obrera Democrática Filipina
