= CofS =

CofS may refer to:

- Chief of Staff
- Church of Scientology
- Church of Scotland
- COFS syndrome, a rare and fatal autosomal recessive neurodegenerative disorder

== See also ==
- COF (disambiguation)
- CoFSM or Flying Spaghetti Monster
