= Pan-Pacific Trade Union Secretariat =

Pro-Soviet organization

Chinese name
- Traditional Chinese: 太平洋勞動會議秘書處
- Simplified Chinese: 太平洋劳动会议秘书处
Transcriptions

Alternative Chinese name
- Traditional Chinese: 太平洋職工秘書處
- Simplified Chinese: 太平洋职工秘书处
Transcriptions

Japanese name
- Kanji: 太平洋労働組合書記局

Russian name
- Russian: Тихоокеанского секретариата профсоюзов

English name
- English: Pan-Pacific Trade Union Secretariat

French name
- French: Secrétariat Syndical Pan-Pacifique

The Pan-Pacific Trade Union Secretariat (PPTUS) was a regional subdivision of the Red International of Labor Unions (RILU, commonly known as the Profintern), the trade union organization associated with the Communist International. Established in Hankou, China, in May 1927, the PPTUS attempted to coordinate communist activity in the organized labor movement of China and the Pacific basin, including particularly Japan, Korea, Indonesia, the Philippines, Australia, and the United States.

== Organizational history ==
=== Establishment ===
The Pan-Pacific Trade Union Secretariat (PPTUS) was established as the Asian and Pacific branch of the Red International of Trade Unions (RILU or Profintern), to coordinate radical trade union activities in China and the countries Pacific basin, which shared oceanic-based trade relations. The idea for a Pan-Pacific conference originated with Communists in the Australian trade union movement, who sought to emulate a previous conference of Pacific seamen and dock workers which had been held in Canton in June 1924.

A convention call was issued for a gathering to be held in Sydney, Australia on July 1, 1926, at under the auspices of the communist-led New South Wales Trades and Labour Council, but the Nationalist government of Stanley Bruce denied travel visas to the assembly's scheduled participants and the meeting was therefore postponed and moved to another location.

A second effort at organization would not follow until the following year, with the Profintern initially seeking a gathering at Canton In conjunction with May Day of 1927. Rapidly changing political events in China in the spring of 1927 had made both the time and the place impossible, however, and the decision was made to move to the safer ground of Hankou, immediately following the closure of the 5th National Congress of the Chinese Communist Party. Hankou was selected owing to its place at the center of the Wuhan government of the Kuomintang, a revolutionary and left-wing nationalist organization which was at the time briefly in alliance with the international Communist movement.

The convention opened on May 20, 1927, and was attended to delegates from 8 nations — China, the Soviet Union, Japan, Indonesia, Korea, France, the United States, and Great Britain. Planned delegates from India and Australia ran afoul of their various departments of state, while Philippine delegates decided against attending due to the turbulent situation in China, marked by mass arrests and executions of Communists and trade unionists in Canton. A single delegate from Mexico arrived late. The opening of the convention was the cause of a mass one day strike in Wuhan, with an estimated 100,000 workers participating in a mass demonstration.

The keynote address at the founding conference of the PPTUS was delivered by Profintern chief Solomon Lozovsky. The gathering determined to establish permanent headquarters of the new organization in the Chinese industrial city of Shanghai.

=== Personnel and constituent organizations ===
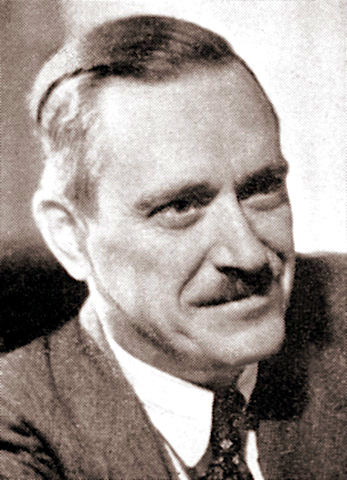
First Secretary of the PPTUS was Earl Browder, who held the position from 1927 to 1929.

The First Secretary of the PPTUS was American CPUSA member Earl Browder, later to become General Secretary of that organization. Other members of the inaugural secretariat of the PPTUS included Jack Ryan of Australian, Crisanto Evangelista from the Philippines, Su Chao-jen of China, and K. Kawasaki of Japan.

Editor of the group's English-language official organ was another American, Harrison George.

The PPTUC counted among its members eleven radical trade union organizations. These were the Australian Council of Trade Unions, the All-China Federation of Trade Unions, the Indonesian Labor Federation, the Japanese Trade Union Council, the National Minority Movement (Great Britain), the Confédération Générale du Travail Unitaire (France), the Korean Workers and Peasants Federation, the Philippine Labor Congress, the National Confederation of Farm Laborers and Tenants of the Philippines, the All-Union Central Council of Trade Unions (USSR), and the Trade Union Educational League (USA).

Member organizations endorsed a seven-point platform which pledged the PPTUS to carry on a joint struggle against war between the military powers of the Pacific, to defend the Chinese Communist Revolution, to aid oppressed nations of the region to liberate themselves from imperial powers, to fight against racial and national barriers, joint action, and a unified world trade union movement through a single Trade Union International.

=== Development ===
While the headquarters of the PPTUS was nominally located in Shanghai, in actuality the "home office" of the organization (as its leading functionaries referred to it) was Moscow — headquarters city of the Comintern and Profintern and location of the various World Congresses and Enlarged Plenums of these organizations. It was from there whence financial resources flowed and where organizational decisions were debated and determined, with representatives of the various constituent Communist and trade unions living permanently in Moscow's Hotel Lux.

Historian E. H. Carr counts two early successes of the Pan-Pacific Trade Union Secretariat: the adhesion of the 70,000 member Philippine national trade union congress in June 1927 and the Australian Council of Trade Unions (ACTU), claiming 500,000 members, in August of that same year. However, the Australian Workers' Union (AWU), one of Australia's largest unions, withdrew from the ACTU in 1928 over its affiliation with the PPTUS, with AWU secretary Ted Grayndler describing the PPTUS as a Communist front whose opposition to racial discrimination would endanger the White Australia policy.

Individuals associated with the Pan-Pacific Trade Union Secretariat were subjected to repression by the various national governments. The Chinese labor movement was effectively smashed in various cities throughout the second half of 1927, culminating with the crushing of the Canton rising of December 1927. In March and April 1928 a wave of arrests were conducted in Japan, leading to the imprisonment of 638 individuals, with 218 sentenced to long terms of imprisonment and hundreds of others held in jail for more than 18 months without hearing or trial.

The situation faced by radical trade unionists in China was reportedly even more draconian, with a report by Deng Zhongxia submitted to the PPTUS in 1928 asserting that nearly 38,000 had been killed in China — including 25,000 killed in fighting various government and paramilitary forces and 13,000 who suffered execution. By August 1930 total membership in semi-underground red trade unions in the whole of China controlled by the Kuomintang is said to have been reduced by mass killings and attrition to just 49,826 members.

=== Second Conference ===
The second international conference of the Pan-Pacific Secretariat was convened in the Soviet Pacific port city of Vladivostok, Siberia on August 1, 1929. By this time it was already clear that the PPTUS had failed as an instrument for amplifying labor radicalism, with Solomon Lozovsky noting that "extremely unfavorable conditions" had rendered the organization unable to meet openly in any capitalist country in the region. A total of 25 voting delegates and 17 observers were able to make it to Vladivostok for the opening of the assembly, with many Asian delegates blocked from attendance by government restrictions.

Grand designs for a new labor international were deemphasized in favor of practical politics in defense of the Russian Revolution against imperialist intervention. The conference adopted a program of activity which called for the organization of a mass campaign at the shop level to "explain the imperialist policy against the Soviet Union" and to make use of mass demonstrations and enlist the labor press in this campaign. It also called for the establishment of special committees of transport workers and workers in munitions plants to obstruct production of war materiel for use in any future conflict against the USSR.

E.H. Carr notes that the only record of the second and final conference appears in a pessimistic account by Lozovsky in the Comintern magazine Kommunisticheskii Internatsional, with the memoir of one participant published a quarter century later indicating that the gathering was moved to Shanghai during the proceedings.

=== Official organ ===
The official organ of the Secretariat was initially named the Pan-Pacific Worker, a monthly magazine. Only two issues of the English-language publication were able to be published in Hankou before the publication was shut down by the Kuomintang government following a violent split between the Chinese nationalist movement and its temporary Communist allies. Plans were made to move production of the periodical to Australia, but this scheme fell through, and in December 1927 the editorial office was moved to Shanghai, where underground production continued throughout 1928.

Production of the journal in Nationalist China was difficult and dangerous. In May 1928 PPTUS chief Earl Browder and his assistant, the Latvian-American Communist Karlis Janson, reported to Moscow that earlier that year one Shanghai print shop suspected of having printed a radical leaflet had its entire staff of 17 workers taken out and summarily shot. The effect of the terror had been immediate, with the PPTUS unable to obtain printed materials from their own clandestine printing shop for three months. Browder's own time in Shanghai was correspondingly short, lasting from February until June 1928, after which he departed for the "Home Office" in Moscow and thereafter to the United States.

Editor of the publication was Harrison George. Secretary of the Pan-Pacific Secretariat Earl Browder sought to move George and the editorial office of the magazine from Shanghai to San Francisco in February 1929 and consulted with the Comintern to this end, with the move following shortly thereafter. An English-language Australian edition was also produced in that country under the auspices of the PPTUS and the Australian Council of Trade Unions from April 1928 until January 1932. The first editor of this publication seems to have been Australian Communist and trade union activist Jack Ryan. The Australian edition was briefly imported into India for distribution there until it was banned by colonial postal authorities in October 1929.

The English-language publication's name changed almost as often as its editorial office relocated, taking on the new name Far Eastern Monthly in April 1928 before becoming assuming its ultimate name, Pacific Monthly, in San Francisco in April 1929.

In addition to the English-language magazine, the 2nd conference of the Pan-Pacific Trade Union Secretariat, held in Vladivostok in August 1929, determined to establish a Vladivostok Bureau of the PPTUS which would launch monthly editions of the Pan-Pacific Worker in Chinese, Japanese, and Korean. The American center of the PPTUS also took over the publication of the 32-page Japanese biweekly Taiheiyo Rodosha from early 1932.

=== Demise and legacy ===
The establishment of the PPTUS was echoed by the Profintern in May 1929 with its establishment in Montevideo, Argentina of the Latin American Trade Union Confederation for the coordination of activity of left wing trade union activists and labor unions in Central and South America.

In practical terms little was accomplished by the PPTUS outside of the adoption of ephemeral formal resolutions accompanied by the occasional ineffectual demonstration, however.

== Plenary conferences ==
| Conference | Location | Date | Notes and references |
|---|---|---|---|
| Founding Conference | Hankou, China | May 20-??, 1927 | Attended by representatives of 11 labor organizations. |
| 2nd Plenary Conference | Vladivostok, USSR | Aug. 1-??, 1929 | Attended by 25 voting delegates and 17 observers. |

== See also ==
- Jakob Rudnik (also known as Hilaire Noulens) - secretary of PPTUS
- Far Eastern Bureau of the Comintern
- Communist University of the Toilers of the East

== Archival holdings ==
- Russian State Archive of Social and Political History (RGASPI), Moscow: fond 534, Profintern Archive, opis 4, Pan-Pacific Trade Union Secretariat.
