= Unión de Impresores de Filipinas =

Filipina trade union

Printers' Union of the Philippines
- Unión de Impresores de Filipinas
- Predecessor: Unión Obrera Democrática
- Successor: Congreso Obrero de Filipinas
- Founded: 1901/1902 (as a labor union); 1906 (as a national trade union center/confederation); Santa Cruz, Manila, Philippine Islands
- Location: Philippines
- Key people: Hermenegildo Cruz; Felipe Mendoza; Crisanto Evangelista; Ciriaco Cruz

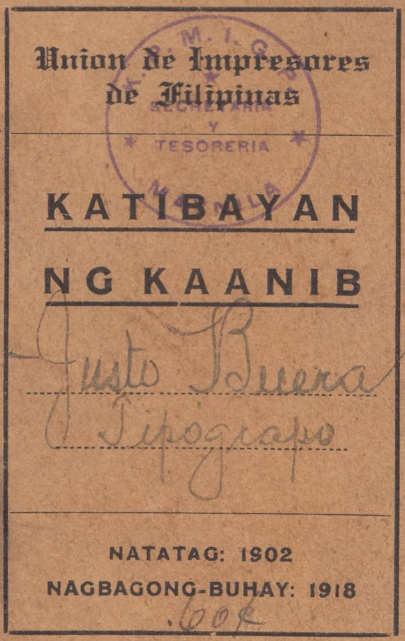
A Certificate of Membership (Katibayan ng Kaanib) of Union de Impresores de Filipinas circa 1918

The Unión de Impresores de Filipinas (UIF, English: Printers' Union of the Philippines) was one of the first national trade union centers in the Philippines, along with the Unión Obrera Democrática Filipina. Established in 1906, it was a national union of all workers in the printing trade intended to consolidate them into a single confederation.

== History ==
The first labor union in the Philippines called Union de Impresores (UI) was first established in June 1901 by a group of printers. Following the establishment of other similar unions within the printing business after the UI, the UI and these other unions were united as a single group and formed the Union de Impresores de Filipinas (UIF) on either December 30, 1901 or in January 1902 headed by Hermenegildo Cruz.

The UIF was later renamed to Union de Litografos y Impresores de Filipinas (ULIF) and eventually to Unión Democrática de Litógrafos, Impresores, Encuadernadores y Otros Obreros (in Spanish, lit. ''Democratic Union of Lithographers, Printers, Bookbinders and Other Workers'') with Isabelo de los Reyes joining. Not long after its founding, the members reorganized themselves into Unión Obrera Democrática (later Unión Obrera Democrática Filipina) as a trade union federation, with de los Reyes as its first president.

Hermenegildo Cruz is credited with conceiving the idea for a national trade union center as an ultimate solution to the problems labor leaders were encountering in the consolidation of its members. Following the disintegration of the Unión Obrera Democrática Filipina, in 1906, such a union for the printing trade called Unión de Impresores de Filipinas was re-established during a meeting held in Santa Cruz, Manila, this time as a confederation. Felipe Mendoza, a lithographer and Cruz's right-hand man, was elected president. Crisanto Evangelista, a typesetter, was Secretary-general; this was the first occasion Evagelista was associated with the labor movement as a leader. Ciriaco Cruz was indicated as an official, however his position is not mentioned in the records.

In 1918, the UIF had an election and reshuffling of officers. Later on, the UIF became dormant and was quietly dissolved. The UIF was historically considered as a continuation of the Unión Obrera Democrática Filipina.

== See also ==
- Congreso Obrero de Filipinas
- Partido Obrero de Filipinas
- Unión Obrera Democrática Filipina
