= MLPP =

MLPP may refer to:

- Multilevel precedence and preemption
- Marxist–Leninist Party of the Philippines
