= RHB =

RHB may refer to:

- RHB Bank, a Malaysian bank
- Rebolusyonaryong Hukbong Bayan, the armed wing of the Marxist–Leninist Party of the Philippines
- Rhaetian Railway, a Swiss transport company
- Rorschach–Heiden railway, a mountain railway in eastern Switzerland
- Right hand bat, see Batting (cricket)
