= Guillermo Capadocia =

Filipino politician and communist labor leader

- Born: c. 1909; Negros Oriental, Philippines
- Died: September 28, 1951 (aged 41–42); San Remigio, Antique, Philippines
- Occupation: Politician

Guillermo Capadocia (1909 – September 28, 1951) was a Filipino communist politician and labour leader. He was a prominent leader of the Communist Party in the Philippines (PKP) and different labour movements. During the last one and a half years of his life he was a regional guerrilla commander of the Hukbalahap.

== Early life ==
Capadocia was born in Negros Oriental, the son of a poor labourer. Capadocia himself survived through various employments, such as working as a chef and waiter. He became active in trade unions in the 1920s. Despite lacking a formal education, Capadocia became highly literate and gained a deep knowledge of Marxist-Leninist thought.

== Prominence in the PKP ==
When the Partido Komunista ng Pilipinas (Communist Party in the Philippines or PKP) was founded, Capadocia was included in its first Central Committee. In the labour movement, Capadocia was a leading figure in the Katipunan ng mga Anak-Pawis sa Pilipinas (KAP). Capadocia became the general secretary of the Communist Party in 1938, in the unification process with the Socialist Party. In the same year, Capadocia became the executive secretary of the Collective Labor Movement.

On January 25, 1942, Capadocia, Pedro Abad Santos, and Crisanto Evangelista were arrested by the Japanese forces. He was imprisoned at Fort Santiago. He was released after some years.

When the Congress of Labor Organizations was formed in July 1945, Capadocia was included in its leadership. Capadocia became the vice president of CLO.

== Later years and death ==
When the Hukbalahap rebellion broke out in 1949, Capadocia stayed overground and continued to work as a Congress of Labor Organizations leader. However, in late 1949 he went underground to lead the Huks on the island of Panay. The national government offered a $50,000 reward for him. Capadocia and several of his fighters were killed by an Army task force, led by Col. Alfredo Ramos, in an attack on their hide-out in the mountains of San Remigio, Antique, on September 28, 1951.
