= Collective Labor Movement =

Trade union centre in the Philippines

The Collective Labor Movement (abbreviated CLM) was a trade union centre in the Philippines. The CLM was founded in 1938 (87 years ago) and consisted of 76 radical and liberal trade unions. It represented a regroupment of the leftist sectors of the Filipino trade union movement. CLM was the largest labour organization in the country in the years in the run-up to the Second World War.

Shortly after the May Day celebrations of 1938, 25 trade union leaders met in Manila and agreed to form the CLM as a united organization. The founding meeting of the CLM was held on June 26, 1938. Three-thousand workers participated in the conference. Represented unions included Katipunan ng mga Anak-Pawis sa Pilipinas, Katipunang Pambansa ng mga Magbubukid sa Pilipinas, Federacion Obrera de Filipinas, Aguman Ding Maldang Tagapagobra, the National Labor Union, National Employment Council, National Labor League, Philippine Chinese Labor Federation, and Federacion Obrera de Industria Tabaquera de Filipinas. The movement was inspired by the US Congress of Industrial Organizations. The platform of the CLM advocated immediate and full independence of the Philippines, exposure of racketeering union officials, support of the social justice program of the Filipino government.

Jose M. Nava was elected president of the CLM at its founding meeting, whilst Guillermo Capadocia became the executive secretary. Other presidium members were Isabelo Tejada, Pedro Abad Santos, Mateo del Castillo, Juan Feleo, Luis Taruc, Pedro G. Castro, Antonio Paguia, Manuel Palacios, Manuel R. Joven, Mariano Ponce, Florentino Tecson, Mariano P. Balgos, Rufo Covacha, Luis Pilapil, and Luis Adriano.

Soon after the foundation of the CLM, right-wing trade union leaders began to condemn the organization as controlled by communists. In response to the founding of the CLM, the anti-communist trade unionists organized a convention in August 1938.
