= Crisanto Evangelista =

Filipino communist politician and labor leader

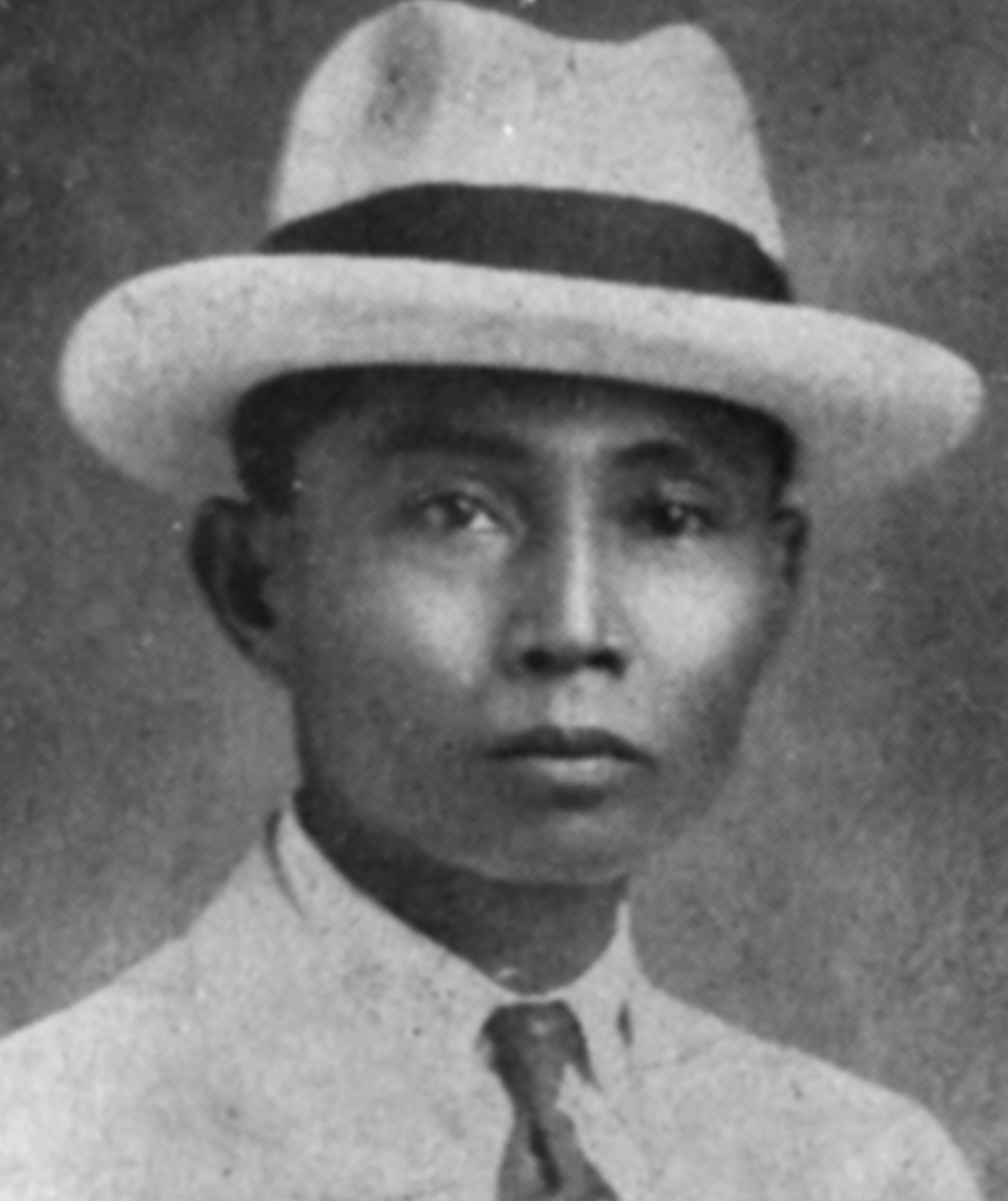
- Evangelista c. 1929

Chairman of the Communist Party of the Philippines
- In office 31 October 1938 – 25 January 1942
- Vice-Chairman: Pedro Abad Santos
- Preceded by: Office established
- Succeeded by: Office abolished (Title later held by Felicisimo Macapagal)

General Secretary of the Communist Party of the Philippine Islands
- In office 26 August 1930 – 12 March 1933
- Preceded by: Office established
- Succeeded by: Emilio Maclang

Personal details
- Born: November 1, 1888 Meycauayan, Bulacan, Captaincy General of the Philippines
- Died: June 2, 1942 (aged 53) Commonwealth of the Philippines
- Cause of death: Execution
- Party: Partido Komunista ng Pilipinas-1930 (1930–1942); Partido Obrero de Filipinas (1924–1930); Nacionalista (until 1924)

Crisanto Abaño Evangelista (November 1, 1888 – June 2, 1942) was a Filipino communist politician and labor leader of the first half of the 20th century. He is credited as being one of the founders of the Partido Komunista ng Pilipinas. Evangelista was also an influential head of the Congreso Obrero de Filipinas, at the time the foremost and largest trade federation in the Philippines, having served as secretary for multiple years. He also headed the Union de Impresores de Filipinas as its Secretary-General. Prior to forming the PKP, Evangelista was a member of the Partido Obrero de Filipinas, a Filipino workers' party with increasingly radical leanings. Evangelista was eventually captured by the Japanese during the Second World War and executed.

== Biography ==
On May Day 1913, together with Hermenegildo Cruz, he had attempted to guarantee basic workers' rights and unify the trade unions in the country.

After defecting from the Nacionalista Party with its left wing allies, he became one of the founders and early leaders of the increasingly Marxist Partido Obrero de Filipinas, which became the Progressive Workers Party. Around it, he formed a new trade union federation, one that was more radical in its goals.

Evangelista was one of five members of the inaugural executive committee of the Pan-Pacific Trade Union Secretariat, established in 1927 as a Pacific regional subdivision of the Red International of Labor Unions (RILU, commonly known as the Profintern). He was instrumental in affiliating the Philippine labor federation, the Congreso Obrero de Filipinas (COF) with that organization on June 30 of that same year.

On November 7, 1930, the 13th anniversary of the October Revolution, Evangelista reformed his group as the Partido Komunista ng Pilipinas and subsequently led it briefly until it was banned on October 26, 1932, by the Supreme Court of the Philippines. Jailed towards the end of the decade, Evangelista was involved in informal talks with President Manuel L. Quezon, negotiating a social peace.

He was arrested by invading Imperial Japanese Army troops along with Pedro Abad Santos and Guillermo Capadocia on January 25, 1942, and executed on June 2, 1942, after an attempt to use him as a bargaining tool in contacts with the Hukbalahap.
