= Harrison George =

American communist and unionist (1888–1960s)

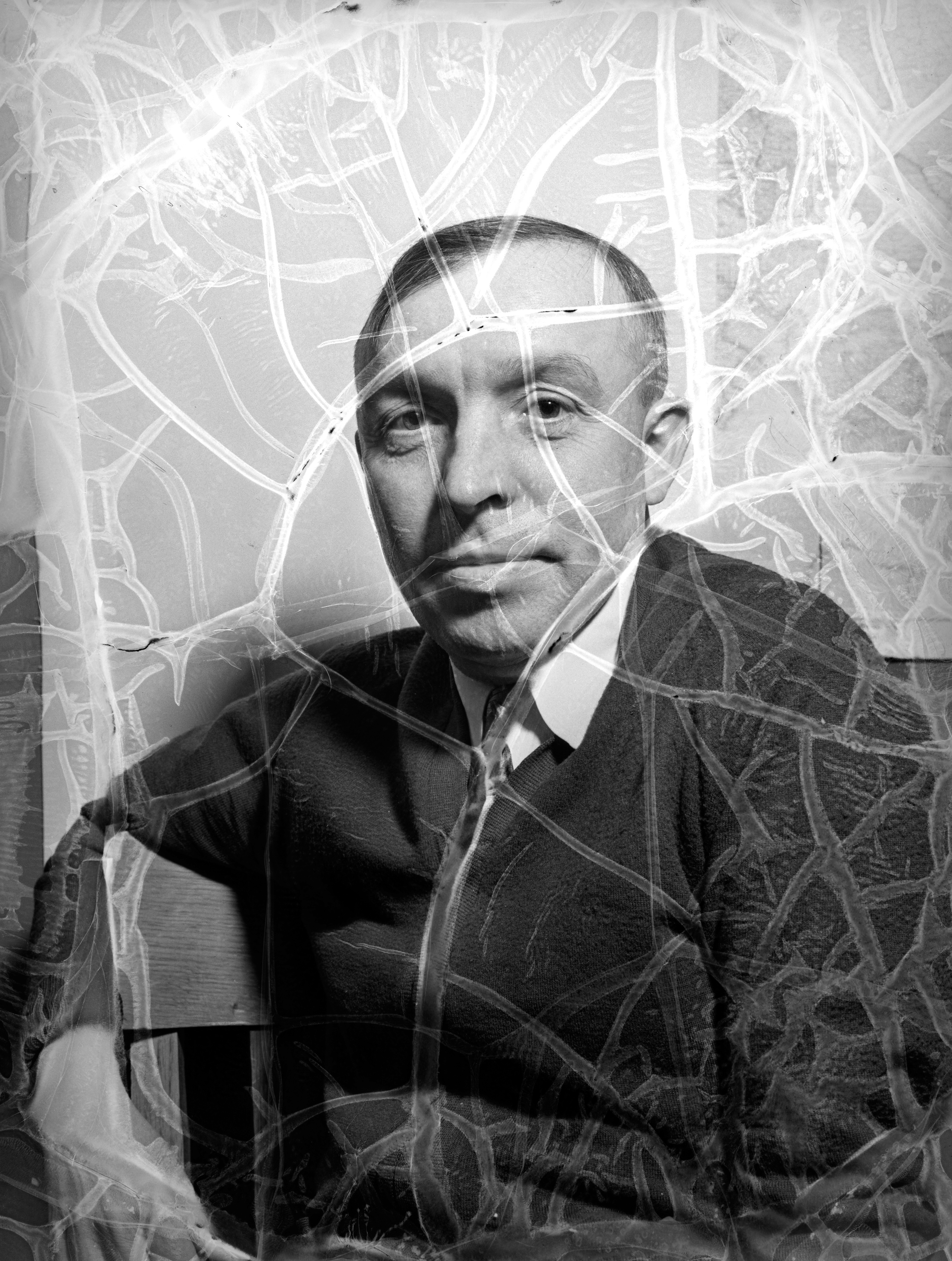
George c. 1937

Harrison George (June 27, 1888 – c. 1960s) was a senior functionary in the Communist Party USA (CPUSA). He is best remembered as editor of the official organ of the Pan-Pacific Trade Union Secretariat (PPTUS), as well as the Communist Party's West Coast newspaper, People's World.

== Career ==
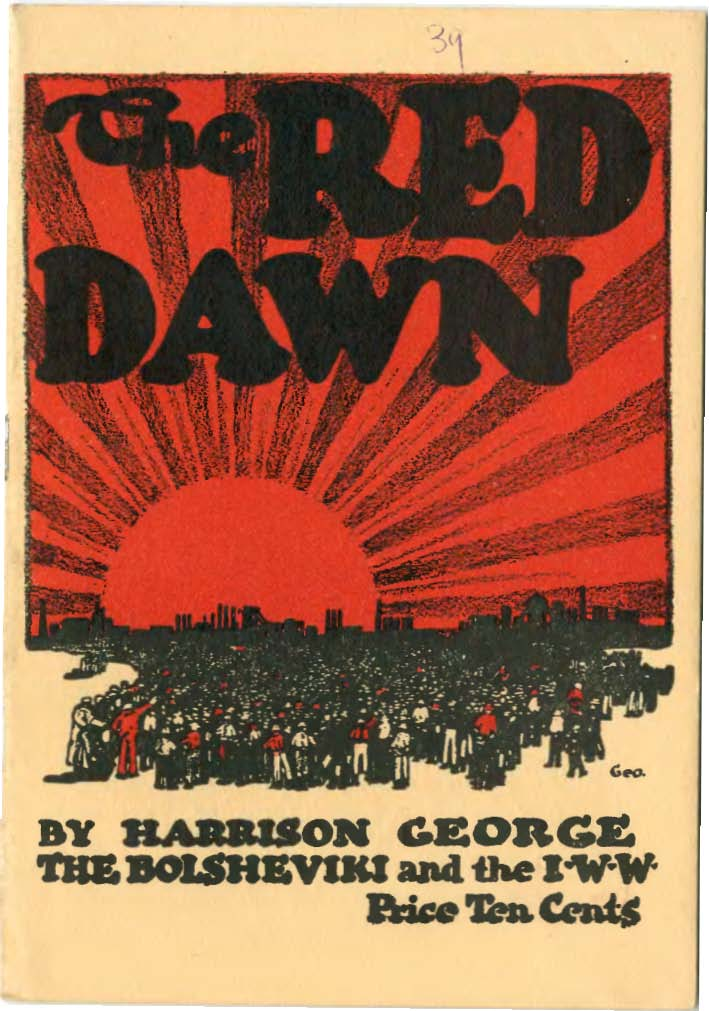
Cover of The Red Dawn, George's 1918 pamphlet on the Russian Revolution

George joined the Socialist Party of America in 1910, but was expelled with the party's left wing in 1913. He joined the Industrial Workers of the World the following year, organizing the 1916 Mesabi Range miners' strike. He was arrested for anti-war activities in 1917, serving two terms at Leavenworth Penitentiary from 1918 to 1920 and 1921 to 1923. In 1919, while in prison, he wrote to John Reed to apply for membership in the Communist Party.

George in the Daily Worker, January 11, 1930

George began writing for the Daily Worker as early as January 13, 1924, the paper's debut issue. In 1937, he was named editor-in-chief of People's World. In 1946, he was expelled from the party for protesting the expulsion of longtime colleague Vern Smith on charges of ultra-leftism. George was later denounced as a "Trotskyist". He was called to testify before the House Un-American Activities Committee in 1953, but refused to answer questions.

=== Profintern ===
The Pan-Pacific Trade Union Secretariat (PPTUS) was established by the Red International of Labor Unions (Profintern) in 1927, with Earl Browder as its General Secretary. Documents from the Comintern Archive in Moscow reveal the relationship between Browder and George, who at the time was an Industrial Workers of the World leader and communist mole in the Wobblies. The minutes of a PPTUS meeting were signed by George and Tsutomu Yano, who would later recruit people for the Richard Sorge spy ring in Japan.

=== Espionage ===
Intercepted Soviet intelligence traffic is alleged to reveal a covert relationship George had as a cutout transmitting information from James Walter Miller, who worked in the U.S. Post Office's Office of Censorship to the San Francisco KGB.

Harrison's role receives mention in the memoir of Whittaker Chambers:

The "Old Man" (Isaac Folkoff) is a California businessman and lifelong Communist of Russian birth, very active in party affairs on the West Coast. At the time I met him, he was also connected with my old comrade from the Daily Worker, Harrison George, who was then heading the West Coast office of the Pan-Pacific Trade Union Secretariat, an international Communist organization, which among other activities, was running couriers on the ships to Australia, Japan and Asiatic mainland ports.

== Personal life ==
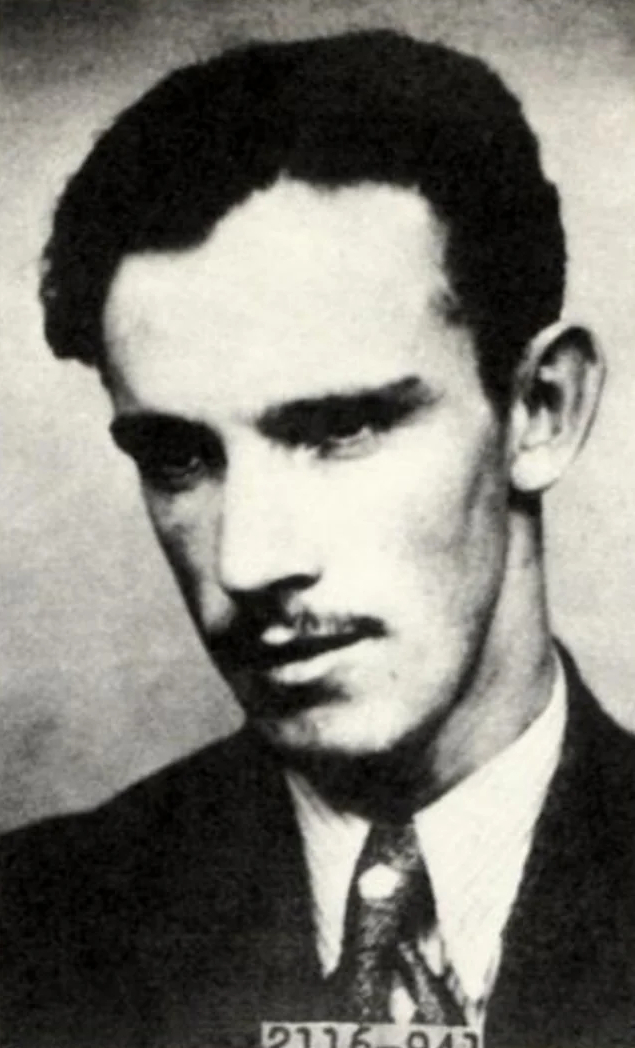
George's son Victor Allen Barron, 1935

George married a woman named Edna, with whom they had a son, Victor Allen. Edna later divorced George and married one Cliff Barron, who adopted Victor. Edna eventually divorced Barron and married one Ike Hill. According to Chambers, Earl Browder was George's brother-in-law.

Victor Allen Barron was a Communist activist in his own right, sent by the Comintern to Brazil in 1935 to help the Brazilian Communist Party install a radio station for direct communication with Moscow. He took part in the 1935 Brazilian communist uprising, serving as personal driver to Luís Carlos Prestes. In a 2025 article, Prestes's daughter Anita Leocádia Prestes accused Argentinian Communist Rodolfo Ghioldi of betraying Barron and her father to the police, leading to their arrests. Rio de Janeiro police chief Filinto Müller claimed that it was Barron who betrayed Prestes, and after Barron fell from the window of the police station to his death it was ruled a suicide. George maintained that his son was murdered, and accused U.S. Ambassador to Brazil Hugh S. Gibson of collaboration with Brazilian authorities in preventing Barron's release.

== Works ==
=== Pamphlets ===
- The I. W. W. Trial. Chicago: Industrial Workers of the World, 1918.
- The Red Dawn. Chicago: Industrial Workers of the World, 1918.
- Chicago Race Riots. Chicago: Great Western Publishing Company, 1919.

=== Articles ===
- "The Mesaba Iron Range." International Socialist Review, vol. 17, no. 6 (December 1916), pp. 329–332.
- "Victory on the Mesaba Range." International Socialist Review, vol. 17, no. 7 (January 1917), pp. 429–431.
- "Hitting the Trail in the Lumber Camps." International Socialist Review, vol. 17, no. 8 (February 1917), pp. 455–457.
- "They Killed My Son." New Masses, vol. 18, no. 13 (March 24, 1936), pp. 15–16.
- "I Accuse!" (Part 1) Sunday Worker, vol. 1, no. 14 (April 12, 1936), pp. 1, 4.
- "I Accuse!" (Part 2) Sunday Worker, vol. 1, no. 14 (April 19, 1936), p. 4.
