= COF =

COF may refer to:

- Canadian Orienteering Federation, governing body of orienteering in Canada
- Capital One Financial (NYSE: COF), a United States bank
- Circle of fifths, a concept in music theory
- Coefficient of friction, the ratio of the force of friction between two bodies and the force pressing them together
- Cofactor (linear algebra), in linear algebra, cof(A) refers to the sum of the matrix A's
- Congreso Obrero de Filipinas, in the Philippines
- Cofidis (cycling team), French cycling team
- Council of the Federation, Canadian organization
- Covalent organic framework, two-dimensional and three-dimensional organic solids with extended structures
- Cradle Of Filth, an English extreme metal band
- Patrick Space Force Base (IATA: COF), a United States Space Force Base in Florida
