= Solomon Lozovsky =

Soviet revolutionary (1878–1952)

Solomon Lozovsky Соломон Лозовский
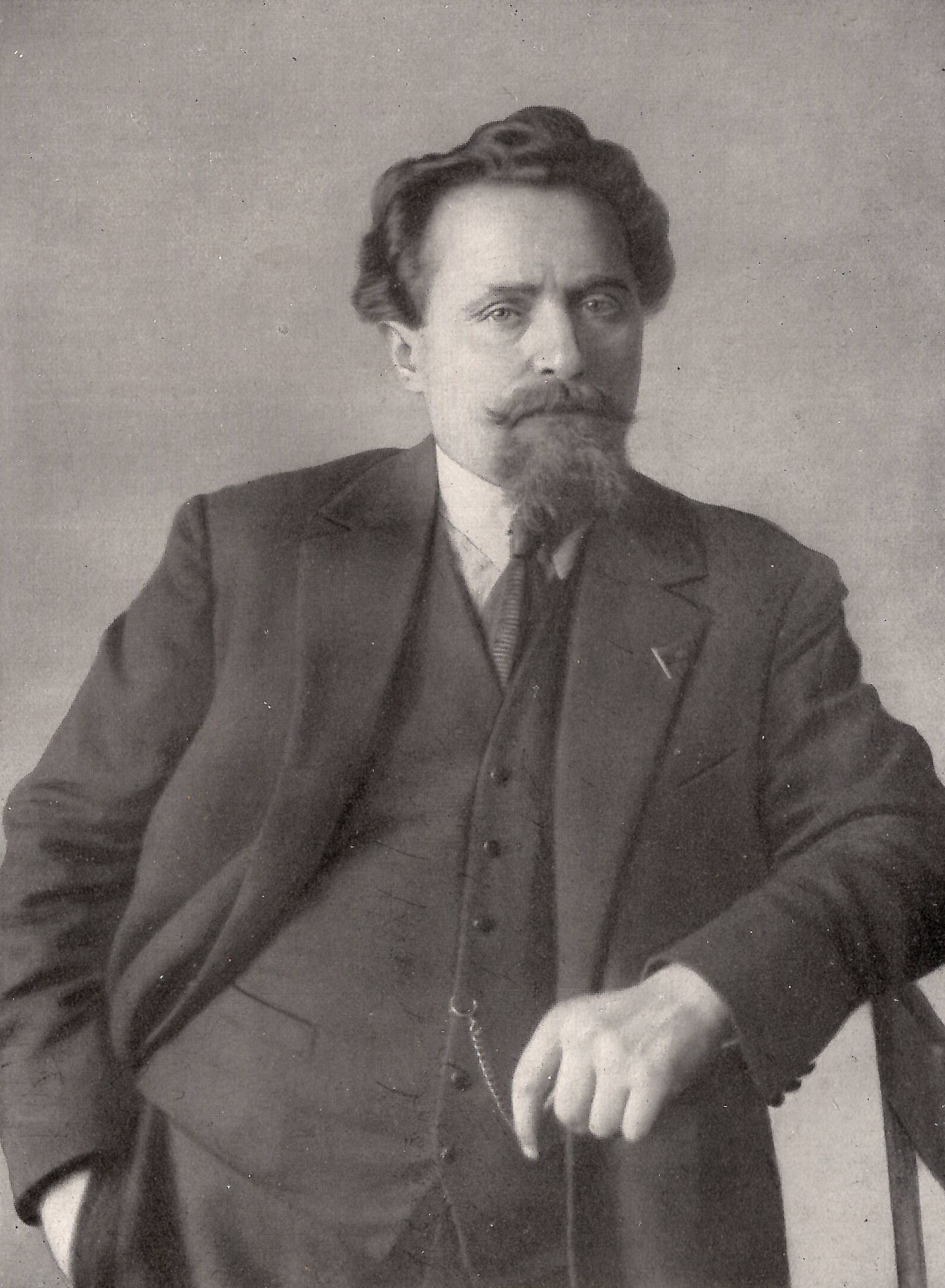
- Lozovsky in 1928

General Secretary of the Red International of Labour Unions
- In office 3 July 1921 – 1937
- Deputy: Andrés Nin
- Preceded by: Office established
- Succeeded by: Office abolished

Chairman of the International Trade Union Council
- In office 1920 – 3 July 1921
- Deputy: Mikhail Tomsky
- Preceded by: Office established
- Succeeded by: Office abolished

Personal details
- Born: 16 March 1878 Kolpino, Yekaterinoslav Governorate, Russian Empire
- Died: 12 August 1952 (aged 74) Bolshevo, Moscow Oblast, Russian SFSR, Soviet Union
- Party: RSDLP (1901–1903); RSDLP (Bolsheviks) (1903–1914); Russian Communist Party (Bolsheviks) (1917–1918, 1919–1949)
- Occupation: Trade unionist
- Awards: Order of Lenin; Order of the Patriotic War

Solomon Abramovich Lozovsky (Russian: Соломо́н Абра́мович Лозо́вский; (Note: family birth name: Dridzo Russian: Дридзо) 16 March 1878 – 12 August 1952) was a prominent Communist and Bolshevik revolutionary, a high-ranking official in the Soviet government, including as a Presidium member of the All-Union Central Council of Trade Unions, a Central Committee member of the Communist Party, a member of the Supreme Soviet, a deputy people's commissar for foreign affairs and the head of the Soviet Information Bureau (Sovinformburo). He was also the chair of the department of International Relations at the Higher Party School. Lozovsky was executed in 1952, together with thirteen other members of Jewish Anti-Fascist Committee, in an event known as the Night of the Murdered Poets. He was the last and oldest Old Bolshevik to be murdered on Stalin's orders.

== Biography ==
Born in 1878 in the Yekaterinoslav Governorate of Ukraine in the Russian Empire to a Jewish family (of possibly Sephardic lineage) he said at his trial near the end of his life that "my father was a Hebrew teacher. He knew Talmud ... and wrote poetry in Hebrew. My mother was illiterate. My father taught me to read Hebrew, to pray, and to read Russian." Having left school at 11, he returned to complete his education at the age of 20, served two years in the army (1901–1903), and joined the Russian Social Democratic Labour Party (RSDLP) in Yekaterinoslav in 1901. He spent two years organising railway workers. As was common for members of the underground movements of the time, he adopted a pseudonym, "Lozovsky" (from the town Lozovaya, near Kharkov, Ukraine). He moved to Saint Petersburg in August 1903, but was arrested soon after his arrival, and held in prison without trial for a year, before being exiled to Kazan. While in exile, in November 1904, he learnt about the split in the RSDLP, and joined the Bolsheviks. He was arrested in October 1905 for taking part in a raid on Kazan police station, released after three weeks, re-arrested in Saint Petersburg in December, then arrested twice in quick succession after escaping to Kharkov. He was in prison from July 1906 to May 1908, but escaped during deportation to Irkutsk. He spent the period from 1908 to 1917 in Paris, where at different times he ran an employment bureau for Russian émigrés, an adult school for electricians, a bakers' co-operative, and a garage. During this time he was a prominent Bolshevik "conciliator", who wanted to reunite all factions of the RSDLP, including the Mensheviks - an approach which brought him into conflict with Lenin. By 1914 he had either left or been expelled by the Bolsheviks, and his closest political links were with the left wing of the French Socialist Party. He rejoined the Bolsheviks in June 1917, after his return to Russia.

Even after rejoining the party, Lozovsky retained an independent position as secretary of the central trade union council, and on 17 November 1917, ten days after the Bolshevik revolution, published a personal credo, a series of statements each beginning "I cannot, in the name of party discipline stay silent..." Each statement was a protest against an aspect of the embryonic dictatorship - official lawlessness, arbitrary arrests, conscription, one-party rule etc. He wanted the Bolsheviks to form a coalition with other socialist parties, and protested at the dissolution of the Russian Constituent Assembly and, later, against the decision to sign a peace treaty with Germany. On 11 January 1918, he became the first prominent member to be expelled from the Russian Communist Party. He was removed from the central council of trade unions, but taken on as secretary of the textile workers' union. He joined and led the tiny International Social Democratic Party. When he tried to speak at the trade union congress in January 1919, to protest at the stifling of union independence, the communists shouted him down. He rejoined the Bolshevik Party in December 1919, and never publicly questioned the party line again.

When, in July 1920, the communist authorities in Moscow decided to create the Red International Labour Union (Profintern), Lozovsky's experience in the French trade-union movement made him the obvious choice for general secretary, even if he cut an incongruous figure among the trade-union representatives from the west. Victor Serge remembered him as having "the air of a slightly fastidious schoolmaster amidst his world-wide assortment of trade union militants whose political horizons did not extend very far beyond their own working-class districts at home". He also held ex officio positions on the Central Council of the Soviet trade unions and in the executive of the Comintern. When Mikhail Tomsky and other union leaders came out in opposition to the forced industrialisation drive inaugurated by Josif Stalin, Lozovsky was the only member of the council to support Stalin uncritically. He was equally loyal to the party line after the rise of Adolf Hitler in Germany, at a time (early 1930s) when the communists were denouncing the social democrats as "social fascists".

His children were equally reliable Stalinists. His older daughter was assigned to keep watch over the family of the Old Bolshevik Gleb Krzhizhanovsky, and his younger daughter, Vera Dridzo, was appointed to guard Nadezhda Krupskaya, the widow of Vladimir Lenin, so that "every line Krupskaya wrote about Lenin or the party had to pass through the fine sieve of Vera Solomonovna's vigilance". Krupskaya called her "my gendarme". Solomon Lozovsky's grandson, Vladimir Shamberg, married Volya Malenkova, daughter of Georgy Malenkov (but was forced by Malenkov to divorce her in January 1949).

The Profintern was wound up in 1937, when the communist policy changed to advocating a united front against fascism, and Lozovsky was appointed Deputy People's Commissar for Foreign Affairs, tasked with handling the Far East and Scandinavia. From 1939 to 1949 he was the oldest member of the Central Committee of the Communist Party of the Soviet Union. During World War II (Great Patriotic War of 1941–1945) he served as the vice-chairman of Sovinformburo, tasked with handling all the information flow from the Soviet battlefronts to the foreign press. In this capacity, he became a familiar figure to Western correspondents based in Moscow, one of whom wrote that "with a smooth, cosmopolitan veneer...and with his barbiche and carefully cut clothes, (he) looked rather like an old boulevardier, whom one could well imagine on the terrace of the Napolitain during la belle epoque". In 1941, upon being told of foreign news reports that German soldiers could see Moscow with their binoculars, Lozovsky famously retorted: "the Germans would undoubtedly see Moscow, but as prisoners of war." He was also a member of the Jewish Anti-Fascist Committee, organised as a part of Sovinformburo, which sought to influence international public opinion and to organise political and material support for the war campaign, especially amongst Jews in Allied countries. From 1945 to 1948 chaired the Sovinformburo.

In 1943, the actor Solomon Mikhoels and others began pushing for the formation of a Jewish homeland within the borders of the Soviet Union. Lozovsky advised that the best location would be Crimea, and helped Mikhoels draft a written appeal to the Kremlin in February 1944. After the proclamation of the state of Israel (14 May 1948), Stalin interpreted this talk as a Jewish conspiracy, and ordered the police to organise a show trial, with Lozovsky as the main defendant. He was arrested on 26 January 1949, and tortured. Despite incredible pressure and despite being over 70 years old, Lozovsky never admitted guilt or accused others. The closed trial lasted for two-and-a-half months (May to July 1952), during which Lozovsky's testimony shone "out of this primordial darkness as the most remarkable and moving oration of dignity and courage in all of Stalin's trials." The skill with which he destroyed the prosecution caused the judge, Alexander Cheptsov, to interrupt the trial for a week, twice, to ensure and appeal for the investigation to be reopened - something that never happened in any other political trial during the Stalin years. Even after he had carried out his instruction to return a verdict of guilty, on 18 July 1952, Cheptsov refused to order that the death sentences be carried out immediately, he forwarded an appeal for clemency to Stalin, which was rejected. Lozovsky was executed on 12 August 1952, together with thirteen other members of Jewish Anti-Fascist Committee, in an event known as the Night of the Murdered Poets.

The stenographic report of the trial was published only in 1994 and then only in a highly edited form. Following the release of the documents, it also emerged that Nikita Khrushchev issued a posthumous pardon to Lozovsky and to all executed members of the Jewish Anti-Fascist committee, stating that the trials were conducted in "flagrant violations of the law".
