= Unión del Trabajo de Filipinas =

The Unión del Trabajo de Filipinas (UTF; lit. 'Labor Union of the Philippines') was a trade union confederation in the Philippines. It was formed, with support of the U.S. administration of William Howard Taft, as a substitute for the defunct Unión Obrera Democrática Filipina. The UTF was modelled after the American Federation of Labor, and represented a much more moderate political line than its predecessor. Lope K. Santos, head of the union at the Katubusan Cigar and Cigarette Factory, was the president of the UTF. Political rivalries led to the dissolution of UTF in 1907.
