= Marxist–Leninist Party of the Philippines =

Political party in the Philippines

Marxist–Leninist Party of the Philippines Marxista-Leninistang Partido ng Pilipinas
- Founded: 1998
- Armed wing: Rebolusyonaryong Hukbong Bayan
- Ideology: Communism; Marxism-Leninism; National democracy
- Political position: Far-left

The Marxist–Leninist Party of the Philippines (Tagalog: Marxista–Leninistang Partido ng Pilipinas) is a Marxist-Leninist party in the Philippines with an ongoing conflict against the Philippine government through its armed wing, the Rebolusyonaryong Hukbong Bayan (RHB).

== History ==
The group, which operates mainly in Central Luzon, was formed in 1998, when it broke away from the Communist Party of the Philippines because of ideological differences.

In 2002, the first the surrender of some leaders began, especially due to the harsh conditions they were in at the mountain camps. On March 3 of 2003, members of the MLPP-RHB members killed a Tanod in Purok 1, barangay Barruya, Pampanga. In May 4 of 2003, ten Marxist–Leninist Party of the Philippines-Rebolusyonaryong Hukbong Bayan (MLPP-RHB) were killed after an encounter with government forces in Barangay Taposo in Candelaria, Zambales 24th Infantry Battalion, found two M14 rifles, an M16 rifle, four grenades, 307 bullets for an M-60, a two-way radio, a binocular, 22 backpacks containing the insurgents’ personal belongings and documents said army members.

The conflict is still ongoing, although incidents covered in the media focus more on incidents arising from the rivalry between RHB and NPA.

On October 30, 2007, Arturo Tolentino — known by his nom de guerre Ka Siano or Ka Turo — was killed in an encounter against authorities in Barangay, Samal, Bataan. Authorities pointed him as principal suspect for the murder of Chief Inspector Guillermo Tolentino, who was then an assistant intelligence officer of Bataan in 2000.

On August 2010, five members of MLPP-RHB were arrested by elements of the Philippine Army and Philippine National Police, after being captured at the end of a chase in Central Luzon. On May 16, the armed wing "Partisano" claimed the assassination of Edwin Abella, head of Barangay North Bay Boulevard South, in his house in Navotas.

=== Decline ===
In June 2015, an encounter in a security house between MLPP-RHB members left five guerrillas killed, and the arrest of Ryan Lising, after an operation in Barangay San Jose Matulid, Mexico, Pampanga. The authorities seized one M16 rifle, two carbines, four short firearms, a hand grenade, two .38 caliber revolvers, and an undetermined amount ammunitions and magazines.

On January 23, 2016 the Malabon City Councilor Merlin "Tiger" Mañalac was shot dead by motorcycle riding gunmen, near his home in Bangaray Tinajeras, Malabon. Authorities claimed that the attack were perpetrard by MLPP-RHB guerrillas. The MLPP-RHB later denied being relater for the homicide, condemned the manner by which the group was used to mislead the research. On November 26, 2018, nine members of the MLPP-RHB surrendered at one of the patrol bases of the 48th Infantry Battalion in the province of Bataan, giving up one improvised M14 rifle with 26 rounds, two caliber .38 revolvers with 13 live ammunition and one hand grenade.

== See also ==
- Communism in the Philippines
- Communist rebellion in the Philippines
- Communist armed conflicts in the Philippines
