= Unión Obrera Democrática Filipina =

Trade union federation in the Philippines from 1902 to 1904

Philippine Democratic Labor Union
- Unión Obrera Democrática Filipina
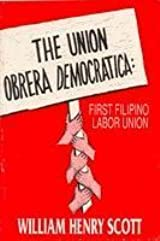
- Front cover of the book "The Union Obrera Democratica: First Filipino Labor Union" written by historian William Henry Scott, published in 1993.
- Predecessor: Unión Democrática de Litografos, Impresores, Encuadernadores y Otros Obreros (labor union)
- Successor: Unión del Trabajo de Filipinas; Unión de Impresores de Filipinas-1906; Congreso Obrero de Filipinas
- Founded: February 2, 1902; Sampaloc, Manila, Philippine Islands
- Founder: Isabelo de los Reyes
- Dissolved: 1904
- Location: Philippines
- Members: 150,000 (1903)
- Key people: Isabelo de los Reyes; Hermenegildo Cruz; Dominador Gomez; Pascual H. Poblete
- Formerly called: Unión Obrera Democrática (Democratic Workers Union)

The Unión Obrera Democrática Filipina (UOD or UODF, English: Philippine Democratic Labor Union) was a national trade union center in the Philippines. The organization was considered as the first-ever modern trade union federation in the history of the country, composed of unions from various labor industries; earlier and prior labor groups had been more of mutual aid societies and guilds. The organization had thirty-three affiliated trade unions as of 1902.

In 1903, the organization counted 150 affiliated unions, with around 20,000 members in the Manila area. At its peak, the Union Obrera Democratica had approximately 150,000 members in eight provinces of Luzon. Its members were also the very first members of the Philippine Independent Church when it was proclaimed in 1902. Its goals included independence from the United States. After two consecutive leaders, Isabelo de los Reyes and Dominador Gomez, were imprisoned by the U.S. administration and forced to abandon trade unionism, the organization disintegrated.

== Founding ==
In June 1901, the printers at the then-American-owned newspaper The Manila Times formed an industrial union: the Union de Impresores (UI), which was considered the first labor union in the Philippines. Similar unions were soon formed at other printing places in Manila, and on either December 30, 1901 or in January 1902, a conference was held that united them in a single organization. The organization was then called the Union de Impresores de Filipinas (UIF, "Printers' Union of the Philippines") which was later renamed to Union de Litografos y Impresores de Filipinas (ULIF). Its first president was Hermenegildo Cruz. Shortly after, ULIF was later renamed again to Unión Democrática de Litógrafos, Impresores, Encuadernadores y Otros Obreros ("Democratic Union of Lithographers, Printers, Bookbinders and Other Workers") after Cruz and some of its members approached Isabelo de los Reyes to seek advice in forming a workers' movement and cooperative store based on memberships' savings or contributions.

Soon after its founding, and realizing to include other workers outside the printing business, the members of the then-ULIF, spearheaded by de los Reyes, reorganized themselves as a trade union federation and thus, the Unión Obrera Democrática (UOD, "Democratic Workers Union") was formally established on February 2, 1902, at a congress of "approximately 140 printers and lithographers and representatives from other guilds including those of tobacco workers, carpenters, cooks, tailors, shoeworkers, mariners, and laborers" gathered at Variedades Theater in Sampaloc, Manila. Isabelo de los Reyes was elected president of the organization, whilst Hermenegildo Cruz was elected secretary. Except for Cruz, all the elected founding officers were "rich manufacturers and employers in Manila." The founding congress adopted the principles of two books, Vida e Obras de Carlos Marx ("Life and Works of Karl Marx") by Friedrich Engels, and Between Peasants by Italian anarchist Errico Malatesta, as the political foundation of the movement.

According to historian Melinda Tria Kerkvliet, the main goals of the organization were: "to improve working conditions through protective labor legislation; locate work for the unemployed and assist their families; provide free education for workers' children; assist sick members and those in distress; and emancipate workers through saving and related projects."

== Activities ==
The activities of UOD centered on improving the general welfare of workers and pushing for Philippine independence from the United States. Among these were:

=== July 1902 independence rally ===
The UOD organized a mass rally on July 4 (the Independence Day of the United States), 1902, with around 70,000 participants. The rally demanded independence for the Philippines.

=== August 1902 strike ===
The organization called for a national general strike campaign on August 2, 1902, a day before the proclamation of the Philippine Independent Church, in protest of the refusal of the government to comply with the demands for increased wages for the workers. In culmination of the general strike campaign, the following day despite heavy rain, in a meeting of about 42 prominent members at the Centro de Bellas Artes in Quiapo, Manila, the organization, led by its president Isabelo de los Reyes, launched and proclaimed the establishment of the Philippine Independent Church, a schismatic church from the authority of the state-sponsored Roman Catholic Church. The first strike action then occurred on August 9, 1902, as workers at the Malabon Commercial Tobacco Factory went on strike. The Union Obrera Democratica organized various walk-outs in factories in Manila and adjacent cities in support of the strike. As a result of the strike, wages were increased in some factories. Working hours were, however, unaffected. The state authorities responded to the general strike by arresting four union leaders and Isabelo de los Reyes on August 15 and August 17, 1902, respectively. De los Reyes was sentenced to four months in jail.

=== Gomez at the helm ===
De los Reyes was pardoned soon after being jailed, on condition that he would not continue as a labor organizer. De los Reyes tendered his resignation while in prison in September 1902 and Cruz immediately assembled a meeting to elect a new president for the organization. Spanish Filipino physician and writer Dr. Dominador Gomez was elected as the new president of Union Obrera Democratica in September 1902. After the election of Gomez, the name of the organization was changed to Union Obrera Democratica Filipina (UODF, "Philippine Democratic Labor Union"). De los Reyes was eventually released in January 1903.

=== May Day 1903 ===
In April 1903, a meeting was held at the Malacañan Palace between the Union Obrera Democratica Filipina leaders (including Gomez) and governor-general William H. Taft, in which the trade unionists demanded that May 1 be celebrated as Labor Day. No agreement was reached, as Taft and Gomez clashed verbally. Following this meeting, Gomez was labelled as a "subversive" element. Requests from the Union Obrera Democratica Filipina to organize a rally on May 1 was denied by the authorities.

In the end, UODF organized a massive anti-imperialist rally with around 100,000 participants outside the Malacañan Palace. This was the first May Day celebration in the Philippines.

== Disintegration and aftermath ==
Gomez was subsequently arrested and condemned to forced labor. Like De los Reyes, he was acquitted on the condition that he leave UODF and help in the negotiations for the surrender of Macario Sakay to the Insular Government. Following Gomez's resignation, unions began disaffiliating from UODF. Moreover, the U.S. administration began bringing American Federation of Labor organizers to the country, trying to promote a less confrontational type of unionism (leading to the foundation of the Union del Trabajo de Filipinas).

Following its disintegration, other labor federations emerged such as the Congreso Obrero de Filipinas.

== See also ==
- Unión de Impresores de Filipinas
- Anarchism in the Philippines
