= Partido Obrero de Filipinas =

Labor Party of the Philippines: Partido Obrero de Filipinas (Spanish); Lapiang Manggagawa sa Pilipinas (Tagalog)
- Founder: Crisanto Evangelista; Domingo Ponce; Cirilo Bognot
- Founded: 1924
- Dissolved: 1930
- Succeeded by: CPPI
- Ideology: Marxism; Left-wing nationalism Tan Malaka Thought
- Political position: Far-left
- Colors: Red

The Partido Obrero de Filipinas (lit. ''Labor Party of the Philippines'') was a Marxist political party formed in 1924 by Filipino labor organizers Crisanto Evangelista, Domingo Ponce and Cirilo Bognot during the administration of the Insular Government of the Philippine Islands. This party later formed the core of the Partido Komunista sa Pilipinas (Communist Party of the Philippine Islands) which was established in 1930.

== History ==
Crisanto Evangelista had been an active labor organizer since 1906 and was an organizer of the Congreso Obrero de Filipinas (Spanish, "Philippine Labor Congress") in 1913. Evangelista was also affiliated with the Nacionalista Party but in 1924 he, Ponce and Bognot failed to acquire berths in the Nacionalista Party's lineup as Manila councilors. They established Partido Obrero de Filipinas in response, seeing the group as a counterpoint to the colonial political parties. Though organizationally weak, Partido Obrero was aggressive, labeling other politicians as "traitors to independence" from the Americans.

According to author Melinda Tria Kerkvliet, in 1925 Evangelista may have been influenced by the Indonesian communist Tan Malaka (who had posed as a Filipino in 1925, using the alias "Elias Fuentes") to organize Partido Obrero de Filipinas as "a political party advocating a different ideology". In 1930, Evangelista founded the Partido Komunista sa Pilipinas.
