= Hermenegildo Cruz =

Filipino writer, labor organizer, and legislator

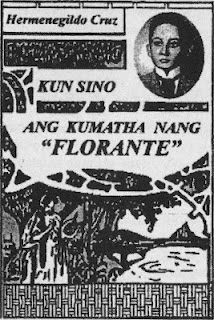
- Earlier cover of Kun Sino ang Kumatha nang "Florante", by Hermenegildo Cruz (1906), with inset photo of Cruz.
- Born: December 31, 1880; Binondo, Manila, Captaincy General of the Philippines
- Died: March 21, 1943 (aged 62); Manila, Philippine Commonwealth
- Resting place: San Agustin Church, Intramuros, Manila, Philippines
- Occupations: Writer, trade union organizer, assemblyman, bureaucrat
- Notable work: Kung Sino ang Kumatha ng "Florante"

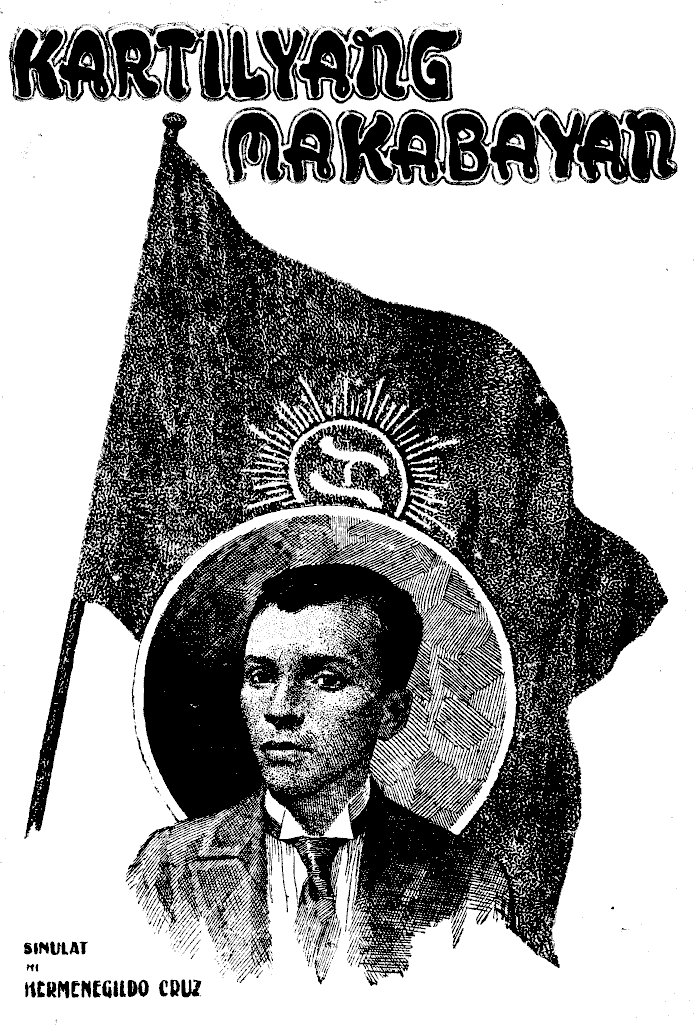
Cover of Kartilyang Makabayan: Mga Tanong at Sagot Ukol Kay Andrés Bonifacio at sa KKK, by Hermenegildo Cruz (1922)

Hermenegildo Cruz (1880–1943) was a Filipino writer and prominent trade union organizer.

Cruz grew up from a poor family in Binondo, Manila. He was a founding member of various and the earliest trade union organizations in the Philippines, notably of Unión Obrera Democrática Filipina, Unión de Impresores de Filipinas, and Congreso Obrero de Filipinas. He became a member of the Philippine Assembly and was assistant director of the Bureau of Labor from 1918 to 1922, and eventually its director from 1922 to 1935. Following his retirement in 1935, he served as technical adviser on labor matters to President Manuel L. Quezon.

A notable literary work of his is Kun Sino ang Kumathâ ng̃ "Florante" [sic] (English: lit. 'On Who Authored 'Florante'?'), published in 1906, which is cited as "the first attempt to explain Francisco Balagtas by dealing with the poet's biography and the historical context of the poem". Another work, Kartilyang Makabayan: Mga Tanong at Sagot Ukol Kay Andrés Bonifacio at sa KKK, is a biography of Andrés Bonifacio, the father of the Philippine Revolution and the secret society he founded, the Katipunan.

== See also ==
- Florante at Laura
- Francisco Balagtas
- Trade unions in the Philippines
