= Congreso Obrero de Filipinas =

Trade union federation in the Philippines

Labor Congress of the Philippines
- Congreso Obrero de Filipinas
- Predecessor: Unión Obrera Democrática Filipina; Unión de Impresores de Filipinas-1906
- Successor: Katipunan ng mga Anak-Pawis sa Pilipinas
- Founded: May 1, 1913
- Dissolved: 1937
- Location: Philippines
- Key people: Hermenegildo Cruz; Primitivo Cruz
- Affiliations: Pan-Pacific Trade Union Secretariat

The Congreso Obrero de Filipinas (Labor Congress of the Philippines, acronym COF) was a trade union federation in the Philippines, established in 1913 and dissolving into a paper organization which vanished towards the end of the 1930s. The COF was considered the second labor federation in the history of Manila's labor movement.

== History ==
=== Establishment ===
The congress was established on May 1, 1913. Its first convention was attended by 155 representatives from 35 organizations. Participating in its first convention were various occupation groups such as cigar makers, government employees, typographers, lithographers, bookbinders, journalists, sailors, clerks, mechanics, and lawyers. The first COF convention lasted four days. Hermenegildo Cruz was elected president, while Primitivo Cruz was chosen as secretary.

The COF manifesto had five goals:

1. resolve labor problems and questions
2. write a Labor Code to serve as a guide for workers during strikes or conflicts with management
3. set up measures that would lend dignity to the Filipino workers
4. establish defined guidelines on how to form trade unions
5. resolve all problems concerning labor and those submitted for its consideration.

The official publication of the COF was the Tambuli, which lasted only a year.

=== Profintern affiliation and organizational split ===
On June 30, 1927 the COF formally affiliated with the Pan-Pacific Trade Union Secretariat (PPTUS), the Pacific regional subdivision of the Red International of Labor Unions (RILU, commonly known as the Profintern). The organization claimed 70,000 adherents at the time of affiliation with this Communist International-backed organization. This affiliation exacerbated a growing division between revolutionary left and reformist right wings of the labor organization, with the radicals headed by Philippine Communist leader Crisanto Evangelista and the moderates by one Tejada of the Philippine Tobacco Workers Union.

Factional battling on the Executive Committee of the COF preceded an all out battle at the 1929 convention of the organization, in which radicals charged that moderates attempted to pack the gathering, with 188 delegates instead of its assigned 54 appearing to represent the Tobacco Workers' Union and another 65 materializing from a tiny 250 member Stevedores' Union. The matter was referred to the convention's Credentials Committee, which expressed misgivings about the situation. Chairman of the convention Tejada put the matter to the congress itself, which voted to accept the challenged delegates, thereby provoking a split by about half the delegates. These reassembled elsewhere in a "provisional conference" which launched a rival organization called the "Congreso Obrero de Filipinas (proletariat)." A formal congress to establish this parallel organization was called for May 12, 1929.

=== Dissolution ===
Although the COF was still around by 1937, by this juncture the federation continued only as a paper organization.
