= Profintern =

International labour union confederation

- Red International of Labour Unions
- Красный интернационал профсоюзов
- Founded: 3 July 1921
- Dissolved: 1937
- Headquarters: Moscow, Soviet Union
- Location: International
- Key people: Mikhail Tomsky; Solomon Lozovsky; Andreu Nin
- Affiliations: Communist International

The Red International of Labour Unions (RILU; Russian: Красный интернационал профсоюзов, romanized: Krasnyi internatsional profsoyuzov), commonly known as the Profintern (Профинтерн), was an international body established by the Communist International (Comintern) with the aim of coordinating communist activities within trade unions.

Formally established in 1921, the Profintern aimed to act as a counterweight to the influence of the so-called "Amsterdam International", the social-democratic International Federation of Trade Unions (founded in 1919), an organization which the Comintern branded as "class-collaborationist" and as an impediment to revolution. After entering a period of decline in the middle 1930s, the Profintern was finally dissolved in 1937 with the advent of Comintern's "Popular Front" policy.

== Organizational history ==
=== Preliminary organization ===
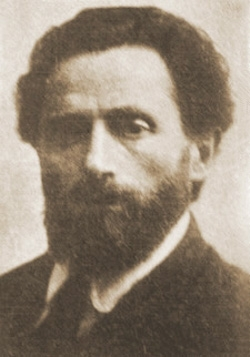
Solomon Lozovsky, head of the Red International of Labour Unions.

In July 1920, at the behest of Comintern head Grigory Zinoviev, the 2nd World Congress of the Communist International established a temporary International Trade Union Council, commonly known by its Russian acronym, Mezhsovprof. This organizing committee—including members of the Russian, Italian, British, Bulgarian, and French delegations to the Comintern Congress—was presented with the task of organizing "an international congress of Red trade unions.

Soviet trade union leader Solomon Lozovsky was named president of this new council, assisted by British unionist Tom Mann and Alfred Rosmer of France. The Executive Committee of the Communist International (ECCI) directed the new council to issue a manifesto to "all trade unions of the world", condemning the social democratic International Federation of Trade Unions based in Amsterdam as a "yellow" organization and inviting them to join a new revolutionary international union association.

This decision was to mark a split of the international trade union movement that followed the recently achieved split of the international socialist political movement into revolutionary Communist and electorally-oriented Socialist camps. This desire for a new exclusive international of explicitly "Red" union represented a fundamental contradiction with the Comintern's firm insistence that Communists should work within the structure of existing trade unions—an important detail noted at the time by delegate Jack Tanner of the British Shop Stewards Movement. Tanner's objection was brushed aside as Grigory Zinoviev denied him the floor, referring his complaints to committee.

Historian E. H. Carr argues that the decision to launch a Red International of Labour Unions at all was a byproduct of the era of heady revolutionary fervor that world revolution was around the corner, declaring:

"It was a step taken in a moment of hot-headed enthusiasm and the firm conviction of the imminence of the European revolution; and a device designed to bridge a short transition and prepare the way for the great consummation had unexpected and fatal consequences when the interim period dragged on into months and years."

As the plan for a new labour international moved forward, Mezhsovprof established propaganda bureaus in different countries in an attempt to win the existing unions affiliated to the rival "Amsterdam International," as the International Federation of Trade Unions was commonly known, over to the forthcoming "Red International." These bureaus attracted the most rebellious and dissident trade unionists to their banner while at the same time alienating sometimes conservative union leaderships, already raising charges that what was actually being proffered was dual unionism and a destructive split of the existing unions.

On 9 January 1921, ECCI decided that the launch of a new Red International of Trade Unions would take place at a conference to be convened on May Day of that year. An appeal was issued to the trade unions of the world who were "opposed to the Amsterdam International" and called for their affiliation to the new organization. This conclave was ultimately postponed until July, however, so that it could be synchronized with the scheduled 3rd World Congress of the Comintern—travel to and from Soviet Russia being a difficult and dangerous process in these years.

Grandiose claims were made about the new organization, with Lozovsky declaring in a speech in May 1921 that already unions representing 14 million workers had proclaimed their allegiance to the forthcoming Red International. Zinoviev ferociously declared the Amsterdam International to be "the last barricade of the international bourgeoisie"—fighting words to social democratic trade unionists.

For their own part, the Social Democratic trade union movement emerged from World War I relatively united, on the offensive, and unbowed. Even before the Profintern was launched, the line in the sand was clearly drawn, with the Amsterdam International declaring at a May 1921 executive session that it was "not permissible for trade union organizations to be affiliated to two trade union International at the same time" and adding that "every organization which affiliates to the political trade union International of Moscow places itself outside the International Federation of Trade Unions." The great civil war within the world trade union movement had begun.

=== The foundation congress of 1921 ===
The short-lived official organ of RILU, published in Moscow, was The Red Labour Union International. This journal was soon supplanted by a variety of publications produced by RILU's member sections.

The Founding Congress of the Red International of Trade Unions was convened in Moscow on 3 July 1921. The gathering was attended by 380 delegates from around the world, including 336 with voting rights, claiming to represent 17 million of the 40 million trade union members worldwide. The gathering was neither homogeneous nor harmonious, as it quickly became clear that a number of delegates held a syndicalist perspective that sought to avoid politics and participation in the existing trade unions altogether, in favor of direct action leading to workers' control of industry. These delegates sought the new Red International of Labour Unions to be fully independent of the Communist International, seen as a political organization.

Among those expressing such a desire for the organizational independence of RILU from the Comintern was "Big Bill" Haywood of the Industrial Workers of the World (IWW)—an individual already living in Moscow after skipping bail to avoid a lengthy prison sentence under the Espionage Act. The IWW's perspective was joined by syndicalist trade unionists that were part of the French and Spanish delegations. Ultimately, however, the syndicalist elements proved a small minority and the Congress approved a resolution sponsored by Mann and Rosmer which called for "the closest possible link" between the Profintern and Comintern, including joint sessions of the organizations, as well as "real and intimate revolutionary unity" between the Red unions and the Communist parties at the national level.

Despite the initiative of starting a new trade union international in direct competition with the previously existing Amsterdam international, the Profintern in its initial phase continued to insist that its strategy was not to "snatch out of the unions the best and most conscious workers," but rather to remain in the existing unions in order to "revolutionize" them. The founding Congress's official resolution on organization declared that the withdrawal from the existing mass unions and abandonment of their memberships to their often conservative leaderships "plays into the hands of the counter-revolutionary trade union bureaucracy and therefore should be sharply and categorically rejected."

Still, the Profintern insisted upon a real split of the labour movement, establishing conditions for admission which included "a break with the yellow Amsterdam International." The organization effectively advocated that radicalized workers engage in "boring from within" the existing unions in order to disassociate the full organizations from Amsterdam and for Moscow. Such tactics insured bitter internal division as non-Communist members of the rank-and-file and their elected union leaderships sought to maintain existing affiliations.

As part of its strategy for winning over the existing unions, the Profintern decided to establish a network of what it called "International Propaganda Committees" (IPCs), international associations of radical unions and organized fractional minorities in unions that were established on the basis of their specific industry. These groups were intended to conduct conferences and publish and distribute pamphlets and periodicals in order to propagandize for the idea of revolution and for the establishment the dictatorship of the proletariat. The IPCs were to attempt to raise funds to help sustain their efforts, with the governing Executive Bureau of Profintern subsidizing their publications. By August 1921 a total of 14 IPCs had been established.

The Profintern's International Propaganda Committees proved ineffectual in changing the opinions of union memberships. Unions began to expel their radical dissidents and international unions began to expel those national sections which participated in the activities of the Profintern, exemplified by the October 1921 expulsion of the Dutch Transport Workers' Federation from its international trade organization.

=== The 2nd World Congress of 1922 ===
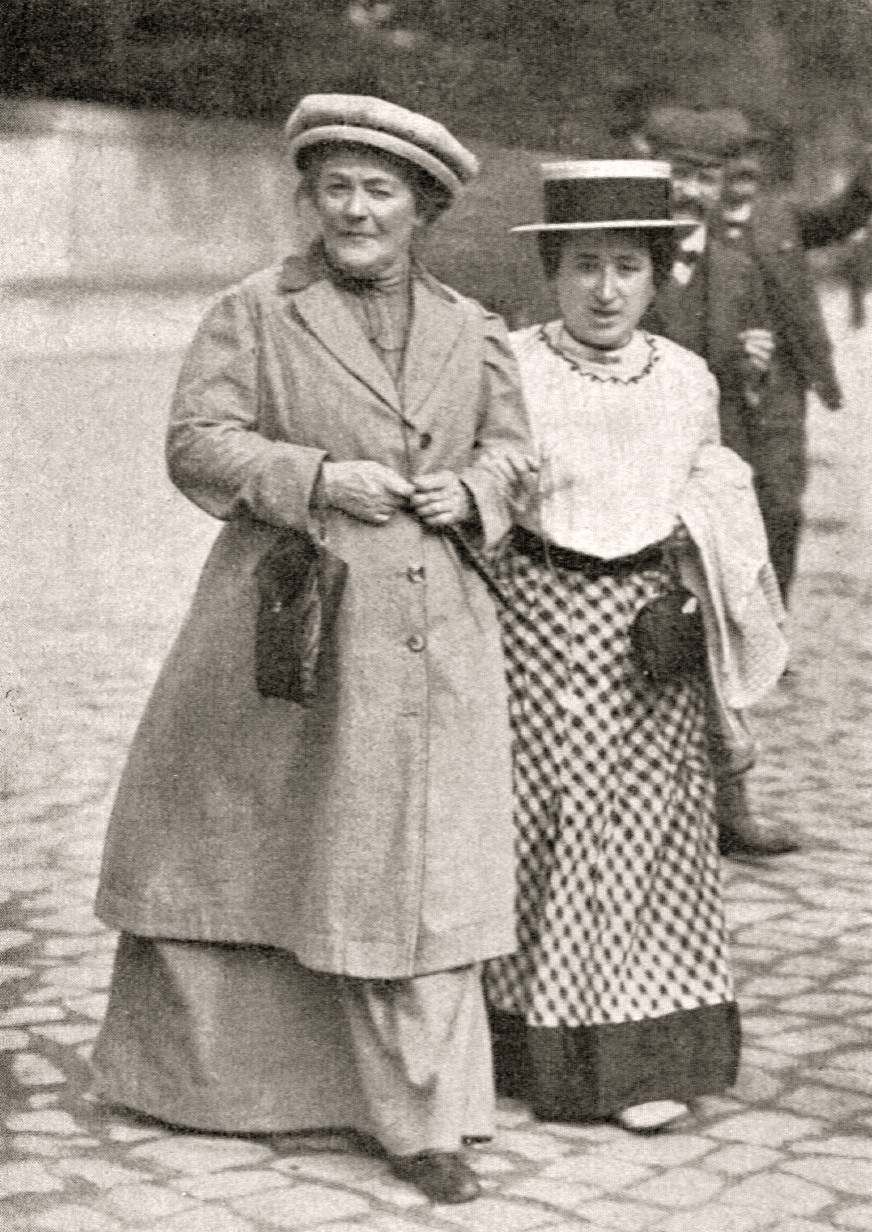
Veteran activist Clara Zetkin (left) was the face of the "united front" efforts of the Comintern and Profintern following the 2nd World Congress of RILU in 1922.

The 2nd World Congress of RILU was held in Moscow in November 1922, in conjunction with the 4th World Congress of the Comintern.

As might be expected, the 1922 RILU Congress spent much of its time shaping the application of the Comintern's recently adopted united front policy to the trade union movement. With the prospects for imminent world revolution on the wane, RILU head Solomon Lozovsky proposed an international conference bringing together leaderships of RILU, the Amsterdam International, and various unaffiliated unions—a gathering which was to echo the April 1922 meeting between the Second International, the Two-and-a-Half International, and the Comintern in Berlin "to work out parallel forms and methods of struggle against the offensive of capitalism."

In retrospect, 1922 marked the high-water mark for the Profintern's size and influence in Europe, with a sizable new contingent joining the organization's ranks in France when the Confédération Genérale du Travail (CGT) attempted to discipline and expel its syndicalist members but ended up causing a full scale organizational split in which the majority of French trade unionists affiliated with a new "Red" union.

Additional headway was made in Czechoslovakia, where a majority of trade union members similarly affiliated with RILU, following a campaign of expulsions of Communist individuals and unions by the Social Democratic leadership. In October 1922 the Czech Red unions held a congress of their own, formalizing the split with the Social Democratic unions. It is worthy of mention that the Communist Party of Czechoslovakia was an extremely large organization in this period, claiming 170,000 members in 1922, dwarfing all but a few Communist parties around the world.

In Bulgaria the All-Bulgarian Federation of unions chose to affiliate with the Profintern outright, but even that movement was split when opponents established a rival organization called the Free Federation of Trade Unions. Spain, too, saw its national labour movement formally divided. The climate was acrimonious as bitter charges and counter-charges levying responsibility for the shattering the trade union movement flew in all directions.

The professed desire of the Profintern for a united front came to fruition of sorts in December 1922, when the organization met at a peace conference in The Hague with representatives of the rival Amsterdam International, presided over by British union leader J.H. Thomas. As was the case with the meeting of the three political Internationals earlier in the year, the session ended in failure, with accusations flying in both directions and Lozovsky's plea for a united front arbitrarily dismissed as a transparent tactical ploy.

This failure was followed up in January 1923 by a joint appeal of the Comintern and Profintern for the creation of an "action committee against fascism," followed in March with the establishment of a formal Action Committee Against Fascism in Berlin, headed by Clara Zetkin. An international conference of this group was called to be held later that same month in Frankfurt, Germany with invitations extended to the parties of the Second International and the unions of the Amsterdam International, but only a few Social Democrats attended, the overwhelming majority of the gathering being Communists. Delegates from Germany, Soviet Russia, France, and Britain united to denounce the Versailles Peace Treaty and the related Occupation of the Ruhr by France to enforce the onerous reparations levied against Germany. The die had been cast, however, and no joint activities between the political or union leaders of the Social Democratic and Communist Internationals would be result from the initiative.

Lozovsky reported on RILU's progress to the 12th Congress of the Russian Communist Party (b) in April 1923, at which he claimed that the Profintern represented 13 million unionists against 14 or 15 million for the rival Amsterdam International. This figure is regarded by at least one serious historian of the matter as "probably exaggerated."

=== The 3rd World Congress of 1924 ===
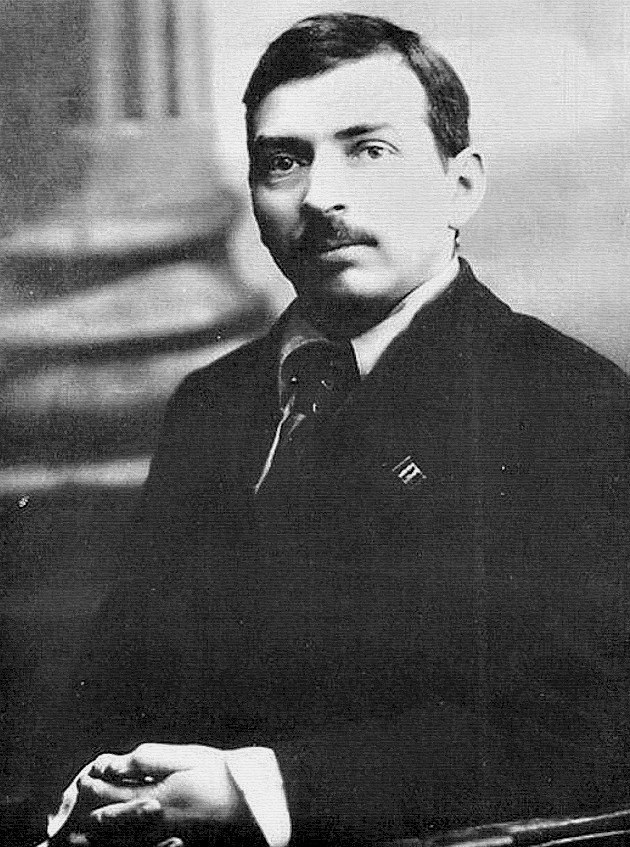
Soviet trade union chief Mikhail Tomsky was the key figure in a Soviet effort to establish close bilateral relations with the British union movement during the middle 1920s.

The 3rd World Congress of the Profintern opened on 8 July 1924, having been scheduled to begin in Moscow immediately following the 5th World Congress of the Comintern (17 June to 8 July 1924). Seventy delegates from the Profintern were made "consultative" (non-voting) delegates to the Comintern gathering, assuring a very close connection between the two gatherings.

The 1924 Congress formally marked a hardening of the Communist attitude towards the Social Democratic labour movement, declaring that "fascism and democracy are two forms of the bourgeois dictatorship."

The most contentious issue debated by the Congress related to the strategy and tactics of seeking unity with the Amsterdam International, thereby bringing an end to the disruption suffered by the labour movement as a result of the split into two internationals. With forcing the IFTU to capitulate untenable and independent entry of the Russian trade unions into their industrial federations affiliated with the IFTU, the sole option remaining, in Solomon Lozovsky's view, was to attempt to achieve some sort of fusion of the two Internationals through an international conference. Lozovsky contended that unity was not to be achieved through the sacrifice of the Profintern's program or tactics and the blind acceptance of reformism, but rather was to be accompanied by the penetration of communist ideas into the minds of the rank-and-file trade unionists of the European unions.

A proposal was made by Gaston Monmousseau of France calling for a World Unity Congress of the Red and Amsterdam Internationals, and a committee of 35 delegates was selected to debate the proposal and to flesh out the practical details. Following two days of debate, the commission reported back to the assembled Congress, bringing with it a unity proposal that had been accepted in the preliminary hearings with one sole dissenting vote. The final proposal for a unity congress proved little more than a platitude, however, with the resolution declaring that such a gathering "might, after suitable preparation of the masses" prove appropriate. There was no firm directive instructing the Profintern Executive Board to action.

With relations between the Profintern and the IFTU at the point of insoluble stalemate, Soviet trade union authorities began to concentrate on bilateral relationships with social democratic union movements. Particular attention was placed on the unions of Great Britain, with Russian union chief Mikhail Tomsky traveling to the UK in 1924, followed by a reciprocal visit in November of that year of a high-level delegation headed by A.A. Purcell of the Trades Union Congress. From the Soviet standpoint the British unionists were positively affected by their visit, publishing an extensive and generally favorable report of the Soviet situation upon their return to the UK. This month-long visit of the British trade union delegation would be the prototype for a series of similar visits of the Soviet Union by western union leaders.

While the groundwork for ties between the Soviet and western trade union movement began to be successfully laid, the situation between the international organizations based in Amsterdam and Moscow festered. The Second International and the IFTC held a joint meeting in Brussels during the first week of January 1925 and emerged with a scathing denunciation of the Soviet Union and its sympathizers in the British trade union movement that were organized in a RILU-subsidized organization known as the National Minority Movement. A similar presence in the American Federation of Labor in the form of the Trade Union Educational League went without comment owing to the AFL's ongoing refusal to affiliate with the Amsterdam International. These objections by the IFTU failed to stymie continued development of bilateral Soviet-British ties, however, as in April 1925 Tomsky returned to London as part of an effort to establish a joint committee for trade union unity between the two countries.

If Tomsky had the ulterior motive of seeking to win British unionists to the ranks of the Profintern, he was met with a surprising reversal, as E.H. Carr noted in 1964:

"The British leaders had little interest in Profintern, which they secretly regarded, from the experience of the British movement, either as a nuisance or as a sham, and wished, by reconciling the Soviet trade unions with the existing [Amsterdam] International. to strengthen it and give it a turn to the Left. The British delegates probably shocked their Soviet colleagues by coming out openly in favour of the affiliation of the Russian unions to IFTU."

Tomsky, although diplomatic in his reply, rejected the British suggestion out of hand as an abject surrender to the Amsterdam International akin to the 1918 forced surrender of Soviet Russia to Imperial Germany at Brest-Litovsk. Still, with the New Economic Policy in full swing in Soviet Russia, with its associated liberalization of culture and trade, the position of the Soviet trade union movement with relationship to social democratic unions in the West was secure and orderly, despite the failure of efforts to parlay with top leaders of the Amsterdam International.

=== RILU in the East ===
As was the case with the Communist International, formal World Congresses of RILU happened with decreasing frequency over the life of the organization. This stands to reason, since RILU World Congresses were scheduled in conjunction with the World Congresses of the Comintern itself, generally launching upon conclusion of the Comintern event. And just as the Comintern began making use of shorter, smaller, and less formal international conventions called "Enlarged Plenums of the Executive Committee" to handle international policy-making, similar gatherings were adopted for RILU, called "Sessions of the Central Council."

The 4th Session of the Central Council, held in Moscow from 9–15 March 1926, began just as the 6th Enlarged Plenum of ECCI came to a close. At both of these gatherings Solomon Lozovsky had delivered reports which identified Great Britain—where a miners' strike was in the air—and in particular the countries of Asia and the Pacific as areas presenting the greatest opportunities for the Profintern in its attempt to construct a world revolutionary movement. Amsterdam had paid scant attention to Asia, leaving the field open to the Profintern's efforts, Lozovsky noted in his report to the Comintern Executive. RILU did make an effort to break new organizational ground outside of Europe as early as February 1922 when it established a Moscow office comparable to the Comintern's Eastern Bureau, headed by Buffalo, New York druggist Boris Reinstein, Bulgarian-American IWW member George Andreytchine, and H. Eiduss. But now, even as European prospects dimmed, the situation looked brighter in Asia and the Pacific.

Best of all, from the perspective of the Profintern, was the situation in China, with a young and radical worker's movement beginning to spring to life. A Profintern representative, Vladimir Abramovich Neiman (commonly known as Nikolsky), attended the 1st National Congress of the Chinese Communist Party. Soviet prestige and influence had grown in China throughout the early 1920s, particularly from 1924, when diplomatic recognition by the Peking government and an agreement on the Chinese Eastern Railroad was achieved. A Chinese labour movement began to take shape, driven by the efforts of railway workers and seamen to organize, backed with Moscow's support. In the South, a breakaway government based in Canton led by Sun Yat-sen pursued anti-imperialist objectives in conjunction with the Chinese Communist Party—an estimated 40 of the 200 delegates at the 20 January 1924 founding convention of the Kuomintang (KMT) were said to be communists and the disciplined and centralized party established at that time clearly drew upon the Soviet Communist model. In June 1924 Sun's KMT government in Canton established its own military academy at Whampoa, aided by 3 million rubles in Soviet aid for the purpose as well as Soviet instructors, headed by Vasily Blyukher.

The working alliance forged between KMT leader Sun and Mikhail Borodin, chief representative of the Comintern in China was lost following Sun's death in Beijing on 12 March 1925. After the leader's death, jockeying began between left and right factions in the KMT; tension between the KMT and the Chinese Communist Party began to build without Sun's calming influence.

On 30 May 1925, a strike in Shanghai of radical students protesting the arrest of some of their fellows who had been supporting a strike at a cotton mill was fired on by police, killing 12 protestors. A general strike was declared in the city in response and a "May 30 Movement" erupted throughout the region. On 19 June, a general strike was called in Canton, followed four days later by another incident in which troops fired upon demonstrators in the streets, resulting in a new spate of casualties.

The rapid growth of the May 30 Movement fueled the Comintern's interest in the revolutionary ferment in China. This new perspective was emphasized by Joseph Stalin, beginning to emerge over the Comintern's Grigory Zinoviev as top leader of the USSR, who in early July 1925 agreed with a reporter for the Tokyo newspaper Nichi Nichi Shimbun that the revolutionary movement in China, India, Persia, Egypt and "other Eastern countries" were growing and that "the time is drawing near when the Western powers will have to bury themselves in the grave they have dug for themselves in the East."

=== Personnel and branches ===
The full-time secretariat of RILU consisted of the Spaniard, Andrés Nin, the Russian trade unionist Mikhail Tomsky and General Secretary Solomon Lozovsky.

In addition to its Moscow headquarters, RILU soon established four overseas offices—Berlin ("Central European Bureau"), Paris ("Latin Bureau"), Bulgaria ("Balkan Bureau") and London ("British Bureau").

In May 1927, the Pan-Pacific Trade Union Secretariat was established in Shanghai as RILU's coordinating center for Asia and the Pacific.

In 1928, RILU launched the Confederación Sindical Latino-Americana (CSLA) as the Latin American branch of RILU—the first general labour movement in Latin America. This group was the forerunner of the Confederación de los Trabajadores de América Latina (CTAL), established in 1936.

The International Trade Union Committee of Negro Workers (ITUCNW) was also founded in 1928 as a section of the Profintern that acted as a radical transnational platform for black workers in Africa and the Atlantic World.

RILU established national sections around the world. In Britain, the Bureau worked closely with the National Minority Movement. The Communist Party of Canada established a national section called the Workers' Unity League. The American section began in 1922 as the Trade Union Educational League, succeeded in 1929 by a more radical variant which attempted to establish dual unions, the Trade Union Unity League.

=== Dissolution ===
The Profintern was dissolved in 1937 as Stalin's foreign policy shifted towards the Popular Front.

== Meetings ==
Gathering	Location	Date	Notes
1st World Congress	Moscow	3–19 July 1921	Establishes RILU. Attended by 380 delegates, 336 with voting rights.
2nd World Congress	Moscow	19 November – 2 December 1922	Formally adopts "united front" policy for the trade union movement.
3rd World Congress	Moscow	8–XX July 1924	Adopts weak and non-binding call for unity congress with Amsterdam International.
4th Session of the Central Council	Moscow	9–15 March 1926	Lozovsky identifies Britain and the East as main areas for Profintern success.
4th World Congress	Moscow	17 March – 3 April 1928	
International Conference on Strike Strategy	Strasbourg, France	January 1929	

== Publications ==
- G. Zinoviev, The Communist Internationale to the IWW: An Appeal of the Executive Committee of the Third Internationale at Moscow. Foreword by Tom Glynn. Melbourne: Proletarian Publishing Association, October 1920.
- Constitution of the Red International of Labour Unions: Adopted at the First World Congress Held in Moscow, July 1921. London: British Bureau, Red International of Labour Unions, 1921.
- J.T. Murphy, The 'Reds' in Congress: Preliminary Report of the First World Congress of the Red International of Trade and Industrial Unions. London: British Bureau, Red International of Labour Unions, 1921.
- Tom Mann, Russia in 1921. British Bureau, Red International of Labour Unions, 1921.
- Resolutions and Decisions of the First International Congress of Revolutionary Trade and Industrial Unions. n.c. [Chicago]: Voice of Labor, 1921.
- "Constitution of the Red International of Labor Unions, as of 2nd World Congress — Nov. 1922." Labor Herald Library no. 6. Chicago: Trade Union Educational League, 1923.
- Resolutions and Decisions of the Second World Congress of the Red International of Labor Unions: Moscow — November 1922. Chicago: Trade Union Educational League, 1923.
- Resolutions and Decisions, RILU, 1923: Resolution on the Report of the Executive Bureau. n.c.: Red International of Labor Unions. Executive Bureau, n.d. [1923?].
- M. Tomsky, The Trade Unions, the Party and the State: Extracts of Speeches by Comrade Tomsky at the III Session of the Profintern on June 29, 1923, and... Moscow: Commission for Foreign Relations of the Central Council of Trade Unions of the USSR, 1927.
- A. Lozovsky, What is the Red International of Labor Unions? Red International of Labor Unions, 1927.
- Problems of Strike Strategy: Decisions of the International Conference on Strike Strategy, held in Strassburg, Germany, January 1929 New York: Workers Library Publishers, 1929.

== See also ==
- National Minority Movement
- Revolutionäre Gewerkschafts Opposition
- Trade Union Educational League
- Trade Union Unity League
