= Isabelo de los Reyes =

Filipino writer, labor leader and church founder

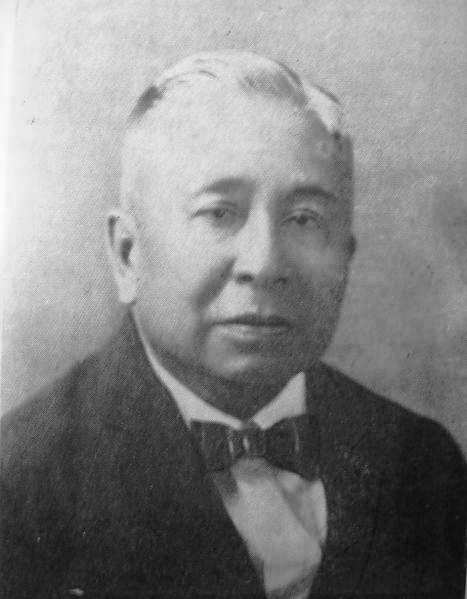

Honorary Bishop of the Philippine Independent Church
- In office 1929–1938

Senator of the Philippines from the 1st district
- In office 1922–1928 Serving with Santiago Fonacier (1922–1925), Elpidio Quirino (1925–1928)
- Preceded by: Vicente Singson Encarnacion
- Succeeded by: Melecio Arranz

Member of the Manila Municipal Board
- In office 1912–1919

3rd and 9th Vice Mayor of Manila
- In office August 7, 1909 – August 7, 1911
- Mayor: Félix M. Roxas
- Preceded by: Ramón J. Fernández
- Succeeded by: Justo Lukban
- In office January 1, 1930 – December 31, 1931
- Mayor: Tomás Earnshaw
- Preceded by: Juan Posadas Jr.
- Succeeded by: Jorge B. Vargas

President of the Union Obrera Democratica
- In office 1902–1902
- Succeeded by: Dominador Gómez

Personal details
- Born: Isabelo de los Reyes y Florentino; July 7, 1864 Vigan, Ilocos Sur, Captaincy General of the Philippines
- Died: October 10, 1938 (aged 74) Manila, Philippine Commonwealth
- Resting place: María Clara Parish Church, Santa Cruz, Manila
- Party: Nacionalista
- Other political affiliations: Republican
- Spouse(s): Josefa Sevilla; María Ángeles López Montero; María Lim
- Children: 27, including Isabelo Jr.
- Parents: Elias de los Reyes (father); Leona Florentino (mother)
- Education: Colegio de San Juan de Letran; University of Santo Tomas
- Occupation: Politician, labor leader, lay leader, theologian
- Profession: Writer, journalist
- Known for: Proclaiming the establishment of the Philippine Independent Church (Iglesia Filipina Independiente)
- Nickname: Don Belong

Isabelo de los Reyes y Florentino, also known as Don Belong (July 7, 1864 – October 10, 1938), was a prominent Filipino patriot, politician, writer, journalist, and labor activist in the 19th and 20th centuries. He was the original founder and proclaimer of the Iglesia Filipina Independiente, the first-ever Filipino independent Christian Church in history in the form of a nationalist church, which was proclaimed in 1902. He was also the founder and first president of the first-ever labor union federation in the Philippines, the Unión Obrera Democrática. He is popularly known today as the "Father of Philippine Folklore", the "Father of the Philippine Labor Movement", and the "Father of Filipino Socialism".

As a young man, de los Reyes followed his mother's footsteps by initially turning to writing as a career; his works were part of the 1887 Exposicion General de las Islas Filipinas in Madrid. He later became a journalist, editor, and publisher in Manila, and was imprisoned in 1897 for revolutionary activities. He was deported to the Kingdom of Spain, where he was jailed for his activities until 1898. While living and working in Madrid, he was influenced by the writings of European socialists and Marxists.

Returning to the Philippines in 1901, de los Reyes founded the first modern trade union federation in the country in 1902. He also was active in seeking independence from the United States. After serving in the Philippine Senate in the 1920s, he settled into private life and religious writing. De los Reyes wrote on diverse topics in history, folklore, language, politics, and religion. He had a total of 27 children with three successive wives from getting widowed each time; he survived all his wives.

== Early life and education ==
Isabelo de los Reyes was born to Leona Florentino and Elías de los Reyes in Vigan, Ilocos Sur and baptized as Roman Catholic. His mother, who was of mixed Spanish and Filipino descent and forced in marriage at the age of 14, is recognized as the first significant female poet of the Philippines for her works in both Spanish and Ilocano and is recognized as the "mother of Philippine women's literature" and a pioneer in Philippine lesbian literature. De los Reyes may have been distantly related to Ventura de los Reyes, a creole merchant who was the first Philippine delegate to the Spanish Cortes through his father's side. He may also have been a "distant cousin" of José Rizal through a Chinese tax collector married to both Rizal's grandmother and de los Reyes' grand-aunt.

Elías and his children shunned Leona away from the family due to her progressive feminist and pro-equality ideals, which were viewed negatively under the Spanish colonial patriarchy. This left Isabelo without a mother as Elías entrusted his six-year-old son to the care of Don Marcelino Crisólogo, a wealthy relative who was also a writer in the vernacular. Crisólogo was married to Felipa Florentino, sister to Leona. Beluco, as he was called in his youth, was enrolled in a grammar school attached to the local seminary run by Augustinians (Seminario de Vigan); their harsh discipline made him a lifelong critic of friars. De los Reyes was a free spirit and chafed against seminary life. Once, he led a student strike against the friars to protest the maltreatment of students. His stay in the Vigan Seminary helped him develop a fascination for legends, music, songs, and Ilocano traditions.

In 1880 at age 16, de los Reyes went to Manila without his uncle's consent, where he finished Bachiller en Artes at the Colegio de San Juan de Letran. After that, he studied the Civil Code, Penal Code, the Mercantile Code, judicial proceedings and drafting documents, palaeography, and anthropology at the Pontifical and Royal University of Santo Tomas. It was in Santo Tomas where he first met Gregorio Aglipay.

== Early career and journalism ==
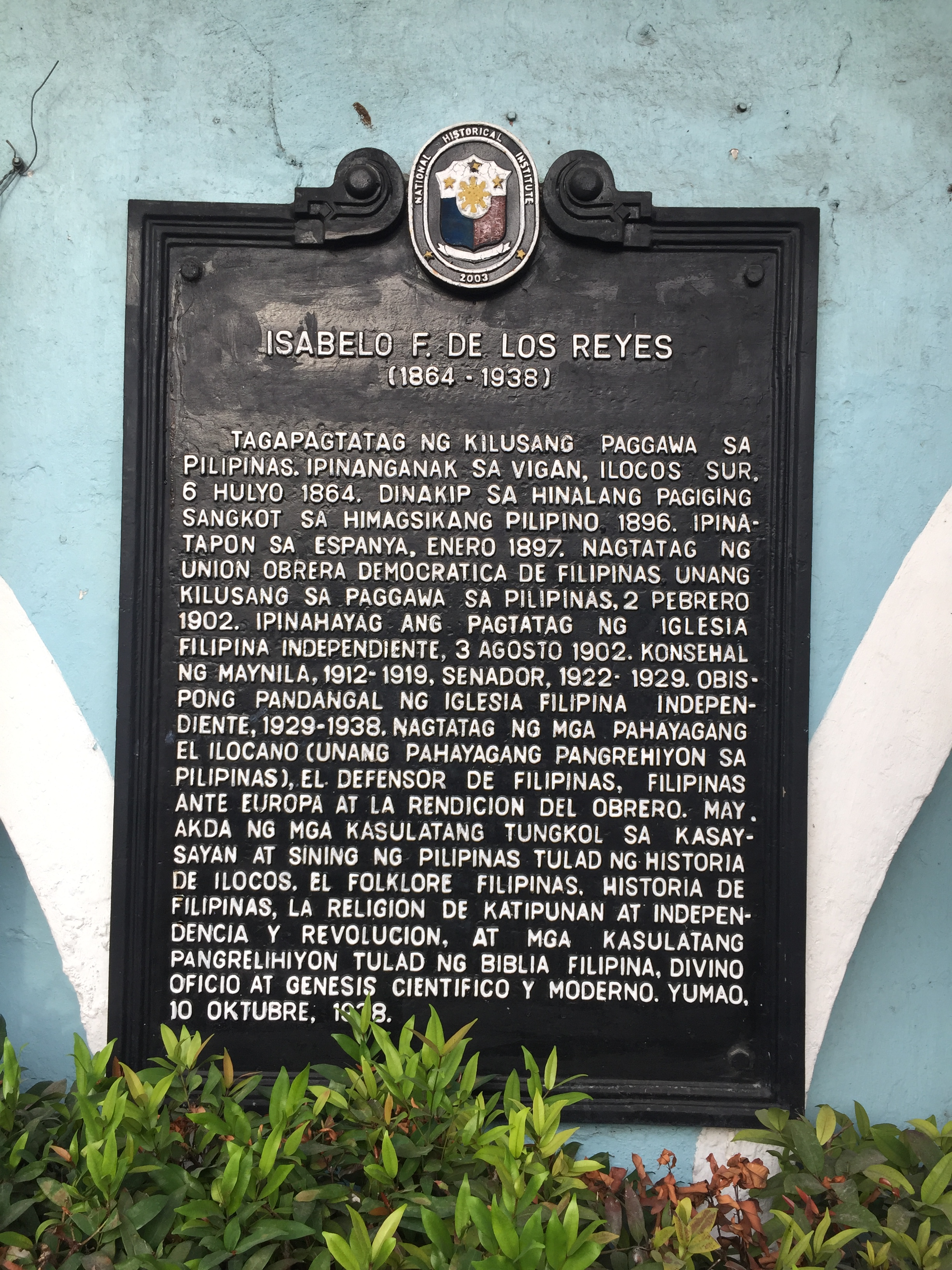
Historical marker in honor of de los Reyes in Vigan, owned by the National Historical Commission of the Philippines (NHCP).

While studying in the Colegio de San Juan de Letran, he supplemented his allowance by taking to journalism, setting type for La Oceana Española as well as writing for periodicals such as Diario de Manila, El Comercio, La Revista Popular, and La Opinion. In November 1882, his work, La expedicion de Li-Ma-Hong contra Filipinas was published in Diario de Manila and garnered him a prize.

His father Elias died in 1883, thus allowing him to visit his feminist mother Leona Florentino for the first time in around 14 years. Isabelo, who was around aged 20 at the time, reconnected ties with his mother, who was suffering from tuberculoses at the time. Leona died the following year on October 4, 1884 and was buried in Vigan Cathedral. Despite the limited time they had, Leona had made a solid impact and influence towards Isabelo, which led Isabelo to a literary career. Leona is also credited for Isabelo's progressing views towards democracy, Philippine sovereignty, and equality by the era's standards, which later on marshalled to his support for Philippine revolution, women's right to university education, and women's right to suffrage as an adult.

Ever since he was young, de los Reyes had been intrigued by the growing interest in the "new science" of El saber popular (folklore). On March 25, 1884, Jose Felipe Del Pan wrote an article in La Oceania Filipina calling readers to contribute folklore articles, inspired by interest in the subject in the peninsula. De los Reyes was urged by del Pan to contribute and gave him books on the subject that piqued his interest. Two months later, de los Reyes submitted his articles concerning the folklore of Ilocos, Malabon, and Zambales.

In 1886, de los Reyes worked as Manila correspondent for El Eco de Panay, a newspaper in Iloilo, but was replaced by Wenceslao Retana when his reports began to appear too liberal. His reputation as an independent-minded writer was such that in 1887, La Opinion hired him as a foil for their ultra-conservative staff writer, Camilo Millan.

In 1884, de los Reyes was married to Josefa Hizon Sevilla, his first wife. Sevilla was the daughter of Gregorio Sevilla, the capitan of Malabon. Shortly after, the couple started a pawnshop, which failed. They also opened a bookstore, which similarly failed because de los Reyes "refused to sell the good ones". Eventually, they were able to build a modest fortune as a commercial agent of rice, tobacco, indigo, and other products.

In 1887, at the age of 23, del Pan compiled de los Reyes' articles and submitted them to the Exposición General de las Islas Filipinas in Madrid, where he won a silver medal. These articles would eventually become one of his most important contributions to Philippine studies, El Folk-lore Filipino. Folk-Lore was published in 1889 in two volumes. De los Reyes' interest in folklore continued. He collected materials, wrote for periodicals, and issued an open letter calling on readers to collect, publish, and organize a folklore society, which did not materialize. De los Reyes wrote Folk-Lore not just as a book for legends and fables, but eventually as "a general archive at the service of all sciences", expanding his definition of "folklore" to include "popular knowledge relevant to all sciences", including sections on religion, customs, literature, and articles on Diego Silang, millenarian revolts, and local miracles of the Virgin Mary.

During this time, Isabelo de los Reyes also propagated the literary works of his mother Leona, notably her poems. Despite Leona's many works, only 22 surviving literary contributions, as many of which were destroyed by either time or her husband, were posthumously presented at the Exposicion General de Filipinas in Madrid in 1887 three years after her death. They were again presented at the International Exposicion in Paris in 1889 and at the St. Louis International Exposition in Missouri in 1904. They were also included in the Encyclopedia Internationale des Oeuvres des Femmes (International Encyclopedia of Women's Works) in 1889. Because of these publications, Isabelo ensured that his mother's writing would be known even outside the country and preserved through time, something that was thought to be impossible for his mother, who was a vocal lesbian woman, given the patriarchal nature of the Spanish colonial era.

De los Reyes also published in rapid succession multiple works: Ilocandias (1887), Articulos Varios (1887), Las Islas Visayas en la epoca de la conquista (1889), Historia de Filipinas (1889), and the two-volume Historia de Ilocos (1890). These and other works won him a measure of recognition as a scholar. By 1889, he was listed as a corresponding or honorary member of societies such as the Imperial y Real Sociedad Geografica de Vienna, Academia Indo-China de Francia, and the Sociedad Española de Geografia Comercial.

In 1889 he founded El Ilocano, said to be the first newspaper written solely in a Philippine vernacular. De los Reyes declared that he founded El Ilocano to "serve [our] beloved pueblo Ilocos by contributing to the enlightenment of her children, defending her interests." El Iloco lasted for seven years. By 1893, de los Reyes was able to acquire his own printing press, which he set up in the basement of his house in Binondo and called Imprenta de Isabelo de los Reyes. Proud of his provincial origins, he boasted that the press parts were fabricated by Vigan artisans and he hired Ilocanos as printshop personnel.

Aside from El Ilocano, de los Reyes also published the periodicals La Lectura Popular (1890–1892), a Tagalog biweekly joint venture with Jose de Jesus, and El Minicipio Filipino (1894), a short-lived Spanish-Tagalog magazine devoted to colonial jurisprudence.

== Imprisonment and exile ==
As the Philippine Revolution of 1896 began, multiple personalities suspected of being a part of it were arrested by the Spanish government. One of these people was de los Reyes, who at the time, openly advocated reforms, and if necessary, "take up arms against the tyrants".

De los Reyes was arrested on February 12, 1897, and taken to Bilibid Prison. He was charged with membership in La Liga Filipina, the political organization organized by Rizal, as well as being knowledgeable of the Katipunan, however, he denied all of this. De los Reyes, however, sold types to Emilio Jacinto for the Katipunan's printing press, and he later claimed that he made a financial contribution to the Liga. De los Reyes also claimed that while he declined when Julio Nakpil asked him to join the Liga, he offered to give Nakpil a thousand pesos to purchase revolvers from someone on board the steamer Salvadora, and that he offered his services as a soldier.

In Bilibid, de los Reyes wrote his Memorial sobre la revolution, which initially was the Memoria de agravios de los Filipinos. The document was addressed to the Governor-General, Fernando Primo de Rivera and was meant to gain sympathy for the rebels. His Memoria pointed out that the friars sowed the seeds of colonial revolt in the Philippines. De los Reyes' wife, Josefa, died while he was in prison. When his son, Jose, broke the news to him, de los Reyes wept unabashedly. He was permitted to attend his wife's funeral.

De los Reyes was pardoned on May 17, the King's birthday, but was arrested again shortly after complaining about the injustice of his arrest and reminding the governor-general of the Memoria that he sent. De los Reyes was deported aboard the SS Alicante in June 1897, and was interred at the Montjuïc Castle in Barcelona for six months, before being released as part of the terms of the Pact of Biak-na-Bato.

=== Exile in Spain ===
During his time in Montjuïc, de los Reyes read works by anarchists and syndicalists who influenced his thought. A sympathetic guard supplied him with anarchist books and newspapers. De los Reyes also met Ramon Sempau, a Spanish poet-journalist who left an impression on de los Reyes.

After his release in 1898, de los Reyes was barred from leaving Spain and became a drifter in Barcelona. It was during this time that he came to know radicals such as Francisco Ferrer, Alejandro Lerroux, and others. He began reading the works of Pierre-Joseph Proudhon, Mikhail Bakunin, and other socialist thinkers. He also joined protest actions and was imprisoned for a short time by police authorities. He was released and was forced to relocate from Barcelona to Madrid.

During his time in Madrid, he was taken in by Doña Justa Jugo Vidal and met with other Filipinos to discuss the Philippine situation. He also met Señorita María Ángeles López Montero and married her on Christmas Eve in 1898. He published La Religion del Katipunan, which he wrote during his stay in Montjuïc, and he was commissioned by the British and Foreign Bible Society to translate the Bible to Iloko. De los Reyes later said that this work was "one way by which [he] could contribute to the liberalization of dogmatic religion."

At the onset of the Spanish–American War, de los Reyes was employed as Counselor of the Ministry of the Colonies (Consejero del Ministerio de Ultramar), which he held until 1901. In this capacity, de los Reyes helped rally Filipino support against the Americans, thinking that this would create conditions favorable to the Philippines. He believed that once the Americans were repelled, they would be granted autonomy, and should Spain renege, then the already armed Filipinos could take matters to their own hands. He had received assurances from the governor-general Basilio Augustín regarding autonomy, and together with other Filipinos in Spain, offered to return to the Philippines to organize militias to fight the Americans.

De los Reyes wrote anti-American articles for La Correspondencia de Epaña and other papers. On November 10, 1898, as Spain's loss of the Philippines became imminent, he and Dominador Gómez published Filipinas ante Europa, which had the editorial logo: Contra Norte-America, no; contra el imperialismo, sí, hasta la muerte! (Against the Americans, no; against Imperialism, yes, until death!) It ran for 86 issues between October 25, 1899, and June 10, 1901. After closing, it briefly reappeared as El Defensor de Filipinas, which ran monthly from July 1 to October 1, 1901.

After Aguinaldo's surrender, de los Reyes was repatriated to Manila on July 1, 1901. Given guarantees by the American consul in Barcelona that he will not be harassed upon his arrival in the Philippines, he left Spain on September 14 aboard the steamer Montevideo. De los Reyes arrived in Manila on October 15, 1901.

== Return to the Philippines ==
On his return, de los Reyes quickly set about to launching several initiatives that he already had in mind while still in Spain. On October 25, 1901, ten days after he returned to Manila, he sought authority from the Philippine Commission to publish his Defensor de Filipinas, which was refused. On October 31, he appeared before the commission, with Pedro Paterno and Pascual H. Poblete to seek permission to form a political party, the Partido Nacionalista, which was also denied. He wanted to push for a party that would push for independence within the framework of US occupation. Eventually, Poblete persistently managed to form the short-lived Partido Nacionalista (predecessor of the Nacionalista Party), which de los Reyes had also joined. He was eventually named its leader.

In tandem with party building, de los Reyes also set about organizing a workers' movement in the Philippines. In 1901 to 1902, Hermenegildo Cruz and other members of the Carmelo and Bauermann publishing house approached de los Reyes to seek advice in forming a cooperative store for rice and other staples. The Union Democratica de Litografos, Impresores, Encuadernadores y Otros Obreros was thus formed, which came to be known as the labor union federation Union Obrera Democratica (UOD) on February 2, 1902. De los Reyes was its first president.

De los Reyes took home with him works by socialists such as Karl Marx, Proudhon, Bakunin, and Errico Malatesta. Malatesta's Propaganda socialista fra contadini was particularly familiar to union organizers. The UOD was the first labor union federation in the Philippines, soon being joined by neighborhood associations from Cavite, Quiapo, Santa Cruz and Sampaloc; company guilds from the San Miguel Brewery and L.R. Yangco Shipping Company; and trade associations of printers, tabaqueros, tailors, sculptors, seamen, and cooks. At its peak in 1903, the UOD's membership was estimated at twenty thousand.

As conceived by de los Reyes, the UOD's aim was to "achieve the longed-for alliance between capital and labor" by bringing together workers and employers in a spirit of friendship, mutual respect, and recognized interdependence. De los Reyes also wished to enlighten the masses as a prerequisite to modern nationhood. In this end, he organized veladas instructivo-recreativas as a way to "improve themselves and learn the life of cultured peoples". He had observed that workers in Europe had clubs and cafes where they could read newspapers and discuss current events, and wished to emulate that in the Philippines. De los Reyes also published the UOD's official organ, La Redencion del Obrero.

De los Reyes spent this time mediating in labor disputes and other union-organizing activities. The press at this time called him a "Malay Lerroux" and compared him to Spanish labor leader Pablo Iglesias. On August 17, 1902, he was arrested on the trumped-up charge that he gave orders to assassinate scabs in a strike at the Commercial Tobacco Factory. De los Reyes was eventually released on January 30, 1903, by Governor William Howard Taft, stating that the statute "was not in line with current American thinking on the subject" and was given the condition that he would henceforth shy away from labor organizations. While in prison, de los Reyes tendered his resignation from the UOD on September 14, 1902, and was later replaced by Dominador Gómez.

After leaving the UOD, de los Reyes tried to patch up internal rivalries within the organization but ultimately failed. The UOD was dissolved and in its place was the Unión del Trabajo de Filipinas, headed by writer Lope K. Santos. After this, de los Reyes focused on his Redencion del Obrero while contributing to papers like El Comercio, Grito del Pueblo, and others. He took up causes such as labor rights, universal suffrage, the exclusion of Chinese immigrant labor, and parity of Filipinos and Americans in the civil service. The right of women to suffrage was an important advocacy of Isabelo during his adult life.

== Japan, Hong Kong, and return to Spain ==
De los Reyes left the Philippines in February 1903 for a vacation, going to Japan and Hong Kong. He also sought to continue his translation of the bible and to oversee its printing in Yokohama, although others suggest that his true purpose was to meet with Filipino revolutionary general Artemio Ricarte, who was in exile at the time. Details are unclear whether de los Reyes met with Ricarte in Yokohama or in Hong Kong, although it was certain that a meeting took place between the two in Manila. De los Reyes relayed to him the Philippine situation and tried to dissuade him from resuming hostilities with the US.

In 1905, de los Reyes once again left for Spain where he stayed until 1909. During this time, he worked as a juror in Barcelona until 1908. He also went back to mend relations with his wife, María Ángeles López Montero, who repeatedly urged him to stay away from politics. During his stay in Spain, he wrote texts such as Gregorio Aglipay y otros prelados de la Iglesia Filipina Independiente (1906) and Biblia Filipina. He also published La Religion Antigua de Filipinas (1909).

De los Reyes returned to Manila on April 3, 1909, with Lopez, however she could not adjust to the climate. After a few months, he brought her to Tokyo to recuperate. Lopez died on February 10, 1910, while giving birth to twin daughters.

== Later years and death ==
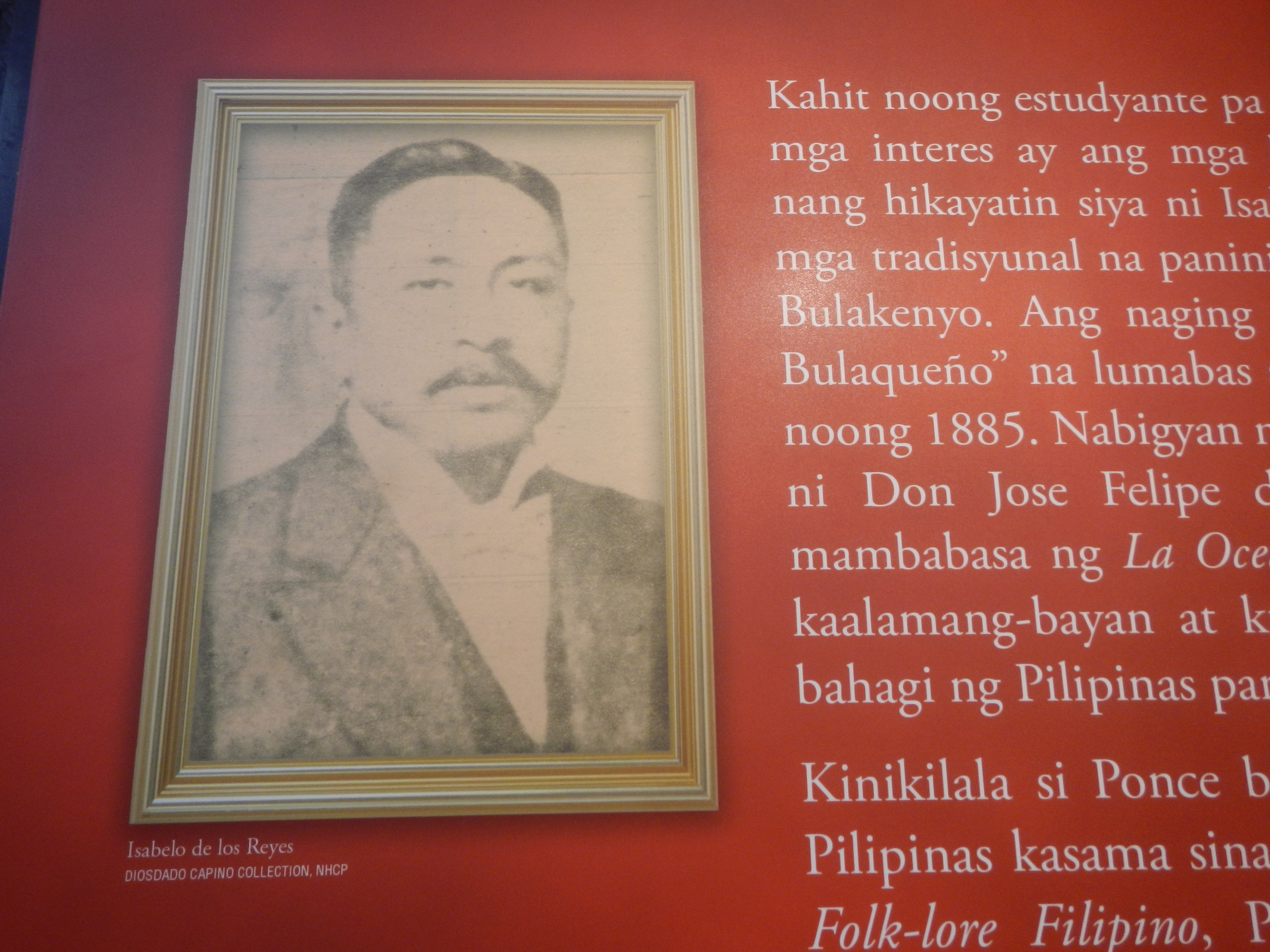
Portrait of de los Reyes at a National Historical Commission of the Philippines museum in Baliuag, Bulacan.

In 1912 at the age of 48, de los Reyes was elected a board member (councilor) of Manila, and began his political career. Winning re-election, he served until 1919. He ran as a candidate for the labor-based group called the Union Reformista. As board member, he worked on social welfare ordinances, pushed for "Filipinization" of the civil service, and filed resolutions urging immediate and absolute independence of the Philippines.

De los Reyes also met and married María Lim, a mestiza de sangley from Tondo. They married in the independent Aglipayan Church, which de los Reyes had helped found. She would eventually die in childbirth in 1923. As she was dying, she asked de los Reyes that they be married in the Roman Catholic rite, to which he agreed.

Beginning his campaign for the senate in 1921, in 1922, de los Reyes won a Senate seat in an election serving alongside Santiago Fonacier, and later with Elpidio Quirino, to represent the First Senatorial District. As senator, he brokered projects, appointments, and other forms of patronage for his constituents. He was known for crying out "Enough of this nonsense!" whenever he was exasperated with debates on the Senate floor.

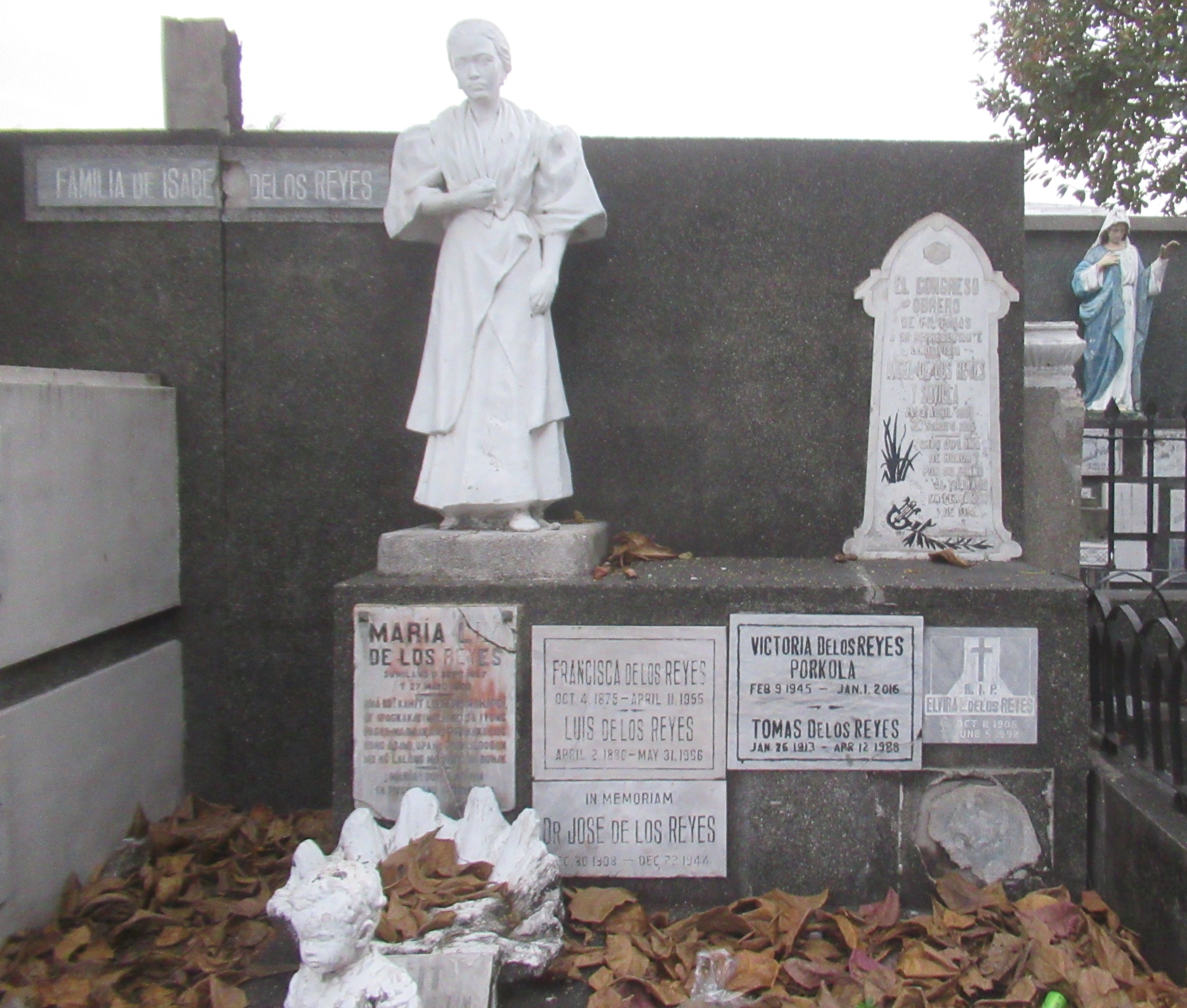
Family grave of the rest of the de los Reyes family at the Manila North Cemetery.

De los Reyes suffered a stroke which left him paralyzed and bedridden on June 5, 1929. He retired from politics after a short stint as appointive vice mayor of Manila from 1930 to 1931. He devoted his time to compiling Aglipayan texts and largely slipped out of public notice. A frail de los Reyes' last foray into politics was when he ran in the 1935 Philippine legislative elections, losing badly.

De los Reyes died on October 10, 1938, in a Manila hospital leaving behind 15 of his remaining and surviving children. A legal battle between his children regarding his custody ensued during the last years of his life. De los Reyes executed a document of retraction from his Aglipayan faith on September 14, 1936, two years before his death, as attested by some of his Roman Catholic daughters, although the authenticity of the so-called metanoia was vehemently contested by other family members asserting that de los Reyes no longer had full control of his faculties that time due to deteriorating health and old age. It is not known whether he retracted his Aglipayan beliefs and died a Catholic. He had both funeral blessings from Gregorio Aglipay at the Funeraria Nacional, Manila and then according to Roman Catholic rites at the San Sebastian Church, Manila. His body was initially interred at the Manila North Cemetery before being transferred to the former location of the Iglesia Filipina Independiente National Cathedral in Tondo, Manila in 1944, on order of his son, Isabelo Jr. However, after the World War II, his remains were permanently transferred to the María Clara Parish Church of the Iglesia Filipina Independiente in Sta. Cruz, Manila.

The Isabelo de los Reyes Elementary School in Tondo, Manila was named after his honor.

== Philippine Independent Church ==
Albeit an anti-friar, de los Reyes was a very religious person. De los Reyes was involved with the secular Filipino clergy as early as 1899, when he became a part of negotiations with the Holy See. On January 22, 1899, de los Reyes, representing the "Committee of Paris", visited the Papal Nuncio Giuseppe Francica-Nava de Bontifè in Madrid to convey the Aguinaldo government's desire for the Holy See to send a delegate to look into the conditions of the Philippines. However, de los Reyes discerned that the Holy See was more inclined to listen to the Spanish friars. De los Reyes wrote in Filipinas Ante Europa:

Enough of Rome! Let us now form without vacillation our own congregation, a Filipino Church, conserving all that is good in the Roman Church and eliminating all the deceptions which the diabolical astuteness of the cunning Romanists had introduced to corrupt the moral purity and sacredness of the doctrines of Christ...

On his return to the Philippines in 1901, de los Reyes campaigned for the establishment of a Filipino Church independent from the authority of the Roman Catholic Church. On August 3, 1902, with the help of Pascual H. Poblete and other members of the UOD, the Iglesia Filipina Independiente (Philippine Independent Church or also known as the Aglipayan Church) was formed, with Gregorio Aglipay, an excommunicated priest from the Roman Catholic Church, as its proposed head (albeit in absentia). At the time, Aglipay was in talks with the Protestants and the Jesuits to prevent a schism, though neither of these events bore fruit. Aglipay initially dissociated himself from the schism, before realizing the futility of staying outside it. In September 1902, he accepted de los Reyes' offer for the position of Obispo Maximo (Supreme Bishop) and subsequently got consecrated to episcopacy and in turn, also consecrated some other bishops for the new church.

De los Reyes, who was also later excommunicated formally by the Roman Catholic Church as a schismatic apostate, traveled all over the country to rally people to the new church. He also directed the Church publications Boletin de la Iglesia Filipina Independiente and La Iglesia Filipina Independiente: Revista Catolica. He also turned his residence into a temporary seminary. In 1929, de los Reyes was appointed an honorary bishop, a position he held until his death. In this capacity, he wrote multiple devotional and doctrinal texts such as the Biblia Filipina, Oficio Divino, Catequesis, Plegarias, Genesis Cientifico y Moderno and the Calendario Aglipayano.

== Marriage and family ==
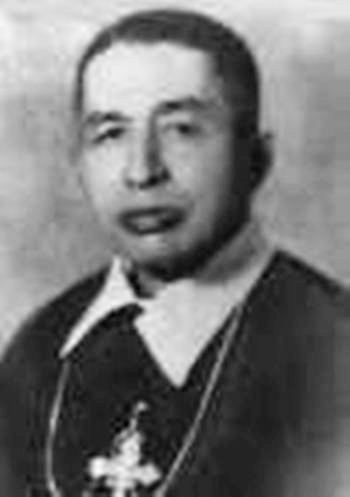
Isabelo Valentin "Beluco" L. de los Reyes Jr., son of Isabelo Sr.

In 1884, at the age of 20, de los Reyes married Josefa Sevilla, the daughter of Gregorio Sevilla, the capitan of Malabon. He and his wife had ten children. His wife died of illness in 1897 while he was in Bilibid prison.

In late December 1898, he married María Ángeles López Montero (the daughter of a retired Spanish infantry colonel) in Madrid, also in a Roman Catholic ceremony. She died in 1910 while giving birth to their ninth child.

De los Reyes' last marriage in 1912 was to the 18-year-old María Lim, a mestiza de sangley from Tondo. They married in the independent Aglipayan Church. They also had several children before María also died in childbirth in 1923. Before her death, she had asked that they be married according to the Roman Catholic rite, to which de los Reyes agreed.

With his own family spanning Roman Catholic and Aglipayan traditions, de los Reyes was tolerant of religious diversity among his children. His namesake Isabelo de los Reyes Jr. (1900–1971), a son from his second marriage with Lopez and whom he shares the same death day with at October 10, although baptized Roman Catholic, was ordained an Aglipayan priest and later became Obispo Máximo IV of the Church for 25 years. De los Reyes Jr. is also widely known as the "Father of Ecumenism in the Philippines". His daughters Ángeles, Elisa, and Elvira also from his second marriage, along with Crescencia from his third marriage, became professed nuns in the Roman Catholic Church.

De los Reyes was married and widowed three times, siring a total of 27 children. He survived all his wives.

== Works and writings ==
Throughout his life, Isabelo de los Reyes wrote and published multiple works in various subjects, such as history, folklore, politics, and religion. He used Spanish, Tagalog, and Ilokano in his writings. De los Reyes also published multiple newspapers.

He wrote critically of the Spanish and American colonial governments in the Philippines.

=== Publications ===
- El Ilocano
- La Lectura Popular
- El Municipio Filipino
- Filipinas ante Europa
- El Defensor de Filipinas
- La Redencion del Obrero
- Boletin de la Iglesia Filipina Independiente
- La Iglesia Filipina Independiente: Revista Catolica

=== Scholarly works and essays ===
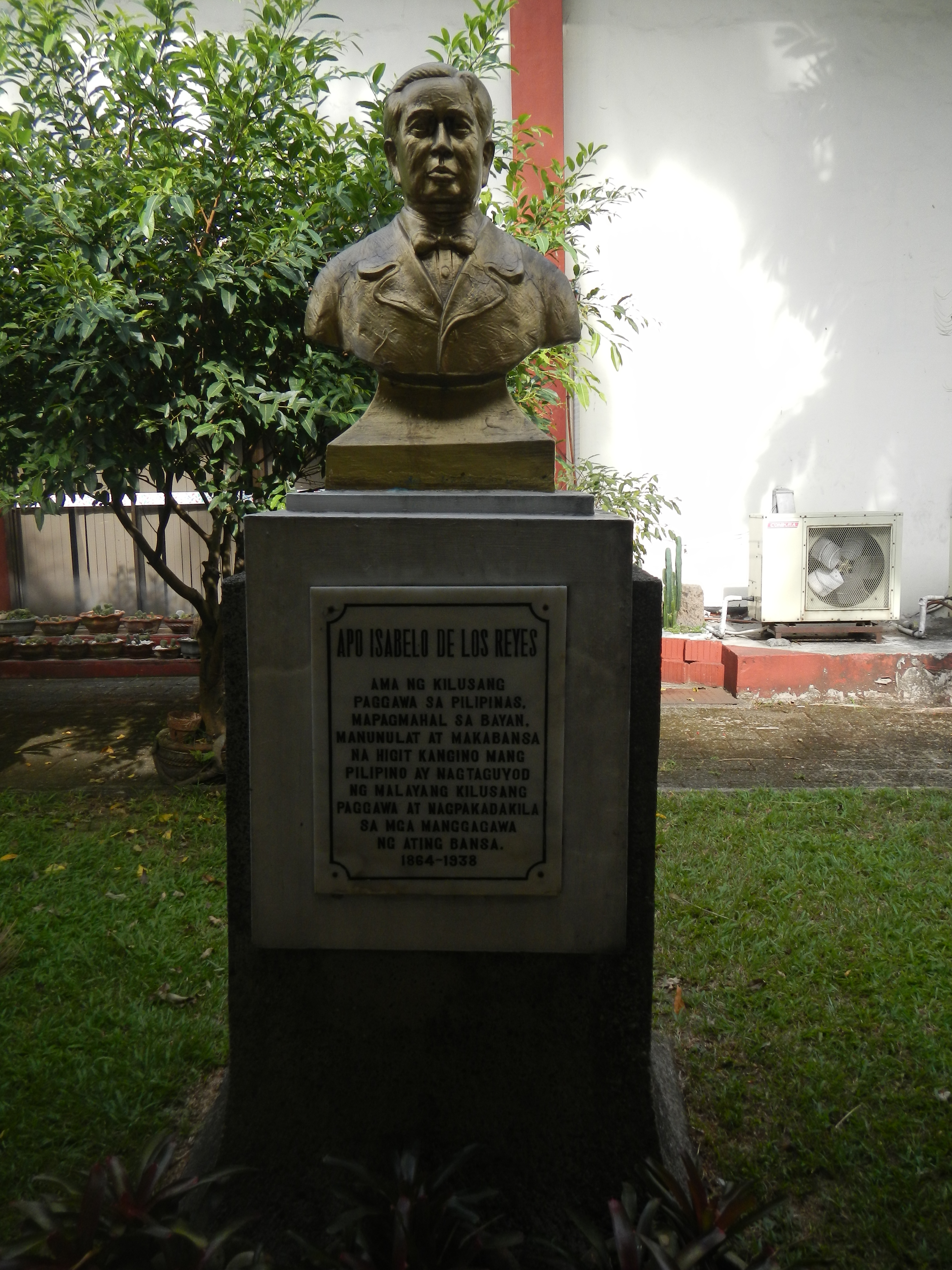
Bust of de los Reyes situated at the University of the Philippines School of Labor and Industrial Relations in UP Diliman.

- El Folk-lore Filipino
- La expedicion de Li-Ma-Hong contra Filipinas
- Ilocandias
- Articulos Varios
- Las Islas Visayas en la epoca de la conquista
- Historia de Filipinas
- Historia de Ilocos
- Memoria sobre la revolution
- Memoria de agravios de los Filipinos
- Kalendariong Maanghang
- La Religion Antigua de Filipinas

=== Novels and stories ===
- Mariquit the Tramp
- Sing sing ni Diego
- Ang Singsing ng Dalagang Marmol (circa 1905), a novel

=== Religious texts ===
- Gregorio Aglipay y otros prelados de la Iglesia Filipina Independiente
- Biblia Filipina
- Oficio Divino
- Catequesis
- Plegarias
- Genesis Cientifico y Moderno
- Calendario Aglipayano

He also translated into Iloko the Gospels of the New Testament and the Acts of the Apostles.

Senate of the Philippines
Preceded by Vicente Singson Encarnación	Senator of the Philippines from the 1st district 1922–1928; Served alongside: Santiago Fonacier (1922–1925); Elpidio Quirino (1925–1935)	Succeeded by Melecio Arranz
Political offices
Preceded by Ramón J. Fernández; Juan Posadas Jr.	Vice Mayor of Manila; 1907–1911; 1930–1931	Succeeded by Justo Lukban; Jorge B. Vargas
