= Hall Auditorium =

Ohio campus performing arts building

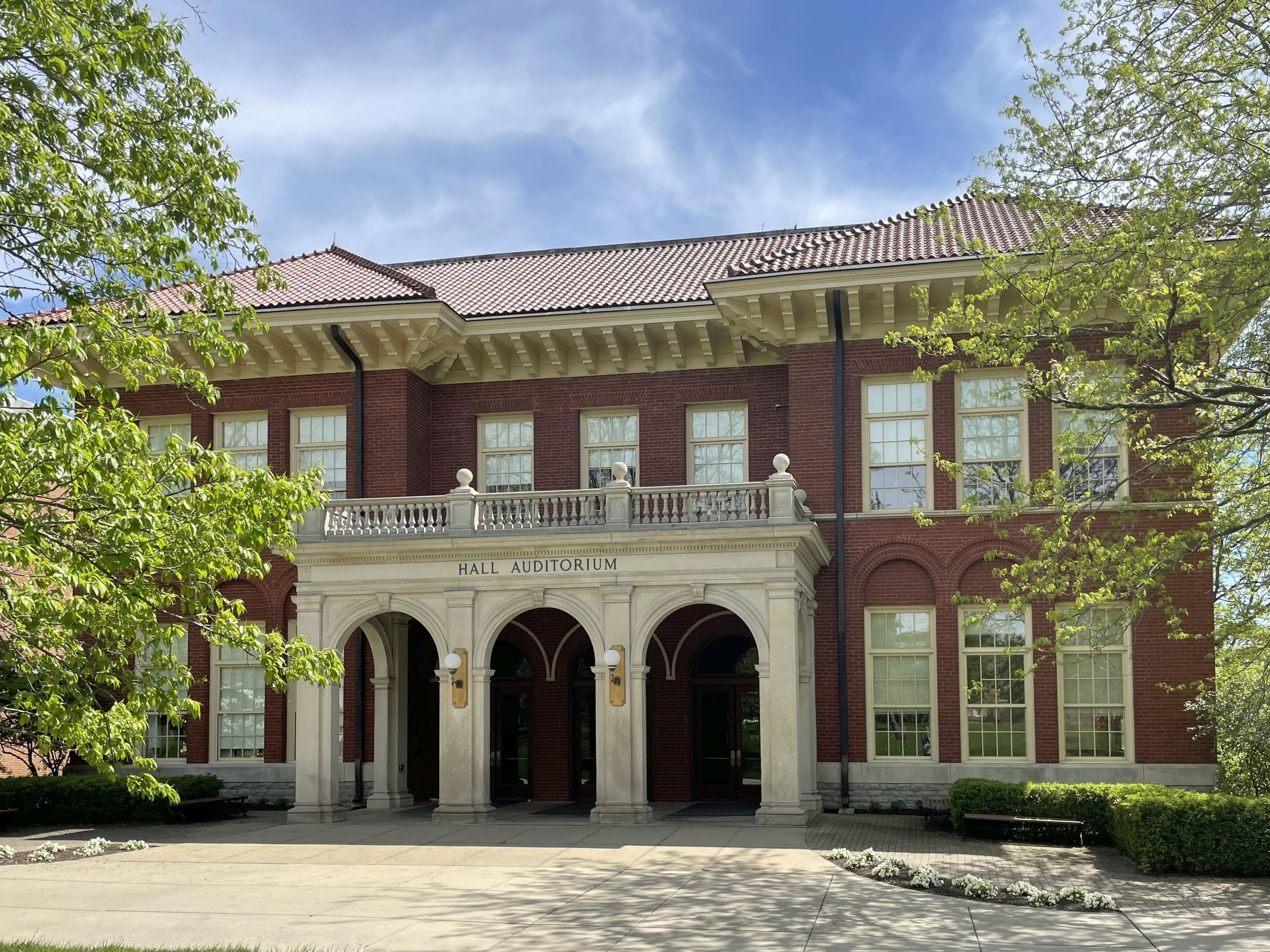
- Hall Auditorium in May 2022

- Location within Ohio Location within the United States

General information
- Architectural style: Georgian
- Location: Miami University campus, Oxford, Ohio
- Coordinates: 39°30′32.04″N 84°44′18.71″W
- Completed: 1908
- Renovated: 1991-1993

Design and construction
- Architect: G.W. Drach

Hall Auditorium is an auditorium and classroom building on the campus of Miami University in Oxford, Ohio. Originally known simply as the Miami University Auditorium Building, it was renamed Benton Hall in 1926 after Guy Potter Benton, Miami's twelfth president, and renamed again for Miami's fifth president John W. Hall in 1969, when the university transferred Benton Hall's name to a new building. Hall Auditorium is the 3rd oldest building on Miami's campus proper, after Elliott and Stoddard Halls, built in 1820 and 1836. The building hosts concerts from university and outside groups, guest speakers, and other performances. Miami's philosophy department occupies the 2nd floor of the building, while the school's Performing Arts Series has office space in the main lobby.

== Construction and planning ==
The Miami University Auditorium Building was built in 1907–08 on Miami University's campus, and was also known as the Administration Building. It was officially named Benton Hall in 1926 after Miami's twelfth president, Guy Potter Benton. Benton Hall also contained administrative offices, including the offices of the president, dean, and business manager on the second floor with the registrar, YMCA and The Miami Student holding office space on the main floor.

Benton Hall was the principal assembly hall for graduations and commencements until 1932 when Withrow Court became the location of the major convocations and performing arts programs. The construction of the new administrative building (Roudebush Hall) was completed in 1956, and the Music Department moved to Benton Hall in place of the administrative offices.

Since 1956, the building has contained the music department including the Performing Arts Series Office and the Philosophy Department.

In the 1960s, there were purportedly plans to demolish the building due to an imminent expansion of Miami's King Library, so the Benton name was moved to the behavioral sciences building that had recently been built. In 1969, the planned razing did not occur, and the building was renamed Hall Auditorium in honor of Miami's fifth president, John W. Hall.

== Renovations ==
The building was renovated from 1991 to 1993. It was a five and a half million dollar project that gutted the entire building, and only left one interior support wall, the floor on the ground level, and the woodwork and wood flooring in the lobby. Contractors removed the south end in order to double the size of the stage to improve the acoustics and sight. This reduced the capacity from 1,200 to 735, its current capacity. This is Miami's second largest auditorium, only smaller than Millett Hall. The designers added new lighting and state of the art sound systems. They decided to renovate because, according to Holly Wissing, Miami's spokesperson in 1993, the hall had become old and the acoustics needed to be improved. There was a grand opening performance by the Echternach Festival Orchestra.

== Guy Potter Benton ==
What was previously known as Benton Hall was dedicated for Guy Potter Benton, who was president of Miami from 1902 until 1911. Benton was born in Kenton, Ohio on May 26, 1865. He received an A.B. degree from Baker University in 1886 and Ohio Wesleyan University that same year. He also received an A.M. degree from Baker in 1896 and Ohio Wesleyan in 1905; D.D. degree from Baker in 1900 and Ohio Wesleyan in 1905; LL.D. degree from Upper Iowa University in 1906 and Miami in 1916. He also went to the University of Wooster for graduate school. Benton was a licensed minister of the Methodist Episcopal Church in 1886. Benton had also been the president of the Southeastern Kansas Teachers Association in 1891, Assistant State Superintendent of Public Instruction in Kansas 1895–96, and the President of Upper Iowa University from 1899 until 1902.

At Miami, Benton promoted the founding of the first sorority, Delta Zeta and created the idea of having a fraternity house row on High Street. He served his own fraternity, Phi Delta Theta as national president. He took a leave of absence, and spent the 1909–10 school year in Europe. By the time Benton resigned in 1911 to become the president of the University of Vermont from 1911 to 1919, the student enrollment had increased from 124 (in 1902) to over 1,200. The income had become almost a quarter of a million dollars, and seven new buildings had been constructed. After his presidency at Vermont, Benton went back to Europe with his family and became the head of war-time YMCA and was the educational director of the American Army Occupation. He went to Manila and became the president of the University of the Philippines after World War I from 1921 to 1924. He contracted a rare disease while he was abroad and died on June 28, 1928. His funeral was in Benton Hall and he was buried in the Oxford Cemetery.

== John W. Hall ==
Hall Auditorium is currently named for John W. Hall, the fifth president of Miami University. Hall was born in Orange County, North Carolina on January 19, 1802. Hall was licensed to preach by the Presbytery of West Tennessee at age 32. He was an evangelist and Pastor in Tennessee. In 1837, he organized and became president of a Female Seminary in Gallatin. He was a pastor in Dayton, Ohio and Huntsville, Alabama, and came to Miami to become president in 1854. He was president during the Civil War and had trouble as a southern in the north. He was accused of being disloyal to the Union. Dr. Alfred H. Upham wrote the following about Hall: "Doctor Hall, a fine Southern gentleman of the old school, who with rare tact and splendid self-control had directed the affairs of this patriotic northern college, found at last, when the struggle was over, that hostility had arisen and his usefulness was ended."

After his presidency at Miami, Hall went to Covington, Kentucky, where he served as Superintendent of Public schools from 1866 to 1876. He died in Covington on January 6, 1886.

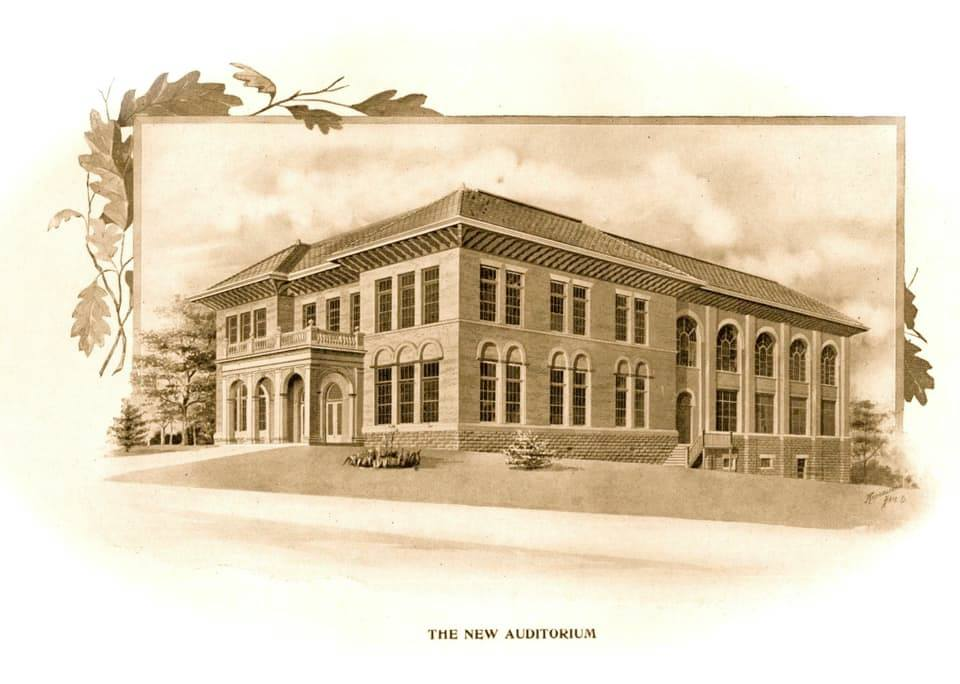
Artist's rendering of the soon-to-be-constructed Miami University Auditorium, c. 1907

== Notable events ==
Actors: Harry Connick Jr. (filming a scene for Little Man Tate), Richard Le Gallienne, George Clooney and Ryan Gosling

Performers: John Philip Sousa's band, Cincinnati Symphony Orchestra, The Fisk Jubilee Singers, Fritz Kreisler, Andrés Segovia, Percy Grainger, Alexander Kipnis, the Don Coassack Chorus, Jesús María Sanromá, the London String Quartet, Richard Dyer-Bennet, Janos Starker, Robert Goldsand, Eleanor Steber, Lucille Browning, Blanche Thebom, the King's Singers, the Budapest String Quartet, Zino Franciscatti and Dizzy Gillespie. Dancers: Martha Graham and Paul Draper

Speakers: Robert Frost, Frank Lloyd Wright, P. J. O'Rourke, Norman Thomas, Basil Rathbone, Major Alexander De Severesky, Percy MacKaye, Adolphe Menjou, Ogden Nash, Edna St. Vincent Millay, Cornelia Otis Skinner, and Emlyn Williams.

Touring companies: Coburn Players, the Robertson Players, Stuart Walker's Portmanteau Theater, the Oxford University Players, the Young Ireland Player and New York company of "Green Pastures", starring Richard B. Harrison.

Others: Sesquicentennial Symposium on the Arts in America brought Clifton Fadima, John Ciardi, Norris Houghton, Phillip R. Adams, Richard Neutra, Millard Sheets, and Halsey Stevens. During World War II, Miami helped train 10,000 people for military service. Many would watch training films or relax in what was then considered Benton Hall.
