= El Pasig =

Former Filipino biweekly newspaper

- Frequency: biweekly
- First issue: July 13, 1862
- Final issue: January 1863
- Language: Spanish, Tagalog, occasionally other native Philippine languages

El Pasig was a Filipino biweekly newspaper, published in Manila from July 1862, and closed after a few months of operation in January 1863. It published educational content and is historically significant as the first publication to feature texts in native Philippine languages. Its closure influenced colonial authorities' policies toward the press in Filipino languages.

== History ==
El Pasig was published in Manila and directed by Acisclo Sierra. Its first issue appeared on 13 July 1862, though some sources erroneously cite 1864 as the year it began circulation. The last, twelfth issue was released only a few months later, in January 1863. The subscription cost was one and a half reales in Manila and two reales outside the capital.

Scholars note that understanding the full history of this publication is difficult due to the limited number of available sources. Possible reasons for its downfall include the high subscription price, a small potential readership, and content that failed to generate sufficient interest among readers.

== Content ==
The newspaper was intended to be educational, promoting science and knowledge. It dedicated considerable space to agricultural topics, while also publishing poetry and reports on local events. Additionally, it aimed to inform readers about developments in the metropolis and other countries.

== Significance ==
Despite its short existence, El Pasig holds an important place in Philippine history. It was primarily a Spanish-language publication, but it was the first newspaper in the archipelago to feature content in languages other than Spanish. Most notably, it included articles written in Tagalog. Occasionally, there were also texts in other Philippine languages such as Ilocano, Bikol, and Pangasinan, with some sources also mentioning Cebuano. These texts were often contributions from the readers themselves, who sent in their translations of articles previously published in El Pasig in Spanish.

Its significance, however, extends beyond just linguistic matters. Paradoxically, it was the failure of El Pasig and the lack of significant interest in it that lulled the colonial authorities and Spanish censors into a false sense of security. They began to view attempts at creating a native Filipino press more favorably, assuming that it did not pose a threat to Spanish rule. Nearly 20 years after the closure of El Pasig, the bilingual Diariong Tagalog emerged, considered the first Tagalog newspaper. The permission for its publication was granted after discussions that referenced the brief existence of El Pasig. In 1889, the first issue of the bilingual El Ilocano was published, which, like Diariong Tagalog, was printed in both Spanish and Ilocano. This newspaper was also the first to be financed, edited, and published by a Filipino, without the involvement of individuals from the metropolis.

== Bibliography ==
- Retana, Wenceslao Emilio (1895). El Periodismo Filipino. Noticias para su historia (1811–1894). Apuntes bibliográficos, indicaciones biográficas, notas críticas, semblanzas, anécdotas [Filipino Journalism: News for its History (1811–1894). Bibliographic Notes, Biographical Indications, Critical Remarks, Portraits, Anecdotes] (in Spanish). Madrid: Imp. de la Viuda de M. Minuesa de los Ríos.
- Thomas, Megan C. (2006). "Isabelo de los Reyes and the Philippine Contemporaries of La Solidaridad". Philippine Studies. 54 (3). Ateneo de Manila University: 381–411. ISSN 2244-1638. JSTOR 42633878.
