= El Ilocano =

Filipino biweekly magazine

- Frequency: biweekly
- First issue: 1889
- Final issue: 1896
- Language: Spanish, Ilocano

El Ilocano was a Filipino biweekly magazine, created and financed by Isabelo de los Reyes. It published articles with anti-clerical and pro-independence themes. The magazine featured popular science content and focused on regional topics. It was in circulation between 1889 and 1896 and was a bilingual publication, printed in both Spanish and Ilocano. It holds a significant place in Filipino history as the first newspaper entirely directed by a Filipino. It is also considered the first Ilocano-language periodical.

== Background ==
The biweekly El Ilocano was published in Manila. It was founded by Isabelo de los Reyes, a relatively young journalist at the time, who also served as its editor and financial backer. The magazine operated between 1889 and 1896. A monthly subscription cost readers one peseta. The publication gained significant popularity, distinguishing itself from earlier native-language newspapers such as the short-lived Diariong Tagalog, which lasted only a few months. In 1892, El Ilocano was awarded a gold medal during an exhibition held as part of the annual festival in Candon. After four years in operation, its circulation increased, and from that point on, de los Reyes printed the magazine using his own press, eliminating the need for external printing services. The Philippine Revolution eventually brought an end to the publication of El Ilocano.

== Content ==
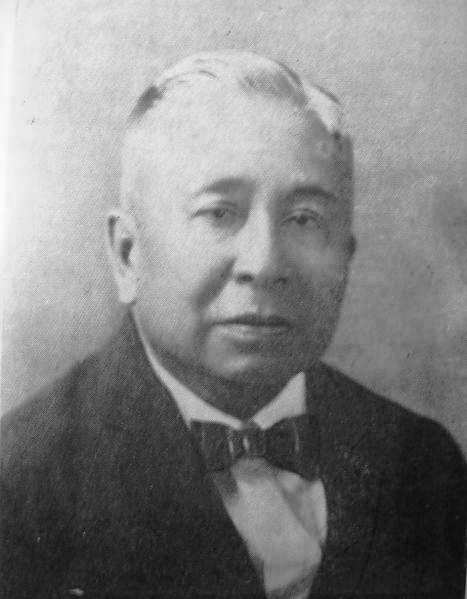
Isabelo de los Reyes, the creator of El Ilocano

Isabelo de los Reyes, the creator of El Ilocano, made the magazine both anti-clerical and pro-independence. Although de los Reyes never joined the Katipunan, a secret revolutionary organization aimed at freeing the Philippines from Spanish rule, his biweekly publication echoed the group’s ideology. It also opposed the privileged position of the Catholic clergy, sometimes doing so in very direct ways. Some sources suggest that the attacks on the clergy in Ilocano areas following the outbreak of the 1896 revolution were a result of the magazine’s aggressive rhetoric.

The publication covered a wide range of topics, not limited to socio-political issues. It sought to popularize science, with articles on geography, agriculture, law, and mathematics. It also addressed administration and religious matters. Distinctly regional in its tone, the magazine focused on a single ethnic group, reflected in its articles on Ilocano history. It sometimes featured poetry and practical advice on everyday life and included a section dedicated to women. Besides de los Reyes, contributors included Ignacio Villamor, Claro Caluya, Mena Crisologo, Mariano Dacanay, and Canuto Medina.

Among contemporary Filipino elites, El Ilocano caused some discomfort. It frequently published content about the traditions and customs of the archipelago. The unease did not stem from discussing Filipino customs or folklore but from its references to practices that European-educated Filipinos considered superstitions.

== Significance ==
Although El Ilocano was published for only a few years, it found its place in Philippine history as a bilingual magazine, with texts printed both in Spanish and Ilocano. It is considered the first Ilocano newspaper. The choice of these two languages likely had both practical and political motivations. Spanish allowed the publication to reach readers beyond the Philippines and gain international recognition, while Ilocano created a vital connection with its primary audience. De los Reyes likely intended to emphasize that all indigenous languages of the archipelago deserved equal presence in the public sphere. Some have even suggested that he used this language choice to challenge the status of Tagalog as the lingua franca of the Philippines.

The significance of El Ilocano extends beyond pioneering Ilocano journalism. It was the first newspaper financed, edited, and published by a Filipino, without involvement from Spanish colonists. Wenceslao Retana called it the first truly Filipino publication. Several misconceptions have arisen regarding its place in Philippine press history. El Ilocano is sometimes mistakenly cited as the first newspaper published in a native Filipino language or as the first example of Philippine regional press.

The magazine also provided a significant platform for Ilocano intellectuals of the late 19th century to exchange ideas, refine their writing, and develop rhetorical skills, thus contributing to the strengthening of a burgeoning Filipino national identity.

== Bibliography ==
- Thomas, Megan C. (2006). "Isabelo de los Reyes and the Philippine Contemporaries of La Solidaridad". Philippine Studies. 54 (3). Ateneo de Manila University: 381–411. ISSN 2244-1638. JSTOR 42633878.
- Lent, J. A. (1966). "The Press of the Philippines: Its History and Problems". Journalism Quarterly. 43 (4). SAGE Publications, Association for Education in Journalism and Mass Communication: 739–752. doi:10.1177/107769906604300416. ISSN 2161-430X.
