= Juan Villamor =

Filipino revolutionary and politician

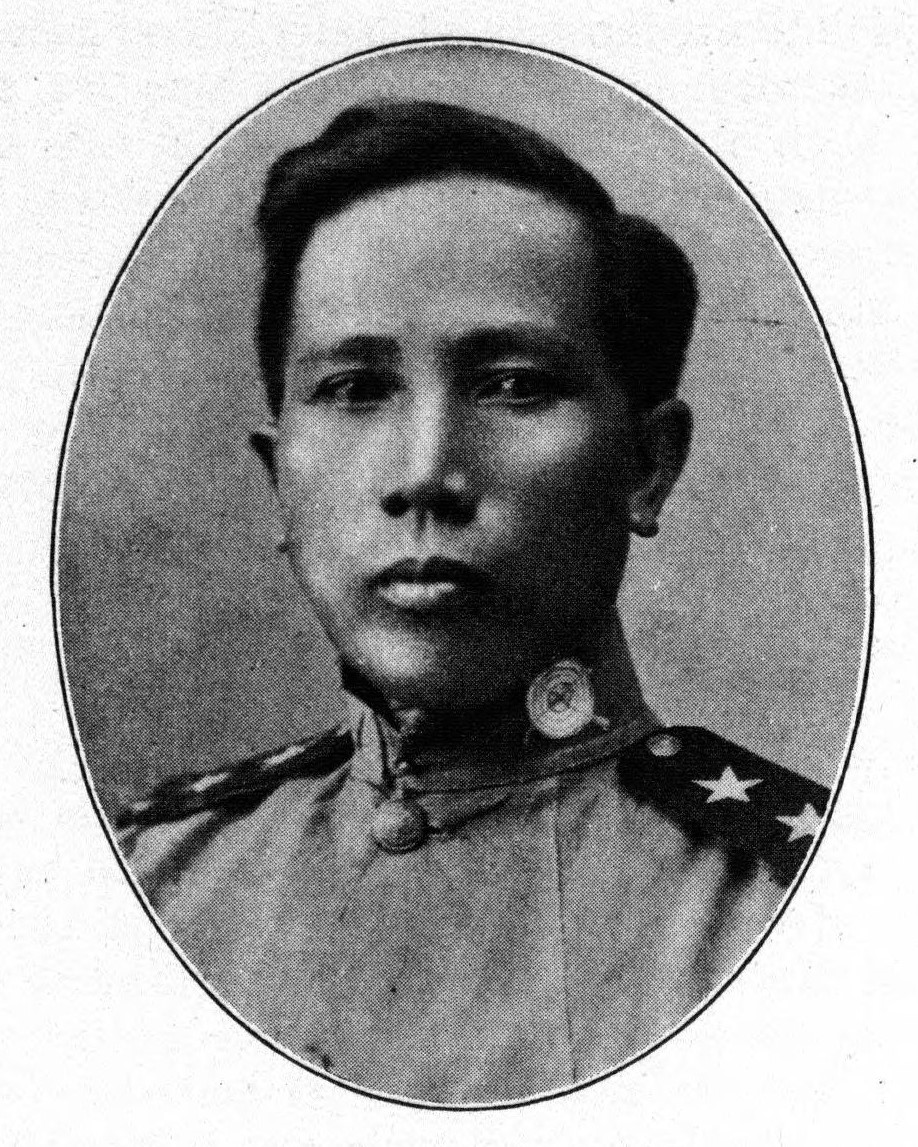

Senator of the Philippines from the 1st District
- In office October 16, 1916 – June 3, 1919 Serving with Vicente Singson Encarnacion
- Preceded by: Office established
- Succeeded by: Santiago Fonacier

Member of the Philippine Assembly from Ilocos Sur's 3rd District
- In office 1907–1912
- Preceded by: Office established
- Succeeded by: Julio Borbon

5th Governor of Ilocos Sur
- In office 1912–1916
- Preceded by: Manuel Singson
- Succeeded by: Jose Villanueva

1st Governor of Abra
- In office 1902–1904
- Preceded by: Position established
- Succeeded by: Joaquin Ortega

Member of the Malolos Congress from Abra
- In office 1898–1899 Serving with Isidro Paredes

Personal details
- Born: November 24, 1864 Bangued, Abra, Captaincy General of the Philippines
- Party: Nacionalista
- Other political affiliations: Popular Front (1941)
- Relations: Ignacio Villamor (brother)

Juan Villamor y Borbón (November 24, 1864 – unknown) was a Filipino writer, revolutionary and politician.

== Early life ==
Juan Villamor was born on November 24, 1864, in Bangued, Abra, to Florencio Villamor y García and Wenceslawa Borbón. He received his Bachelor of Laws degree at the San Juan de Letran College in Manila and pursued further studies in law in the University of Santo Tomas. He worked as an interpreter in the Courts of First Instance of Abra and Ilocos Sur from 1886 to 1889 but was ordered banished to Benguet in 1890 by Spanish Governor-General Valeriano Weyler.

== Military career ==
During the Philippine Revolution he was forced by Spanish friars to join the Spanish Army but was taken prisoner by the Philippine Revolutionary Army in Bataan. After the establishment of the First Philippine Republic, he was ordered by Apolinario Mabini to join the editorial staff of the official newspaper El Heraldo de la Revolucion in Malolos from 1898 to 1899. During the Philippine-American War, he served under the command of revolutionary General Manuel Tinio and became colonel of infantry. He commanded revolutionary forces in the Ilocos and Abra before surrendering to the Americans. He continued his journalistic career, as editor of La Nueva Era, after the establishment of American rule. Villamor authored one of the first biographies of General Antonio Luna.

== Political career ==
Villamor began his political career as secretary of the sub-province of Abra in 1901; and became its 1st civil governor from 1902 to 1904. He was then sent to the United States as honorary commissioner at St. Louis Exposition in 1904. In 1907, he was elected to the first Philippine Assembly from the third district of Ilocos Sur, serving until 1912, when he became governor of Ilocos Sur. At the end of his term in 1916, he ran for and won a seat in the newly established Philippine Senate representing the 1st District (comprising the provinces of Batanes, Cagayan, Isabela, Ilocos Norte, Ilocos Sur, and Abra). He served until 1919. During his tenure in the legislature, Villamor lobbied for the separation of Abra into an independent province from Ilocos Sur, which was finally realized in 1917. Villamor was the chairperson for the Senate Committee on National Security. During the Commonwealth era, he was appointed by President Manuel Quezon to head the Philippine Veterans Office.

== Images ==
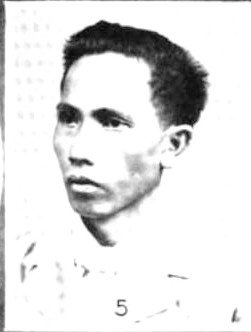
Villamor as governor of Abra, published c. 1905, by the United States Bureau of the Census

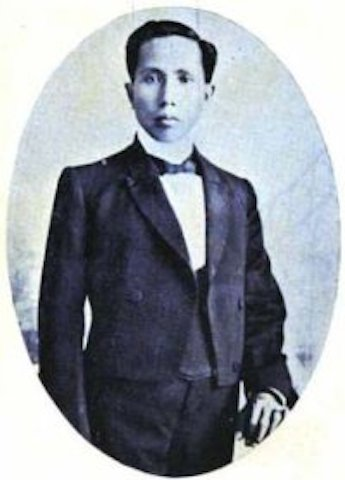
Villamor as a member of the Philippine Assembly, 1908

== Legacy ==
The provincial headquarters of the Philippine National Police in Bangued, Abra, is named after him.
