= Philippines's 1st senatorial district =

- Former constituency for the Senate of the Philippines
- Provinces / Cities: Abra, Batanes, Cagayan, Ilocos Norte, Ilocos Sur, Isabela
- Population: 992,845 (1935)
- Electorate: 159,411 (1935)

Former constituency
- Created: 1916
- Abolished: 1934

Philippines's 1st senatorial district, officially the First Senatorial District of the Philippine Islands (Spanish: Primer Distrito Senatorial de las Islas Filipinas), was one of the twelve senatorial districts of the Philippines in existence between 1916 and 1935. It elected two members to the Senate of the Philippines, the upper chamber of the bicameral Philippine Legislature under the Insular Government of the Philippine Islands for each of the 4th to 10th legislatures. The district was created under the 1916 Jones Law from the northern Luzon provinces of Batanes, Cagayan, Ilocos Norte, Ilocos Sur and Isabela. Abra was added in 1917 upon its re-establishment as a regular province separate from Ilocos Sur.

The district was represented by a total of six senators throughout its existence. It was abolished in 1935 when a unicameral National Assembly was installed under a new constitution following the passage of the Tydings–McDuffie Act which established the Commonwealth of the Philippines. Since the 1941 elections when the Senate was restored after a constitutional plebiscite, all twenty-four members of the upper house have been elected countrywide at-large. It was last represented by Elpidio Quirino and Melecio Arranz of the Nacionalista Democrático.

== List of senators ==
Seat A							Legislature	Seat B						
#	Image	Senator	Term of office		Party	Electoral history	Legislature	#	Image	Senator	Term of office		Party	Electoral history
#	Image	Senator	Start	End	Party	Electoral history	Legislature	#	Image	Senator	Start	End	Party	Electoral history
1		Vicente Singson Encarnacion	October 16, 1916	June 6, 1922	Progresista	Elected in 1916.	4th	1		Juan Villamor	October 16, 1916	June 3, 1919	Nacionalista	Elected in 1916.
1		Vicente Singson Encarnacion	October 16, 1916	June 6, 1922	Progresista	Elected in 1916.	5th	2		Santiago Fonacier	June 3, 1919	June 2, 1925	Nacionalista	Elected in 1919.
2		Isabelo de los Reyes	June 6, 1922	June 5, 1928	Nacionalista; Colectivista	Elected in 1922.	6th	2		Santiago Fonacier	June 3, 1919	June 2, 1925	Nacionalista; Colectivista	Elected in 1919.
2		Isabelo de los Reyes	June 6, 1922	June 5, 1928	Nacionalista; Consolidado	Elected in 1922.	7th	3		Elpidio Quirino	June 2, 1925	September 16, 1935	Nacionalista; Consolidado	Elected in 1925.
3		Melecio Arranz	June 5, 1928	September 16, 1935	Nacionalista; Consolidado	Elected in 1928.	8th	3		Elpidio Quirino	June 2, 1925	September 16, 1935	Nacionalista; Consolidado	Elected in 1925.
3		Melecio Arranz	June 5, 1928	September 16, 1935	Nacionalista; Consolidado	Elected in 1928.	9th	3		Elpidio Quirino	June 2, 1925	September 16, 1935	Nacionalista; Consolidado	Re-elected in 1931.
3		Melecio Arranz	June 5, 1928	September 16, 1935	Nacionalista; Democrático	Re-elected in 1934.	10th	3		Elpidio Quirino	June 2, 1925	September 16, 1935	Nacionalista; Democrático	Re-elected in 1931.

== See also ==
- Senatorial districts of the Philippines
