= Vicente Singson Encarnacion =

Filipino lawyer and politician (1875-1961)

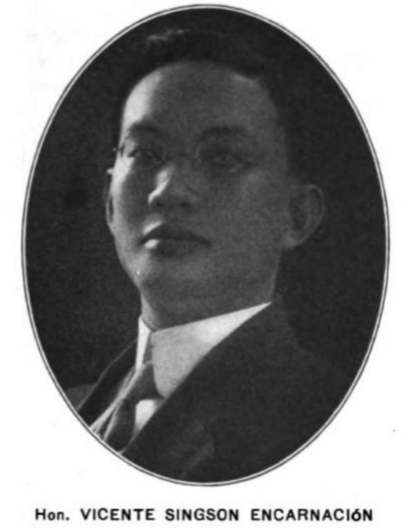
- Official portrait as a senator, c. 1917

Secretary of Agriculture and Commerce
- In office June 12, 1945 – May 28, 1946
- President: Sergio Osmeña
- Preceded by: Delfín Jaranilla (as Secretary of Justice, Agriculture and Commerce)
- Succeeded by: Mariano Garchitorena
- In office 1933–1934
- Governor-General: Frank Murphy
- Preceded by: Rafael Alunan Sr.
- Succeeded by: Eulogio Rodriguez

Secretary of Finance
- Acting
- In office April 30, 1933 – July 24, 1934
- Governor-General: Frank Murphy
- Preceded by: Rafael Alunan Sr.
- Succeeded by: Elpidio Quirino

Senator of the Philippines from the 1st senatorial district
- In office October 16, 1916 – June 6, 1922 Serving with Juan Villamor (1916-1919), Santiago Fonacier (1919-1922)
- Preceded by: District established
- Succeeded by: Isabelo de los Reyes

Member of the House of Representatives from Ilocos Sur's 1st district
- In office October 16, 1907 – October 30, 1913
- Preceded by: District established
- Succeeded by: Alberto Reyes

Personal details
- Born: August 5, 1875 Vigan, Ilocos Sur, Captaincy General of the Philippines
- Died: May 27, 1961 (aged 85) Caloocan, Rizal, Philippines
- Party: Progresista (1907–1922)
- Spouse: Lucila Diaz Conde
- Children: 8
- Education: Ateneo de Manila (BA); University of Santo Tomas (LL.B.)

Vicente Singson Encarnacion (August 5, 1875 – May 27, 1961) was a Filipino lawyer, politician and businessman. Encarnacion served as a member of the Senate of the Philippines from 1916 to 1922.

During the 1919–1922 Philippine financial crisis, Encarnacion was investigated by the Wood administration due to his approval of speculative loans made by the Philippine National Bank. As acting finance secretary, he supported the establishment of a central bank in the Philippines and raised concerns of the economic reliance of the islands' currency to the United States.

Due to his economic proposals' lack of support from the government and key political figures, he then resigned from government service in 1934 with his ideas not being implemented. Afterwards, he returned to his business life.

== Early life and education ==
Vicente Singson Encarnacion was born on August 5, 1875, in Vigan, Ilocos Sur to Agripino Singson and Benita Encarnacion. Benita Encarnacion was part of a Chinese merchant clan in Vigan with roots near Xiamen, China. He received his Bachelor of Arts degree at the Ateneo de Manila and his Bachelor of Laws at the University of Santo Tomas.

== Political career ==
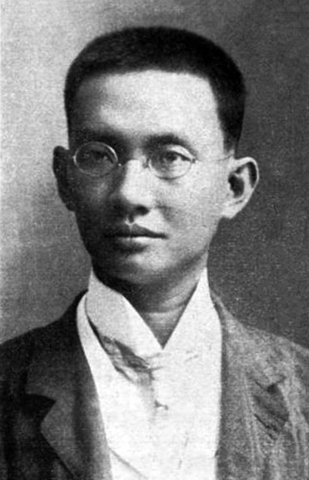
Singson as a member of the Philippine Assembly, 1908

In September 1901, Encarnacion was appointed prosecuting attorney (fiscal) of Ilocos Sur. In 1907 he was elected to the Philippine House of Representatives for the Progresista Party for the 1st district of Ilocos Sur. A year later he was elected president of the Progresista Party. Re-elected in 1909 and 1911, he served until 1913. On October 30 of that year, Encarnacion was appointed to the Philippine Commission.

In 1916, Encarnacion was elected to the newly established Senate of the Philippines representing the 1st district. Because he received the most votes in the district, he won a six-year term in the Senate until 1922. Encarnacion was the only senator who was not a member of the Nacionalista Party during his time in office. During his term, he joined the Philippine independence mission to the US in 1919.

Encarnacion was generally referred to as "Singson" during his career as a politician. Similar with House Speaker Sergio Osmeña, he was also a politician of Chinese-descent.

=== 1919–1922 Philippine financial crisis ===
Philippine National Bank board members Vicente Madrigal, Senator Vicente Singson Encarnacion, and Manila Mayor Ramón J. Fernández were investigated for approving questionable loans against the PNB charter. Encarnacion was examined for a one-million-peso loan to a company he was part of, while Fernandez and Madrigal faced scrutiny over loans exceeding Php 4 million to firms they invested in. Agriculture Secretary Rafael Corpus later cleared them of wrongdoing.

== As a financier ==
In 1923, he distanced himself from politics to pursue his business interests and became engaged in the management of numerous corporations. Encarnacion stated that he entered business because he wanted to "better my condition in life." After his stint in the Senate, he held top positions in insurance, banking and real estate. He was president of the Philippine Guaranty Co., Inc. and Balintawak Estate, Inc. From April 1933 to July 1934 he was secretary of agriculture and commerce and at the same time secretary of finance in the cabinet of US Governor-General Theodore Roosevelt Jr.

=== As agriculture and commerce secretary ===
Under his leadership, the department established the Manila Trading Center and organized the first "Made in the Philippines Products Week" in August 1933 to promote domestic trade.

=== As acting finance secretary ===
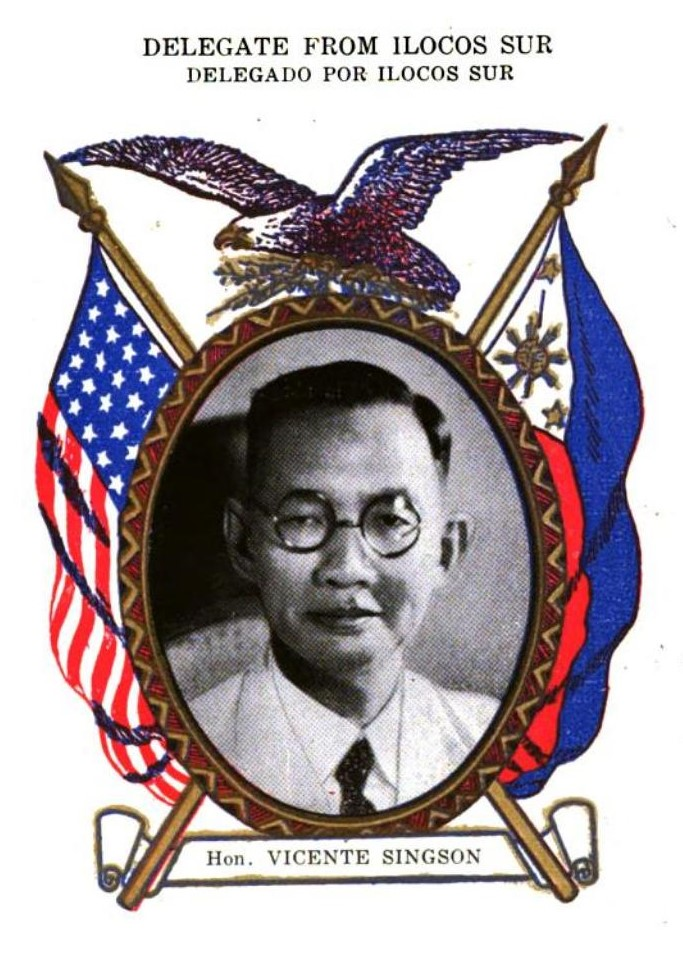
Singson as a delegate to the Philippine Constitutional Convention, published by Benipayo Press (c. 1935)

Encarnacion became the acting secretary of finance after Rafael Alunan's resignation. He aimed to reduce the Philippines' reliance on the U.S. economy. In June 1934, he voiced concerns about a potential shift in the Philippine monetary system to a dollar exchange standard, warning it could be "harmful." In a memorandum from July 6, 1933, he highlighted two main issues: the risk of the Philippine currency being tied too closely to the U.S. currency and the negative impact of U.S. inflation on the Philippine economy. He suggested inviting a monetary expert to evaluate the need for an independent monetary system. In terms of US inflationary measures, he asserted:

In many cases, the likelihood is that this country [Philippines] would be the loser in the sense that its currency would depreciate in value . . .

— Vicente Singson Encarnacion to the Governor General, Memorandum for His Excellency, the Governor General, Subject: Amendment to the Provisions of Section 1611 of the Administrative Code, July 6, 1933

On August 5, 1933, he recommended that the Philippine government set up a monetary system based on gold bullion, not dollar exchange, and suggested devaluing the peso by half its current value.

In his return from the United States after joining Manuel L. Quezon's last independence mission, in 1934, he stressed the need for an independent central bank in the Philippines, noting that the existing PNB cannot fulfill its responsibilities. He suggested that the PNB should focus on long-term finance for agriculture such as those in Greece.

Encarnacion's proposals to change the economic structure in the Philippines did not gain support from Quezon or influential Americans. The sugar industry, benefiting from favorable loans from the PNB, rejected the creation of a central bank, while Manila Americans, who enjoyed free trade, opposed anything related to Philippine independence. The currency system was reformed by Governor General Leonard Wood with minimal government intervention. J. Weldon Jones, a key adviser to Governor General Frank Murphy and Insular Auditor, also opposed his central bank proposal.

He eventually left the government after his ideas were not implemented. In 1934, he returned to business life. His successor, Elpidio Quirino, tried to implement his ideas in government. Similar to him, Quirino received minimal support from the Murphy administration.

=== Philippine Constitution ===
During the 1934 Philippine Constitutional Convention, there were debates on whether to remove the article on national territory in the Constitution draft. The debates came amid concerns on increasing Japanese presence in Davao and the Philippines' close proximity to Japanese-occupied Taiwan. Encarnacion, along with Ruperto Montinola supported its inclusion arguing that defining the national territory in the Constitution would erase doubts on the extent of the Philippines' territory. Encarnacion was the principal sponsor of the national territory provision.

== Death and family ==
Encarnacion died in Caloocan in 1961 at the age of 85. He was married to Lucila Diaz Conde in 1911 and had eight children.
