= Ilocos Sur's at-large congressional district =

Legislative district of the Philippines

- Former constituency for the House of Representatives of the Philippines
- Province: Ilocos Sur

Former constituency
- Created: 1898 (first creation); 1943 (second creation); 1984 (third creation)
- Abolished: 1907 (first abolition); 1945 (second abolition); 1986 (third abolition)

Ilocos Sur's at-large congressional district is an obsolete electoral district that was used for electing members of Philippine national legislatures in Ilocos Sur before 1987.

Ilocos Sur first elected its representatives at-large during the 1898 Philippine legislative election for three seats in the Malolos Congress, the National Assembly of the First Philippine Republic, with an additional seat granted to an appointed delegate. Following the installation of U.S. civil government in 1901 and the reorganization of provinces for the Philippine Assembly, Ilocos Sur was divided into a first, second and third district.

Its third district was eliminated following the separation of Abra in 1917. The provincewide electoral district was re-created ahead of the 1943 Philippine legislative election for a seat in the National Assembly of the Second Philippine Republic, with an additional seat assigned to its provincial governor. The district became inactive again following the restoration of the House of Representatives in 1945 when Ilocos Sur returned to electing its representatives from its two districts.

In the unicameral Batasang Pambansa that replaced the House in 1978, Ilocos Sur was included in the multi-member regional electoral district of Region I (Ilocos Region) for its interim parliament. The district was again utilized in the 1984 Philippine parliamentary election when Ilocos Sur was granted two seats in the regular parliament.

After 1986, Ilocos Sur elected its representatives from its two single-member congressional districts restored under a new constitution.

== List of members representing the district ==
=== Malolos Congress (1898–1901) ===
Seat A						Seat B						Seat C						Seat D						Legislature	Constituent LGUs
Portrait	Member	Term of office		Party	Electoral history	Portrait	Member	Term of office		Party	Electoral history	Portrait	Member	Term of office		Party	Electoral history	Portrait	Member	Term of office		Party	Electoral history	Legislature	Constituent LGUs
Portrait	Member	Start	End	Party	Electoral history	Portrait	Member	Start	End	Party	Electoral history	Portrait	Member	Start	End	Party	Electoral history	Portrait	Member	Start	End	Party	Electoral history	Legislature	Constituent LGUs
District created June 18, 1898.
	Marcelino Crisólogo	September 15, 1898	March 23, 1901	Nonpartisan	Appointed by President Emilio Aguinaldo.		Mariano Fos	September 15, 1898	March 23, 1901	Nonpartisan	Elected in 1898.		Francisco Tongson	September 15, 1898	March 23, 1901	Nonpartisan	Elected in 1898.		Ignacio Villamor	September 15, 1898	March 23, 1901	Nonpartisan	Elected in 1898.	Malolos Congress	1898–1901 [data missing]
District dissolved into Ilocos Sur's 1st, 2nd, and 3rd districts for the Philippine Assembly.

=== National Assembly (1935–1945) ===
==== Second Republic ====
Seat A						Seat B						Legislature	Constituent LGUs
Portrait	Member	Term of office		Party	Electoral history	Portrait	Member	Term of office		Party	Electoral history	Legislature	Constituent LGUs
Portrait	Member	Start	End	Party	Electoral history	Portrait	Member	Start	End	Party	Electoral history	Legislature	Constituent LGUs
District re-created September 7, 1943.
	Fidel Villanueva	September 25, 1943	February 2, 1944	KALIBAPI	Elected in 1943.		Alejandro Quirologico	September 25, 1943	February 2, 1944	KALIBAPI	Appointed as an ex officio member. (Note: As Governor of Ilocos Sur.)	National Assembly (Second Republic)	1943–1944 [data missing]

=== Batasang Pambansa (1978–1986) ===
Seat A						Seat B						Legislature	Constituent LGUs
Portrait	Member	Term of office		Party	Electoral history	Portrait	Member	Term of office		Party	Electoral history	Legislature	Constituent LGUs
Portrait	Member	Start	End	Party	Electoral history	Portrait	Member	Start	End	Party	Electoral history	Legislature	Constituent LGUs
District re-created February 1, 1984.
	Salacnib Baterina	June 30, 1984	March 25, 1986	KBL	Elected in 1984.		Eric Singson	June 30, 1984	March 25, 1986	KBL	Elected in 1984.	Regular Batasang Pambansa	1984–1986 [data missing]
District dissolved into Ilocos Sur's 1st and 2nd districts for the House of Representatives.

== Election results ==
=== 1984 ===
1984 Philippine parliamentary election in Ilocos Sur
Party	Candidate	Votes	%
KBL	Salacnib Baterina	161,218	
KBL	Eric Singson	147,734	
UNIDO	Pablito Sanidad Jr.	78,050	
KBL	Chavit Singson		
Nacionalista	Porfirio Rapanut	13,365	
UNIDO	Ramon Encarnacion		
Independent	Benjamin Singson		
KBL	Godofredo Reyes		
Independent	Pedro Singson		
Nacionalista	Clemente Gagarin		
Nacionalista	Augusto Tobias		
Independent	Fidel Villanueva		
Independent	Francisco Ante		
Independent	Ernesto Antolin		
Independent	Jose Bragado		
Independent	Lucas Cauton		

== See also ==
- Legislative districts of Ilocos Sur
