= Pauline Benton =

American puppeteer

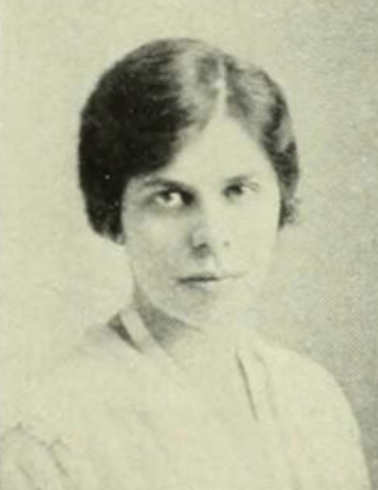
- Pauline Benton, from the 1920 yearbook of Barnard College
- Born: January 25, 1898; Baldwin City, Kansas, U.S.
- Died: November 22, 1974 (age 76); Monterey, California, U.S.
- Occupations: Puppeteer, arts administrator
- Known for: Founder of Red Gate Players (1932)
- Father: Guy Potter Benton

Pauline Corinth Benton (January 25, 1898 – November 22, 1974) was an American puppeteer and scholar, known for her work in Chinese shadow puppet theatre.

== Early life and education ==
Benton was born in Baldwin City, Kansas, the daughter of Guy Potter Benton and Dolla Konantz Benton. Her father was president of several universities, including the University of the Philippines; her mother and sister Helen were art and antiques collectors. She graduated from Barnard College in 1920. While visiting her aunt, Emma Konantz, a mathematics professor in Beijing, she studied Chinese shadow puppets there, with Li Tuochen.

== Career ==
Benton formed the Red Gate Players in New York in 1932, and presented shows based on traditional Chinese tales, using shadow puppets. She also gave lectures on the art form. She and her troupe gave a performance at the White House in 1936, at the invitation of Eleanor Roosevelt. In 1937, the Red Gate Players gave daily summer programs in Ogunquit, Maine, and toured with dancer King Lan Chew. In 1940, the Red Gate Players performed in Madison, Wisconsin, at a benefit for a Chinese hospital. Her short film "Chinese Shadow Plays" was shown at the Nelson Gallery of Art in Kansas City in 1948.

Benton amassed a collection of over 600 antique shadow figures and other devices related to the art, and commissioned many more figures and scenery items especially for her own use. Her puppet collection was featured in an exhibit at the Minnesota Museum of Art in 1970 and 1971. Benton and her sister donated their family's collection of textiles, sculptures, ceramics, and paintings to the MInnesota Museum of Art.

== Publications ==
- "Me and My Shadows" (1953, Puppetry Journal)
- "The Puppets of Carmel" (1960, Puppetry Journal)

== Personal life and legacy ==
Benton died from a brain tumor in 1974, at the age of 76, in Monterey, California. Her collections were partly donated to a museum, and partly handed along to another performer interested in Chinese shadow puppets, Jo Humphrey. When Humphrey retired in 1999, the collection was passed along to Kuang-yu Fong and Stephen Kaplin of Chinese Theatre Works. Benton was the subject of a biography, Shadow Woman: The Extraordinary Career of Pauline Benton (2013), published by McGill–Queens University Press. The Ballard Institute and Museum of Puppetry at the University of Connecticut exhibited her puppets in 2012, and hosted a symposium about Chinese shadow theatre in 2013. The Flushing Town Hall Gallery hosted exhibits about Benton's work in 2017 and 2025.
