= David Stanton Tappan =

American university president (1845–1922)

Rev. David Stanton Tappan (April 2, 1845 – March 20, 1922) was an American Presbyterian minister who served as president of Miami University from 1899–1902.

Tappan was from a distinguished American family, the grandson of Benjamin Tappan and nephew of Edwin M. Stanton. Born in Steubenville, Ohio, he graduated from Miami University in 1864. He earned a Bachelor of Divinity degree from the Theological Seminary at Allegheny, Pennsylvania in 1867 and M.A. degrees from the College of Wooster and Miami University. He earned his D. D. degree at Lenox College in Iowa. He was appointed president of Miami University in 1899.

Early in his ministerial career, he pastored several churches in Iowa including many years in Mount Pleasant. He married Anna L. Grand-Girard in 1869. He died in California in 1922. Tappan Hall, a dormitory on the Miami University campus is named in his memory.

Preceded by William Oxley Thompson	President of Miami University; 1899–1902	Succeeded by Guy Potter Benton
