= Bible translations into Ilocano =

The Ilocano Bible, published in 1909, is the second Bible to be published in any Philippine language, after the Tagalog which was published in 1905.

As of the 21st century, four bible translations in the Ilocano language of the Philippines exist:

- Ti Biblia: based on the American Standard Version and some available Spanish Versions
- Naimbag a Damag Biblia: an equivalent translation of the Good News Bible based on the Novum Testamentum Graecae and the Biblia Hebraica Stuttgartensia.
- Ti Baro a Naimbag a Damag Biblia: An update of the Naimbag a Damag Biblia based on the same versions of the Holy Scriptures.
- Baro a Lubong a Patarus ti Nasantuan a Kasuratan: based from the English New World Translation of the Holy Scriptures, produced by Jehovah's Witnesses.

== History ==
After six years of laborious effort, the American Bible Society and the British and Foreign Bible Society published the Ilocano New Testament in 1904. Simply titled Ti Baro a Tulag Wenno Ti Baro a Testamento ni Apo Tayo a Jesucristo (The New Agreement or the New Testament of Our Lord Jesus Christ). Though much of the supervision was given as a task to the BFBS, the work was enthusiastically assisted by the different American Protestant Missionaries in the North. Among the well known translators was Isabelo de los Reyes, the founder of the Iglesia Filipina Independiente, who as gaoled in Barcelona during that time.

Five years later, the BFBS finished the translation of the Old Testament and gave it the title Ti Daan a Tulag nga Isu ti Umuna a Paset ti Santa Biblia (The Old Testament which is the First Part of the Holy Bible) thus allowing the final publication of the complete Protestant Ilocano Bible in 1912. Unlike the two separate versions, this Ilocano Bible was simply called Ti Biblia (Ilocano: The Bible).

However, when the Good News Translation or the Today's English Version was published in the United States in 1966, the Philippine Bible Society commissioned another group of translators to translate the Bible following the same principles of dynamic equivalence. Thus, the publication of Ti Baro a Tulag ti Naimbag a Damag Biblia (the New Testament of the Good News Bible) came in 1973, and 10 years later the complete Ti Naimbag a Damag Biblia.

During this time, the Roman Catholic Church, through the papal encyclical Divino afflante Spiritu, which has been dubbed as the "Magna Carta for Biblical Progress", opened its doors for its members to study the Bible as aggressively as Protestants do. This meant that Pope Pius XII encouraged that the Roman Catholics study the original biblical languages (Hebrew, Aramaic, and Greek). Thus new translators of the Bible used the original languages as the textual base instead of Saint Jerome's Latin Vulgate.

The different Protestant churches welcomed the move as this has been their philosophy since William Tyndale translated his very first New Testament in English. The encyclical also encouraged a version of the Holy Scriptures to be jointly translated by Roman Catholic and Protestant scholars, thus giving rise to what they call the Common Bible. Today, the second title (given above) is the most used, as it was approved liturgically not only by the Roman Catholic Church but by many of the other churches as well.

Later in the 1990s, the Philippine Bible Society realised the need to revise the Naimbag a Damag Biblia because of further advancement in linguistic and archaeological knowledge. Hence the birth of Ti Baro a Naimbag a Damag Biblia (The New Good News Bible). Like the earlier version, it used the original languages as the textual base and was jointly translated by Roman Catholic and Protestant scholars.

In December 1993, Jehovah's Witnesses released the Baro a Lubong a Patarus ti Kristiano a Griego a Kasuratan (New World Translation of the Christian Greek Scriptures) in Ilocano alongside Cebuano and Tagalog, though this Bible only have a Christian Greek Scriptures in it. By December 1, 2000, a complete Bible with Hebrew Scriptures and revised Christian Greek Scriptures was released in Tagalog, while Cebuano and Ilocano soon followed. The Bible in Ilocano then became called Baro a Lubong a Patarus ti Nasantuan a Kasuratan (New World Translation of the Holy Scriptures). The translation and references of these 1993 and 2000 editions of the Bible are based on the English 1984 edition of the New World Translation of the Holy Scriptures which was released at the “Kingdom Increase” District Conventions of Jehovah’s Witnesses in 1984 in the United States.

Eight years later, on September 16, 2018, a member of the Governing Body of Jehovah's Witnesses, Mark Sanderson, released the revised edition of the New World Translation of the Holy Scriptures under the same name—Baro a Lubong a Patarus ti Nasantuan a Kasuratan in Ilocano. This Bible is based from the English 2013 revision of the New World Translation of the Holy Scriptures which was released at the 129th annual meeting of the Watch Tower Bible and Tract Society of Pennsylvania on October 5 and 6, 2013 in the Assembly Hall of Jehovah’s Witnesses, Jersey City, New Jersey, U.S.A. This newly revised edition in Ilocano includes the use of more modern and understandable language (look at the chart below), clarified Biblical expression, appendixes, and many more.

== First parts of the Ilocano Bible ==
Although the complete Bible was published only in 1909, some fragments of the Bible were translated as soon as the arrival of the Spaniards in the Islands. In 1620, the very first book in Ilocano was published by Rev. Fr. Francisco Lopez. The book was entitled Doctrina Cristiana en la Lengua Española e Yloca which was aimed to be used for catechism. The Book contained a translation of the Lord's Prayer (entitled Amami) and the Ten Commandments (entitled Daguiti Sangapulo a Bilin).

During the time of the revolution, Don Isabelo de los Reyes, known as the Father of Philippine Socialism, made his translations of the Gospel of Luke while he was jailed in Montijuich Castle in Barcelona, Spain. But because Don Belong was not knowledgeable in the Biblical languages, the BFBS allowed him to use the available Spanish Bibles as a textual base. From this, he also translated the Gospel of John and the Book of Acts. His works were later published in 1989 and 1900 respectively.

== Comparative chart ==
Translation	John (Juan) 3:16
Ti Biblia	Ta cata la unay ti panagayat ti Dios iti lubong; ng̃a intedna ti Anacna a Bugbugtong, tapno amin á mamati kencuana, saan á mapucaw, no di ket adda bigna ng̃a agnanayon.
Ti Baro a Tulag	Gapu iti kasta unay a panagayat ti Dios iti lubong, intedna ti Bugbugtong nga Anakna tapno ti siasinoman a mamati kenkuana saan a matay no di ket agbiag nga agnanayon.
Ti Baro a Naimbag a Damag Biblia	Gapu iti kasta unay a panagayat ti Dios iti lubong, intedna ti Bugbugtong nga Anakna tapno ti siasinoman a mamati kenkuana saan a matay no di ket agbiag nga agnanayon.
Baro a Lubong a Patarus ti Nasantuan a Kasuratan	Ta kasta unay ti panagayat ti Dios iti lubong nga uray la intedna ti bugbugtong nga Anakna, tapno saan a madadael ti asinoman a mangipakita iti pammati kenkuana no di ket maaddaan iti biag nga agnanayon.

== See also ==
- Bible translations by language
- Magandang Balita Biblia
