= Santiago Fonacier =

Filipino bishop, writer and politician (1885–1977)

The Honorable and The Most Reverend Santiago Fonacier, Obispo Máximo II
- Second Supreme Bishop of the Philippine Independent Church
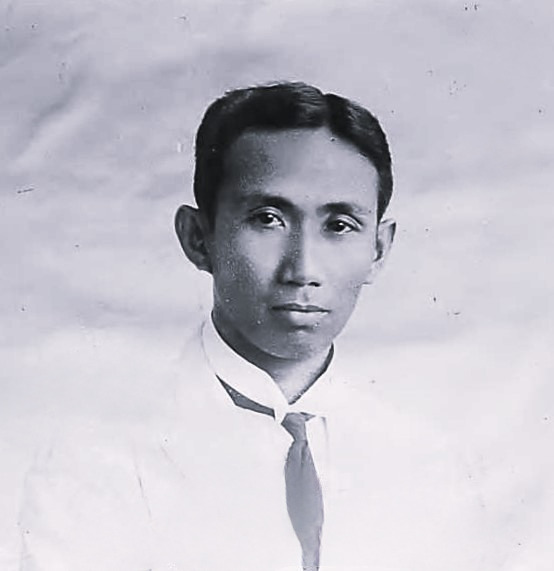
- Fonacier in 1922
- Church: Philippine Independent Church
- See: Tondo; Taft
- Appointed: 14 October 1940
- Installed: 21 November 1940
- Term ended: 21 January 1946
- Predecessor: Gregorio Aglipay
- Successor: Gerardo Bayaca
- Previous posts: Personal secretary of Gregorio Aglipay; Second assigned priest at the IFI Tondo Cathedral

Orders
- Ordination: November 15, 1903; (Priesthood) by Ramon Joaquin Farolan y Paraiso
- Consecration: 12 January 1933; (Episcopate) by Gregorio Aglipay

Personal details
- Born: Santiago Antonio Fonacier y Suguitan; May 21, 1885 Laoag, Ilocos Norte, Captaincy General of the Philippines
- Died: December 8, 1977 (aged 92) Pasay, Metro Manila, Philippines
- Denomination: Aglipayan (Philippine Independent Church/Iglesia Filipina Independiente, Independent Church of Filipino Christians)
- Spouse: Carmen Jamias
- Children: 8
- Occupation: Religious leader, writer, politician

Senator of the Philippines from the 1st District
- In office 3 June 1919 – 2 June 1925 Serving with Vicente Singson Encarnacion (1919-1922), Isabelo de los Reyes (1922-1925)
- Preceded by: Juan Villamor
- Succeeded by: Elpidio Quirino

Member of the Philippine Assembly from Ilocos Norte's 1st district
- In office 16 October 1912 – 16 October 1916
- Preceded by: Irineo Javier
- Succeeded by: Vicente Llanes (as Representative)

Personal details
- Party: Nacionalista
- Other political affiliations: Partido Modernista
- Styles
- Reference style: His Eminence
- Spoken style: Your Eminence
- Religious style: Obispo Máximo II; Monsignor; Bishop
- Posthumous style: The Most Reverend

Santiago Antonio Fonacier y Suguitan (May 21, 1885 – December 8, 1977) was a Filipino priest, bishop, writer, educator, and politician who became a senator and the second Obispo Maximo of the Iglesia Filipina Independiente, also informally known as the Aglipayan Church.

== Early life ==
Santiago Fonacier was born in Laoag, Ilocos Norte on May 21, 1885 to Dionisio Antonino Fonacier y Romero and Feliciana Suguitan y Manuel. He studied his secondary education and took a bachelor of arts course at the Escuela Docente de Laoag which was then accredited by the University of Santo Tomas and the Liceo de Manila. He was one of the pioneering seminarians of the nationalist church Iglesia Filipina Independiente (IFI), entering one of its earliest seminaries in Ilocos Norte in October 1902, shortly after witnessing the consecration of Bishop Pedro Brillantes. There, he studied under the tutelage of Rev. Fr. Servando Castro before later moving to Manila to continue and complete his remaining theological training at another IFI seminary. In dire need of priests, he was ordained as a deacon and, shortly after, as a priest in November 1903 at age 18.

== Literary career ==
During his priesthood, he taught for two years in the primary grade at the Instituto Docente (formerly the Escuela Docente de Laoag), his secondary school alma mater, but left teaching to concentrate on journalism. He edited and translated Spanish periodicals and Jose Rizal’s two novels, Noli Me Tangere and El Filibusterismo into Ilocano. He later on became a reporter for the newspapers La Democracia and El Grito del Pueblo.

== Political career ==
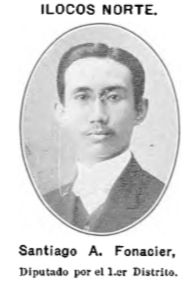
Fonacier as member of the Philippine Assembly, c. 1913

Fonacier took a leave from active priestly ministry from 1912 to 1931. In 1912, Fonacier was elected to the Philippine Assembly as representative of the first district of Ilocos Norte, serving until 1916. He won by majority against Irineo Javier of the Nacionalista and Julio Agcaoili of the Progresista Party. In 1919, he was elected to the Philippine Senate to represent the first district, composed of Abra, Batanes, Cagayan, Ilocos Sur, Ilocos Norte and Isabela.

He was also a member of the Board of Regents of the University of the Philippines, the Philippine Independence missions to the United States, and a member of the Institute of National Textbook Board.

== Religious and clerical career ==
Fonacier was an early follower of the schismatic Iglesia Filipina Independiente (IFI) founded by Isabelo de los Reyes and Gregorio Aglipay in 1902. He served as personal secretary to Aglipay at one point. He also became a military chaplain and was assigned priest at the first national cathedral of the IFI, the "Tondo Cathedral" in Tondo, Manila. He was consecrated as bishop in January 1933. He was elected in accordance with the constitution of the church and became the church's second Obispo Maximo (Supreme Bishop) after Aglipay's death in 1940 and served until 1946. Just like his predecessor Aglipay, he was a firm adherent of the Unitarianism theology. Fonacier spearheaded the establishment of the now-defunct Iglesia Filipina Independiente Central Seminary (IFICS) which used to be located at 1108 Taft Avenue in Manila and served the seminary training of the church's aspiring priests until the mid 1940s.

Fonacier's tenure as Supreme Bishop was mired in challenges and controversy. Having had to lead the IFI during the Second World War and the Japanese occupation, he also faced dissent within the church's ranks, which surfaced after the war when Fonacier asked a bishop to transfer from the Diocese of Cavite to Cebu. This led to a Supreme Council of Bishops meeting on December 4, 1945, which charged him with violating the IFI's Constitution in consecrating bishops, moving the church headquarters to another town and failing to give an accounting of church funds. The following year, he was dismissed from office by the council. After losing a legal challenge against his successors, Fonacier seceded from the IFI and established the Independent Church of Filipino Christians (ICFC) in 1955, which later became a member of the International Association for Religious Freedom (IARF), and which also later produced another separate denomination called "Aglipay Memorial Church" (AMC). The ICFC and AMC remained Unitarian.

A polarizing figure in the church's history, on December 8, 2020, then-IFI Obispo Maximo Rhee Timbang released an official church statement commemorating Fonacier's 43rd death anniversary, "to celebrate his life and ministry, and remember his contribution". The statement emphasized on urging its congregation "to give it with distinction to seek and extend forgiveness and understanding, to offer and reach-out for love and reconciliation", as well as "thanking God for the life and ministry of Fonacier".

== Personal life and death ==
Also nicknamed "Ago", Santiago Fonacier was married to Carmen Marcelina Amor Jamias – who was introduced to him by Gregorio Aglipay – in September 1909 and had eight children. Jamias was a niece of Aglipay's wife, Pilar. Fonacier's son Anos was a lawyer, entrepreneur and philanthropist who was best known by the moniker, the "Father of Bohol Tourism" and "Father of Cebu's Tourism Industry". Fonacier was also related to former Philippine Air Force general and columnist Ramon Farolan through his wife Carmen who was the sister of Farolan's mother.

Fonacier died aged 92 on December 8, 1977. He was featured in a 1985 commemorative stamp in the Philippines.

Aglipayan Church titles
Preceded by Gregorio Aglipay	Supreme Bishop of the Philippine Independent Church; 14 October 1940 – 21 January 1946	Succeeded by Gerardo Bayaca
