= Pascual H. Poblete =

Filipino writer and linguist

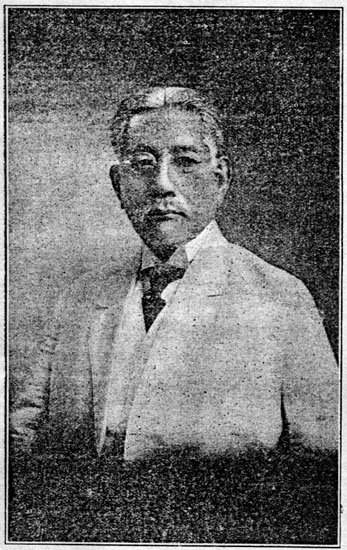
- Poblete's portrait
- Born: Pascual Hicaro y Poblete; May 17, 1857; Naic, Cavite, Captaincy General of the Philippines
- Died: February 5, 1921 (aged 63); Manila, Philippine Islands
- Resting place: Manila North Cemetery
- Occupation: Writer

Pascual H. Poblete (Filipino: Pascual Poblete Hicaro; May 17, 1857—February 5, 1921) was a Filipino writer, journalist, and linguist, remarkably noted as the first translator of the Bible and José Rizal's novel Noli Me Tangere into the Tagalog language.

Poblete was well known for organizing the semi-clandestine short-lived earlier Partido Nacionalista which existed from August 28, 1901, until 1907. He was also a member of Unión Obrera Democrática Filipina, the first-ever labor union federation in the Philippines, and was one of the founding and pioneering members of the Philippine Independent Church.

He and Marcelo H. del Pilar founded in 1882 the Diariong Tagalog, the first bilingual newspaper in the Philippines. He edited the Tagalog section while Marcelo H. del Pilar did the Spanish section. Poblete is popularly referred as the "Father of the Revolutionary Philippine Newspaper" and "Father of Tagalog Newspaper".

[(block)]

== Early life and education ==
Pascual H. Poblete was born Pascual Hicaro y Poblete on May 17, 1857, to Filipinos Francisco Hicaro and María Poblete in 1857 at Naic, Cavite. He had later personally preferred to use his mother's surname as his last name. He graduated Bachelor of Arts at the Liceo de Manila. He was a pro-feminist.

== Personal life and death ==
Poblete married Leonicia Rieta of Manila, with whom he had five children. Poblete remarried after the death of Rieta. His second wife was Rafaela Alemany, a Spanish, by whom he had seven children.

Poblete died of a heart attack in Manila on February 5, 1921, at age 63.
