= Benton Hall (Miami University) =

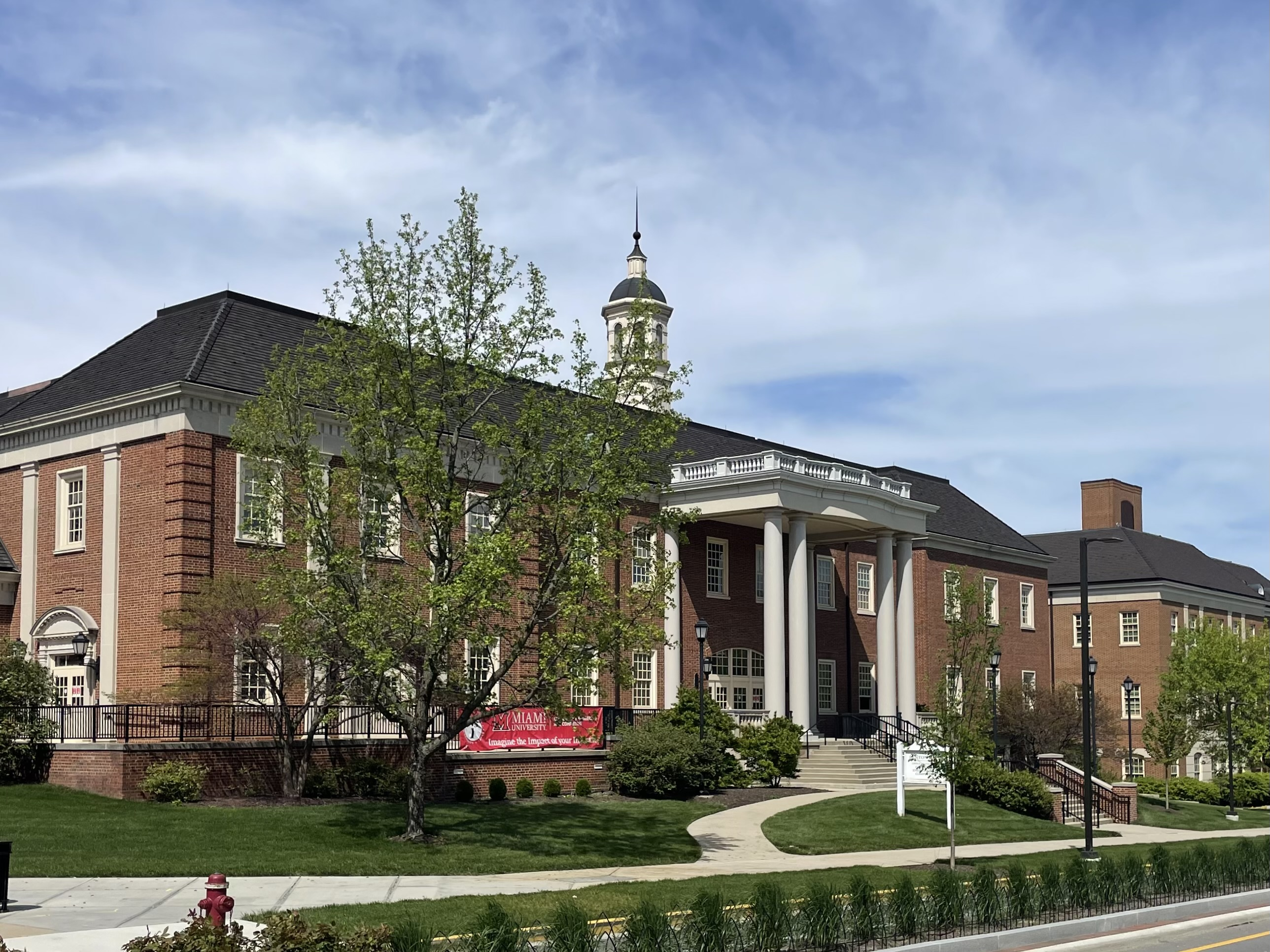

General information
- Type: Academic
- Architectural style: Georgian
- Location: Oxford, Ohio, US
- Coordinates: 39°30′38.42″N 84°44′2.89″W
- Current tenants: School of Engineering
- Year(s) built: 1968
- Cost: $8,961,000.00

Technical details
- Floor area: 82,661 sq ft (7,679.5 m^{2})

Design and construction
- Architect(s): Burt Hill/SFA
- Main contractor: G.C. Messer Construction

Benton Hall is an academic building located on the campus of Miami University in Oxford, Ohio. Designed for the university's psychology department, it now houses departments of the College of Engineering and Computing. It was built in 1968 in the Georgian Revival style.

== Design and construction ==
The new Benton Hall on the northeast corner of High Street and Tallawanda Avenue was to provide facilities for the Department of Psychology. It includes 2 lecture halls, 3 classrooms, 5 instructional laboratories, a library, 114 other teaching and research facilities, 19 supporting rooms and shops, and 33 offices. Benton Hall now houses the central office of the College of Engineering and Computing. The College of Engineering and Computing, formerly the School of Engineering and Applied Science, was created in 1959 to provide professionally oriented programs within Miami's liberal arts tradition.

== Guy Potter Benton ==
Benton Hall is named for Guy Potter Benton, president of Miami University from 1902 to 1911. One of the Miami's greatest presidents, the 11th president Guy Potter Benton was born in Kenton Ohio on May 26, 1856. Before coming to Miami in 1902, Benton served as superintendent of schools in Fort Scott, Kansas, professor of history and sociology at Baker University, and president of Upper Iowa University. As Miami University’s president, Benton presided over the beginning of Miami's evolution from a small rural institution into a thriving modern university. The year Benton became president there were but five buildings on the campus and the total student enrollment was 124. When he resigned nine years later, the student enrollment had increased to more than 1,200. Many of the new students were women enrolled at the Normal School which opened during Benton's tenure.

By 1911, Miami's income had grown to approximately a quarter of a million dollars, and seven modern buildings had been erected in response to a constantly growing University constituency.

President Benton was also largely responsible for the defeat of the Lybarger Bill, one of the greatest threats ever posed to Miami's existence as a university. Introduced in the Ohio Legislature in 1906 and promoted by Ohio State President William Oxley Thompson (a former Miami University president), the Lybarger Bill would have reduced Miami to the status of a teacher's college. Benton actively and successfully lobbied legislators to defeat the Bill.

Following his departure from Miami, Benton was president of the University of Vermont from 1911 to 1917, and he served with the American Expeditionary Force in Europe from 1917 to 1919. In 1921 Benton became the first president of the University of the Philippines. Ill health forced his retirement three years later and he died in Minneapolis on June 28, 1927. In accordance with his wishes, Guy Porter Benton was buried in the Oxford Cemetery.
