= Guy Potter Benton =

American college president

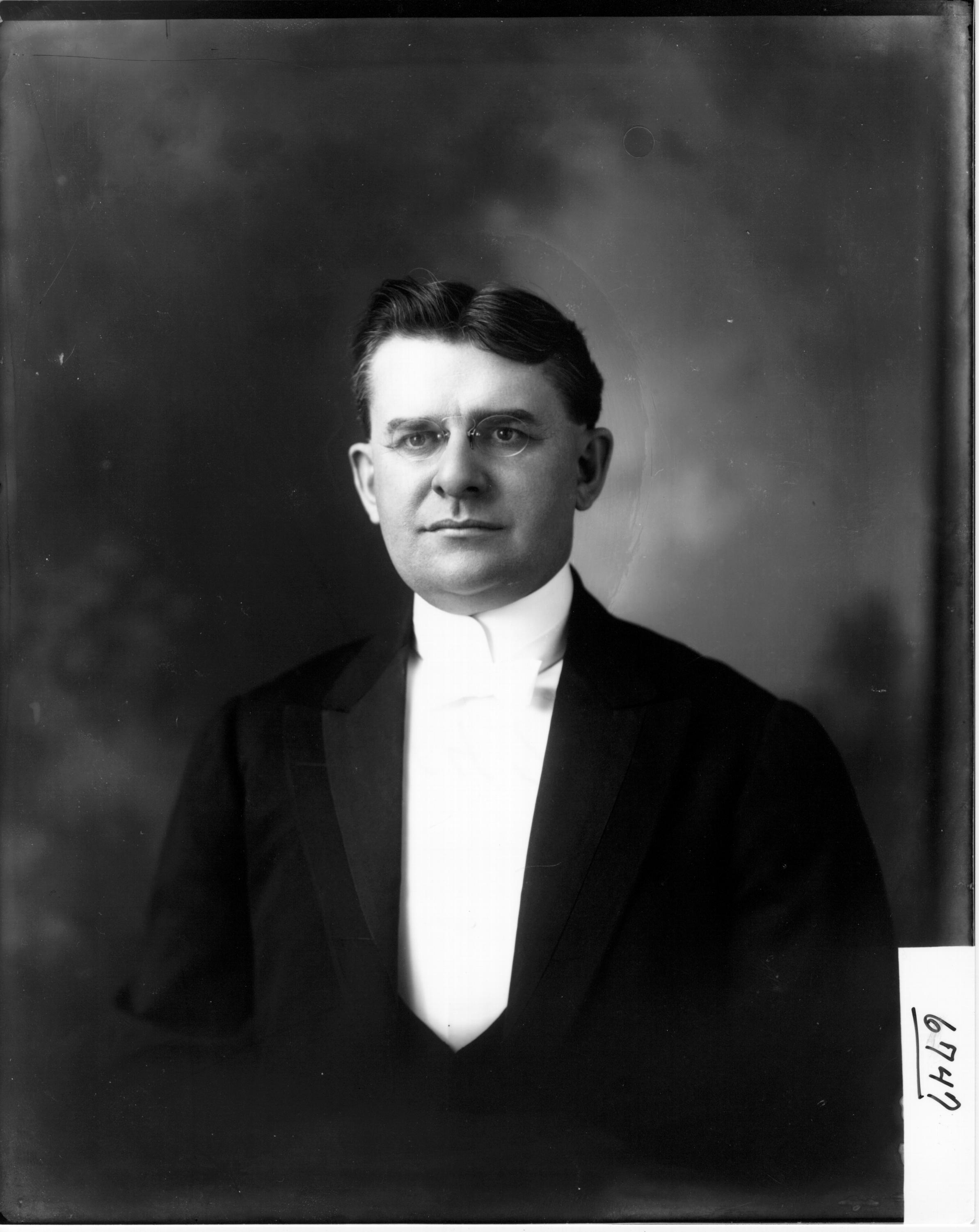

3rd President of the University of the Philippines
- In office 1921–1923
- Preceded by: Ignacio Villamor
- Succeeded by: Rafael V. Palma

President of University of Vermont
- In office 1911–1920

President of Miami University
- In office 1902–1911

President of Upper Iowa University
- In office 1898–1902

Personal details
- Born: Guy Potter Wharton Benton; May 26, 1865 Kenton, Ohio, U.S
- Died: June 29, 1927 (aged 62) Minneapolis, Minnesota, U.S
- Education: Ohio Northern University; Ohio Wesleyan University; Baker University; College of Wooster.
- Profession: College president and educator

Guy Potter Benton (May 26, 1865 – June 29, 1927) was an American educator who was president of Upper Iowa University, Miami University, the University of Vermont, and the University of the Philippines. He was instrumental in the founding of Delta Zeta sorority at Miami University in 1902.

== Early life ==
Benton was born in Kenton, Ohio. His parents were Harriet (née Wharton) and Daniel Webster Benton.He attended Ohio Normal University (now Ohio Northern University), Ohio Wesleyan University, Baker University and the College of Wooster. At Ohio Wesleyan, he was a member of Phi Delta Theta fraternity.

== Career ==
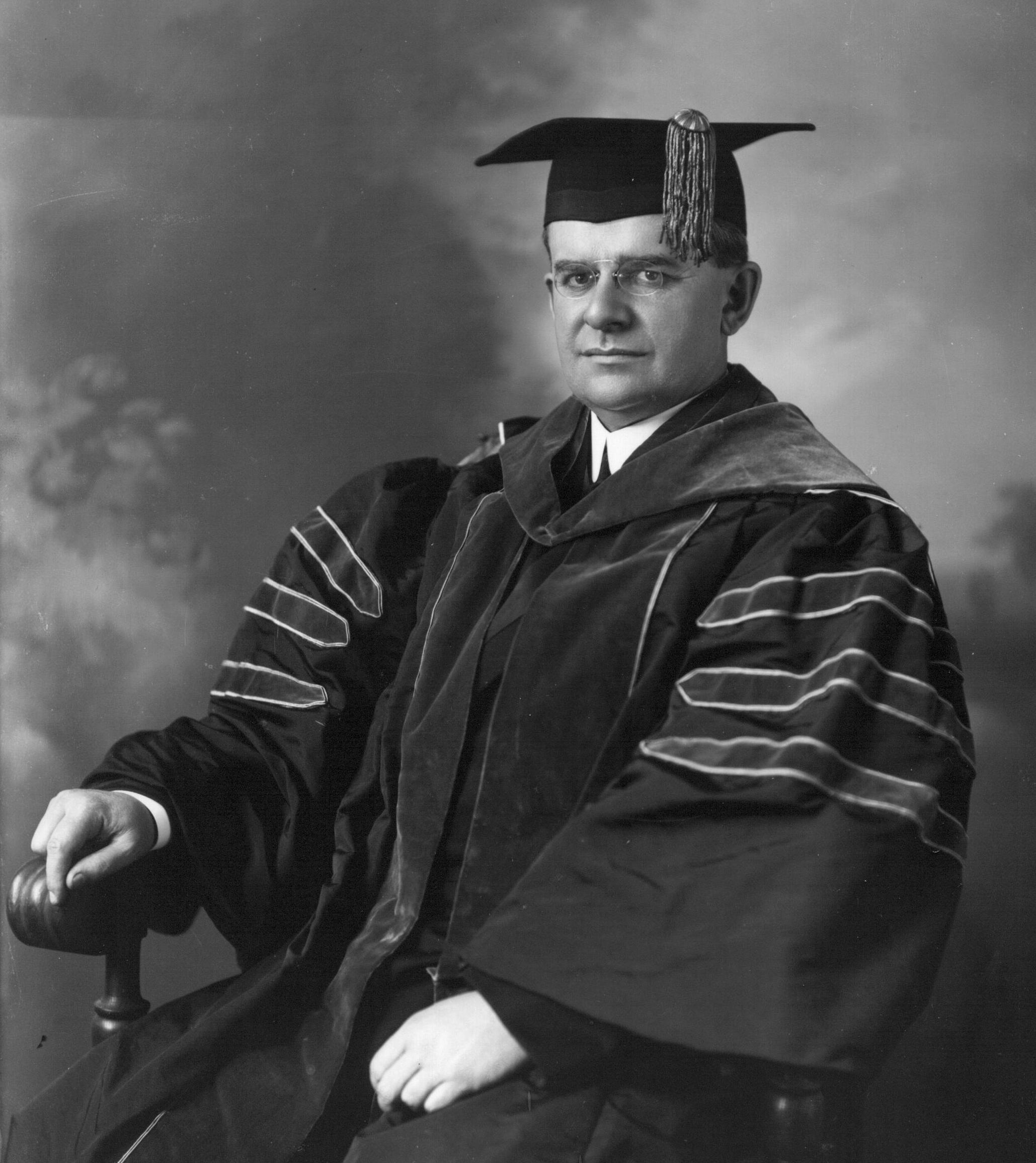
Benton in Miami University regalia, 1909

After college, Benton became an ordained Methodist minister. He served as superintendent of schools at Fort Scott, Kansas from 1890 to 1895. He became assistant state superintendent of public instruction in Kansas from 1895 to 1896.

He was a professor of history and sociology at Baker University from 1896 to 1899. He became president of Upper Iowa University in 1899, serving until 1902 when he became president of Miami University. While at Miami, he helped form the Delta Zeta sorority in 1902. He left Miami in 1911 to become president of the University of Vermont from 1911 to 1919.

He was the educational director of the Third Army occupying Germany following World War I. For his service during the war, he was awarded the Army Distinguished Service Medal and his commendation reads, in part, "As Director in charge of the Educational Work undertaken in the Third Army of the American Expeditionary Forces, by his marked ability, untiring energy, and loyal devotion to his task, Dr. Benton contributed in a large measure to the successful results obtained in this vast undertaking. Through his great work among 10,000 illiterate soldiers over 8,000 of them were taught to read and write. By his efforts, he has rendered services of particular worth to the American Expeditionary Forces."

He served as the third president of the University of the Philippines from 1921 to 1925

== Honors ==
- Benton was named Grand Patron of the Delta Zeta sorority; he was the only man permitted to wear the Delta Zeta member badge.
- Two buildings on the Miami University campus have been named for Benton. First was the administration building and auditorium now known as Hall Auditorium and the current Benton Hall is an engineering building.

== Personal life ==
In 1889, Benton married Dolla Konantz of Arcadia, Kansas. They had two daughters, Helen Geneva (Mrs. Dwight E. Minnich) and Pauline Corinth Benton.

Benton was the national president of Phi Delta Theta from 1912 to 1914. He was also a member of the forensics honorary Tau Kappa Alpha and served as its national president from 1915 to 1917.

Benton died in Minneapolis, Minnesota and is buried next to his wife in the Miami University plot of the Oxford Cemetery and his headstone indicates that he was "President of Miami University" and "National President of Phi Delta Theta Fraternity."

== Sources ==
- Encyclopedia Vermont Biography: A Series of Authentic Biographical Sketches of the Representative Men of Vermont and Sons of Vermont in Other States. Dodge. Burlington: Ullery, 1912, p 118-119

Preceded by David Stanton Tappan	President of Miami University; 1902 – 1911	Succeeded by Raymond M. Hughes
Preceded by Ignacio B. Villamor	President of the University of the Philippines; 1921–1925	Succeeded by Rafael V. Palma
