= Marcelino Crisólogo =

Filipino politician, poet, writer, playwright (1844–1927)

Marcelino "Mena" Crisólogo
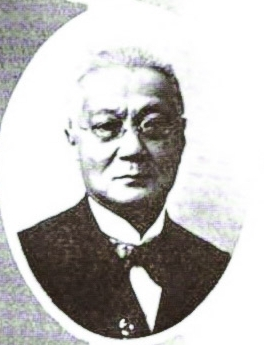
- Portrait as governor, published c. 1905, by the United States Bureau of the Census

1st Governor of Ilocos Sur
- In office 1901–1906
- Preceded by: Position established
- Succeeded by: Felix Angco

Member of the Malolos Congress from Ilocos Sur
- In office September 15, 1898 – March 23, 1901 Serving with Mariano Fos, Ignacio Villamor, and Francisco Tongson

Personal details
- Born: Marcelino Crisólogo y Pecson; November 11, 1844 Vigan, Ilocos Sur, Captaincy General of the Philippines
- Died: July 5, 1927 (aged 82)
- Occupation: politician, playwright, writer and poet

Marcelino Pecson Crisólogo (born Marcelino Crisólogo y Pecson; 11 November 1844 – 5 July 1927), also known as Mena Crisólogo, was a Filipino politician, poet, writer and playwright. He was known for being one of the representatives for Ilocos Sur in the Malolos Congress and being of one of the signatories of the Malolos Constitution. Born in Vigan, he became the first governor of Ilocos Sur and he popularized Ilocano art and literature. As a dramatist, he wrote a zarzuela entitled Codigo Municipal. One of his works, Mining wenno Ayat ti Kararwa is comparable to Noli me tangere, a novel by Philippine patriot José Rizal. He translated Don Quixote into the Ilocano language as Don Calixtofaro de la Kota Caballero de la Luna.

In 1904, Crisólogo also took part in the Louisiana Purchase Exposition at St. Louis, Missouri, United States as one of delegation of governors. He continued writing comedies and zarzuelas and promoting Ilocano art and literature after the end of his term as governor.

Being one of the most respected Ilocanos, one of the streets of Vigan City was named after him. The heart of Vigan City, a designated UNESCO World Heritage Site, is the half-kilometer Calle Crisologo or Mena Crisologo Street. He was married to Felipa Florentino and the mother of Philippine women's literature, Leona Florentino, was his sister-in-law.
