= Ignacio Villamor =

Filipino lawyer (1863–1933)

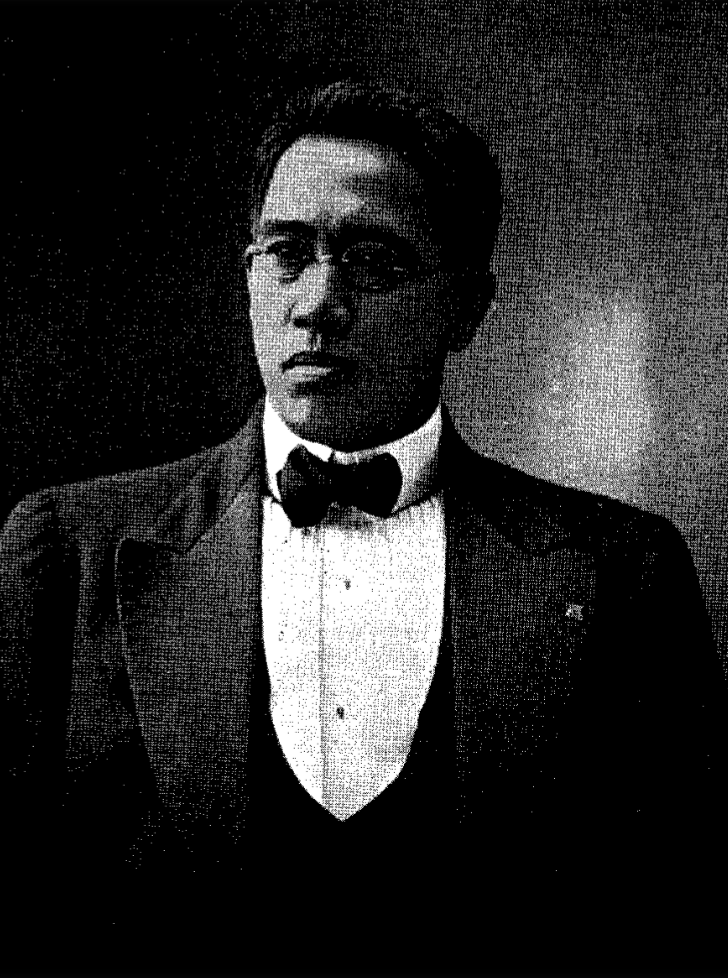
- Portrait as President of the University of the Philippines, published by the Philippine Education, c. 1915

Associate Justice of the Supreme Court
- In office May 19, 1920 – May 25, 1933
- Appointed by: Woodrow Wilson
- Preceded by: Florentino Torres
- Succeeded by: Ramón Avanceña

Solicitor General of the Philippines
- In office July 17, 1906 – July 1, 1908
- Preceded by: Gregorio S. Araneta
- Succeeded by: George R. Harvey

Attorney General of the Philippines
- In office July 1, 1908 – June 30, 1914
- Preceded by: Gregorio S. Araneta
- Succeeded by: Ramon Avanceña

2nd President of the University of the Philippines
- In office 1915–1921
- Preceded by: Murray S. Bartlett
- Succeeded by: Guy Potter Benton

Member of the Malolos Congress from Ilocos Sur
- In office September 15, 1898 – March 23, 1901 Serving with Mariano Fos, Francisco Tongson, and Mena Crisologo

Personal details
- Born: February 1, 1863 Bangued, Abra, Captaincy General of the Philippines, Spanish East Indies
- Died: May 23, 1933 (aged 70) Manila, Philippine Islands, U.S.
- Resting place: La Loma Cemetery
- Spouse: Mariquita Flores
- Relations: Jesus Antonio Villamor (son)
- Profession: Lawyer

Ignacio Villamor y Borbón (February 1, 1863 – May 23, 1933) was a Filipino lawyer, Associate Justice of Supreme Court from Abra, Philippines and the first Filipino president of the University of the Philippines. Justice Villamor is also the father of the World War II Filipino aviation hero, and 6th Pursuit Squadron Commander, Capt. Jesús A. Villamor of the Philippine Army Air Corps.

== Early life ==
Villamor was born in Bangued, Abra on February 1, 1863 to parents Florencio Villamor y García and Wenceslawa Borbón. His father died when he was young. Wanting to be a priest, he attended at the Seminario Conciliar of Vigan, Ilocos Sur but did not push through with the vocation.

In 1882, he studied at the San Juan de Letran in Manila and acquired a bachelor's and master's degrees. At the University of Santo Tomas, he acquired his law degree in March 1893 while completing two-year work on literature and philosophy at the same time. Married to Mariquita Flores, he was the father of five children, including the decorated war veteran Jesus Antonio Villamor.

== Career ==
=== Academe ===
He established the College of San Antonio de Padua in 1889, and he was his province's delegate to the Malolos Congress and participated in the drafting of the new Philippine constitution, particularly on the provision of universal education for all. Together with Enrique Mendiola, he co-founded the Liceo de Manila on June 29, 1900, where he was a professor and secretary.

=== Judiciary ===
On February 16, 1901, he served as prosecuting fiscal of Pangasinan and then judge of the Court of First Instance of the sixth judicial district, which was composed of Cavite, Laguna, and Tayabas. He then was appointed as Solicitor General from July 17, 1906 to July 1, 1908

In July 1907, Philippine Independence Leader Macario Sakay and his group surrendered under a promise of general amnesty but were later arrested in a deceitful entrapment by American authorities. At the trial at the Court of First Instance, with the use of false witnesses, Sakay and his men were accused of robbery in band, murder, rape, summary executions, arson, kidnapping under the Brigand Act.

On Aug. 6, 1907, Judge Ignacio Villamor (who would become UP president) convicted them. Sakay was later hanged.

Villamor was appointed as Attorney General of the Philippines from July 1, 1908 to June 30, 1914.

=== Government ===
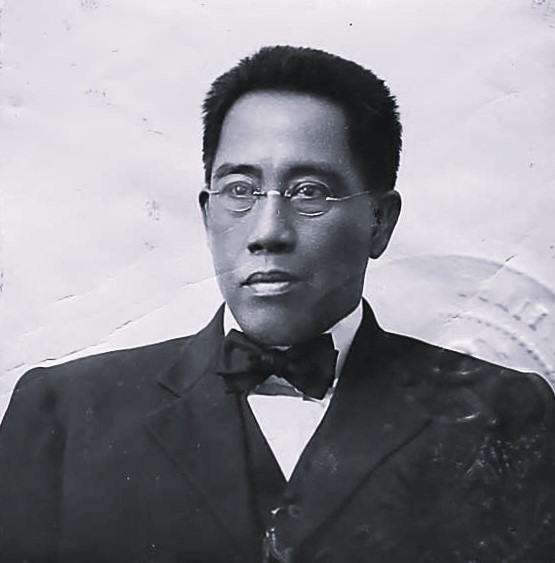
Villamor on his U.S. passport application in 1916

In 1913, Villamor became the Philippine Commission Executive Secretary of the Philippine Islands and director of the Bureau of Customs on 1918.

=== University of the Philippines ===
He was appointed the president of the University of the Philippines (UP) in 1915, becoming its first Filipino president when he replaced American Murray Bartlett. The school expanded during his term, adding new units like Conservatory of Music and opening the College of Education and the University High School. The Junior College of Liberal Arts in Cebu City was also established. Through the initiative of then Cebu Governor Manuel Roa who petitioned for its establishment on April 30, 1918, it was created by virtue of Act No. 2759 that was backed up by Speaker of the Philippine Commission Sergio Osmeña. When the college opened on July 1, 1918, its first registrar was Paulino Gullas with Dr. Lawrence Wharton as first dean.

Villamor was replaced by Guy Potter Benton as UP President.

=== Supreme Court ===
After his term at the University of the Philippines ended, he served as Associate Justice of the Supreme Court in 1921 and remained in the position until his retirement.

=== Author ===
Throughout his career, he had written several published works including Commentaries on the Election Law, Election Frauds and Their Remedies, and others.

== Death ==
He died on May 23, 1933.

== Publication ==
- Criminality in the Philippine Islands
- Commentaries on the Election Law
- Election Frauds and Their Remedies
- Japan’s Educational Development
- Slavery in the Philippines
- Industrious Men
- Ancient Filipino Writing
- The University of Santo Tomas in Her Third Century.

== Historical commemoration ==
- Through City Ordinance No. 594 that was enacted on July 10, 1967, the Justice Ignacio Villamor Street, which stretches from Justice Abad Santos up to Gochan Subdivision, Barangay Kasambagan, Cebu City, was named in his honor.
- Villamor Hall, the University Theater of the University of the Philippines Diliman, was named after him.
