= Diariong Tagalog =

Patriotic Philippines newspaper in Tagalog and Spanish

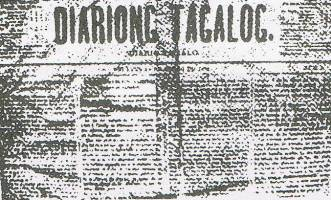
An excerpt from the newspaper

Diariong Tagalog (lit. Tagalog Newspaper) was a patriotic newspaper in Tagalog and Spanish published during the Spanish occupation of the Philippines. It was founded by Marcelo H. del Pilar, Basilio Teodoro Morán, and Pascual H. Poblete in 1882, while Francisco Calvo y Múñoz funded the printing of the newspaper. Diariong Tagalog was the first newspaper to publish articles urging government reform and denouncing the abuse of the Spanish friars. The newspaper lasted for 5 months since its first issue appeared on July 1 of the same year.

== Contents ==
Del Pilar edited the newspaper and published the grievances of the oppressed and the continuation of reform in the Spanish government. Jose Rizal wrote for Diariong Tagalog a patriotic essay titled "El Amor Patrio" (lit. Love of Country) using the pseudonym Laong Laan. It was translated to Tagalog by del Pilar and appeared in the newspaper on August 20, 1882.

Diariong Tagalog has been resurrected in an online format through Negosentro Media in 2023.
