= 1946 Philippine general election =

- April 23, 1946
- Presidential election
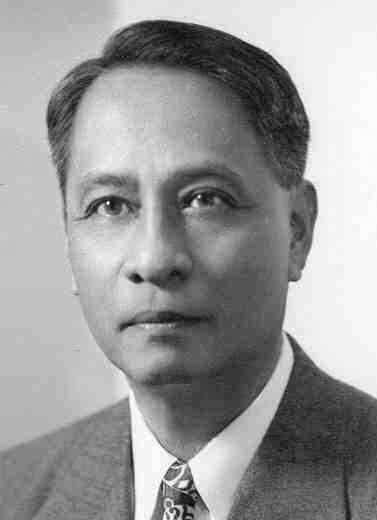

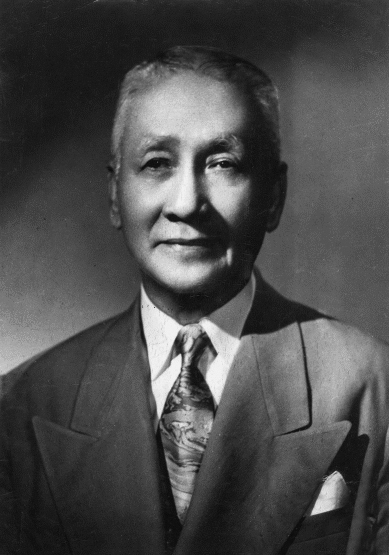
Nominee	Manuel Roxas	Sergio Osmeña
Party	Liberal	Nacionalista
Running mate	Elpidio Quirino	Eulogio Rodriguez
Popular vote	1,333,392	1,129,996
Percentage	53.94%	45.71%
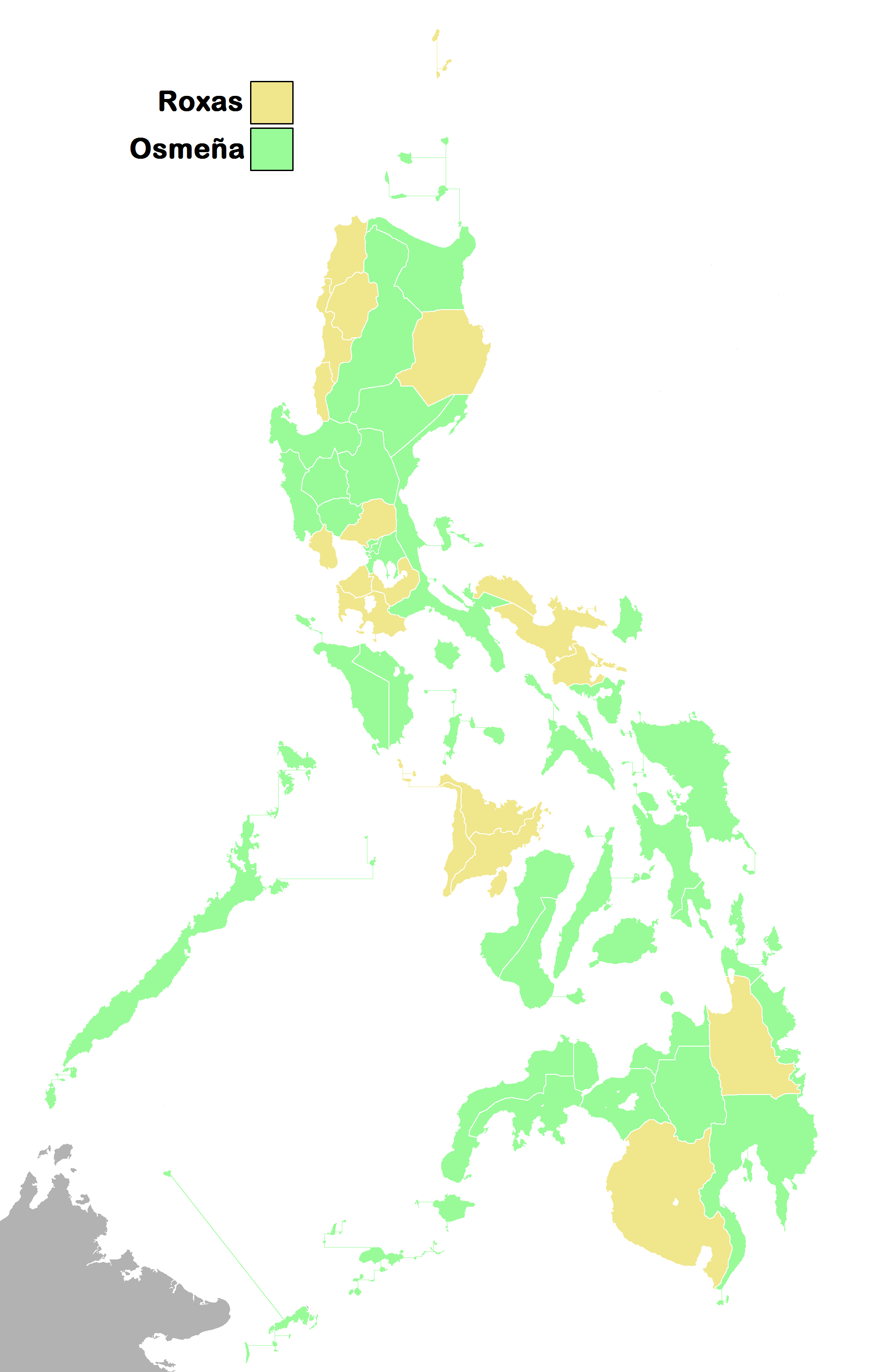
President before election
Sergio Osmeña
Nacionalista
Elected President
Manuel Roxas
Liberal
- Vice presidential election
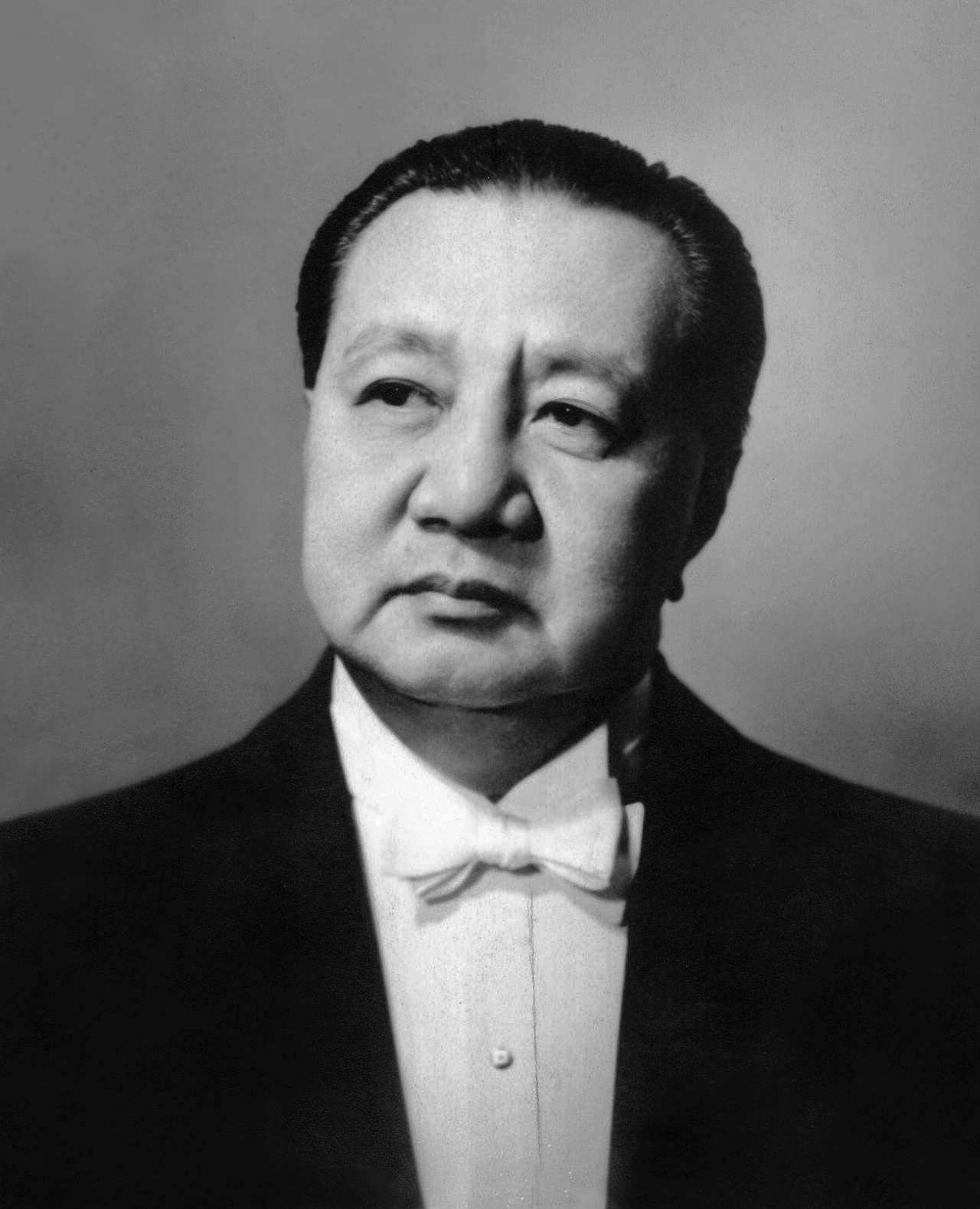

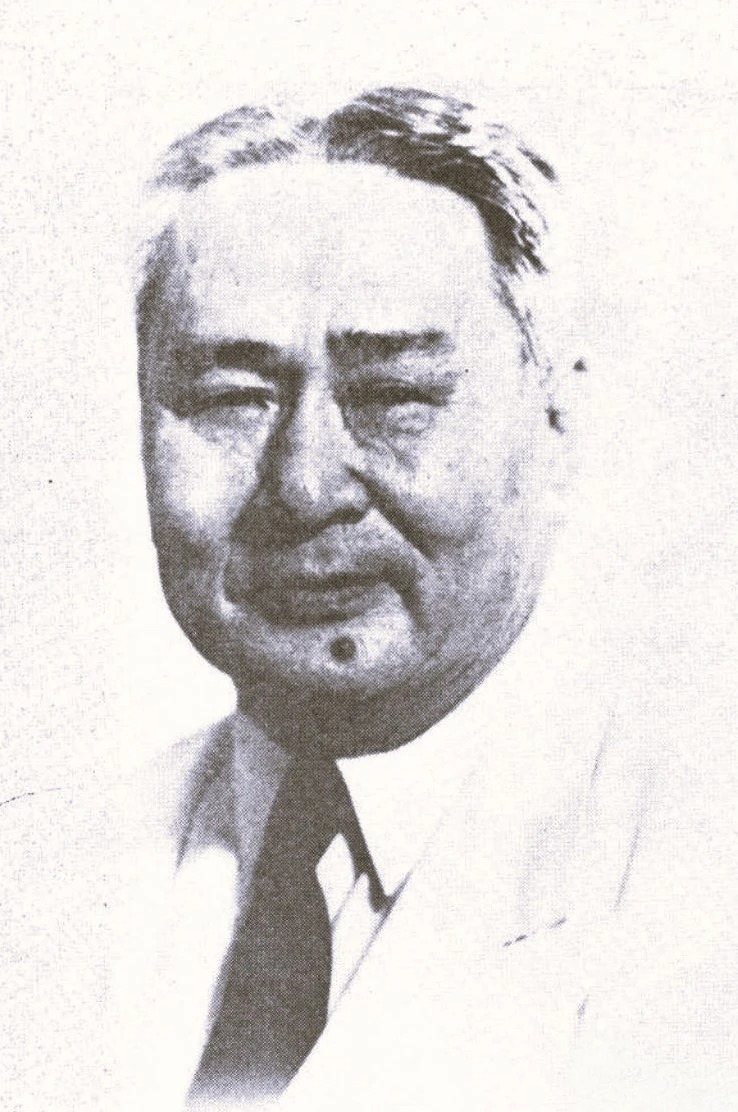
Candidate	Elpidio Quirino	Eulogio Rodriguez
Party	Liberal	Nacionalista
Popular vote	1,161,725	1,051,243
Percentage	52.36%	47.38%
Vice President before election
Vacant
Elected Vice President
Elpidio Quirino
Liberal
- Senate election

16 of the 24 seats in the Philippine Senate 13 needs for a majority
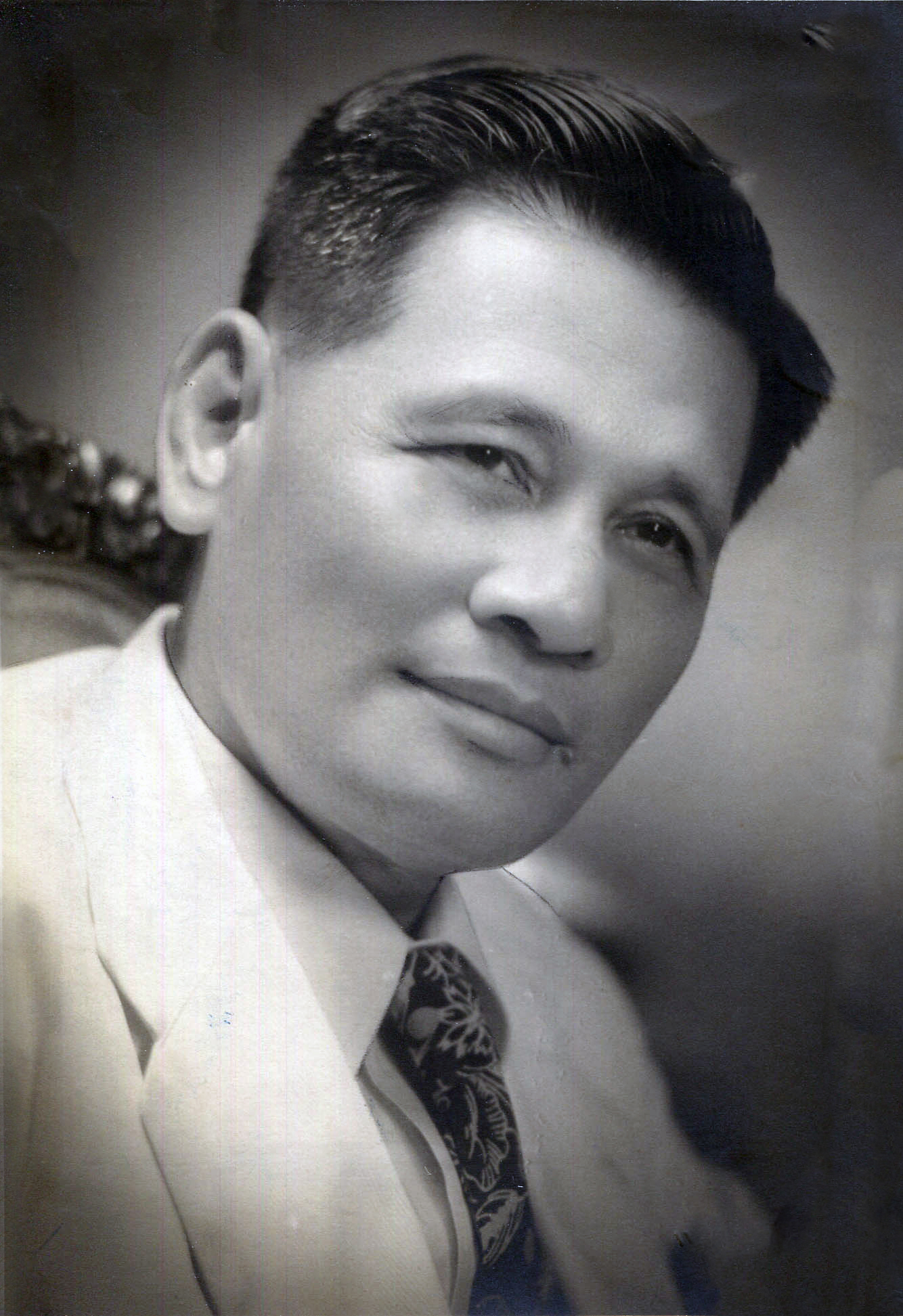

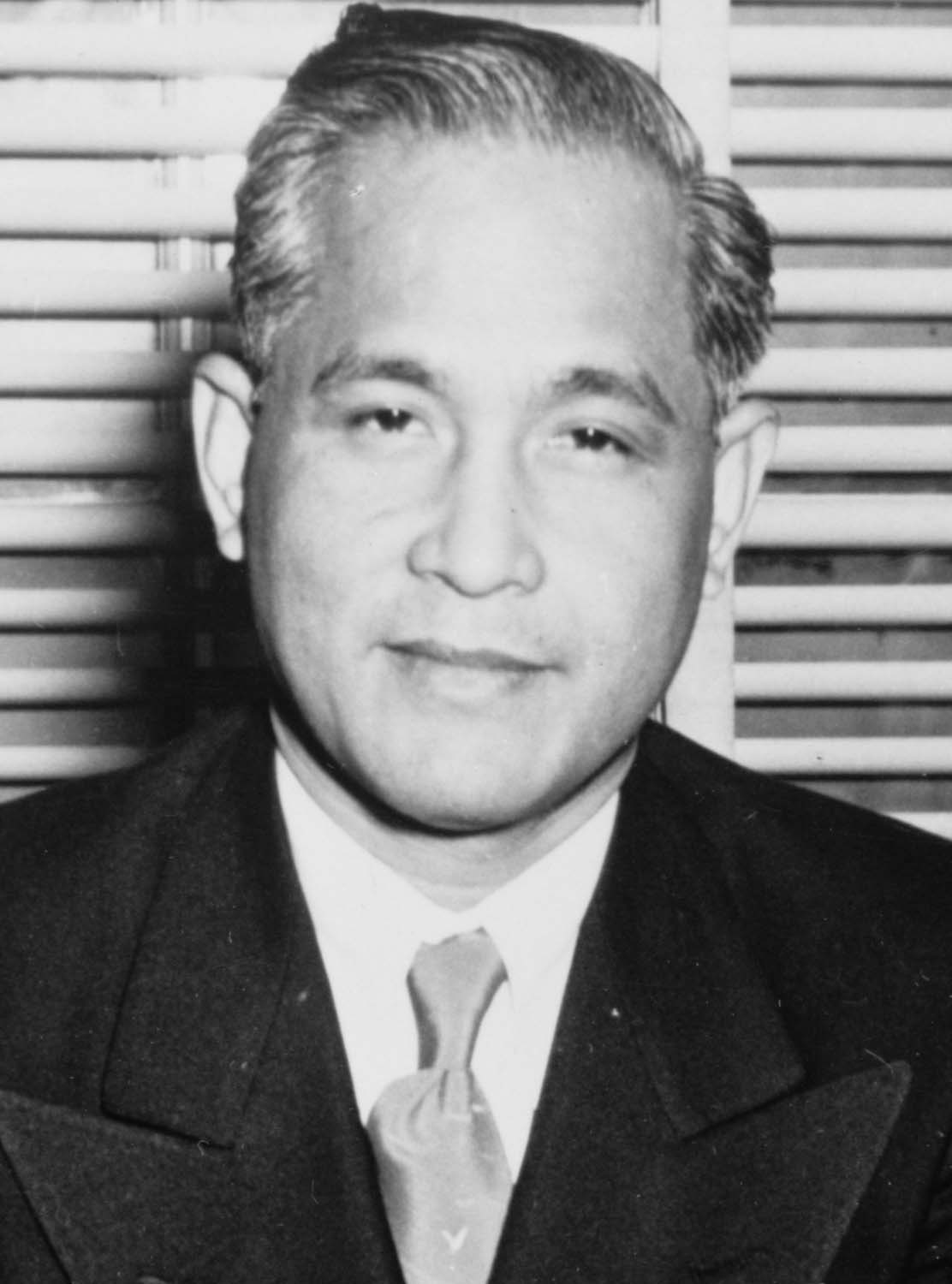

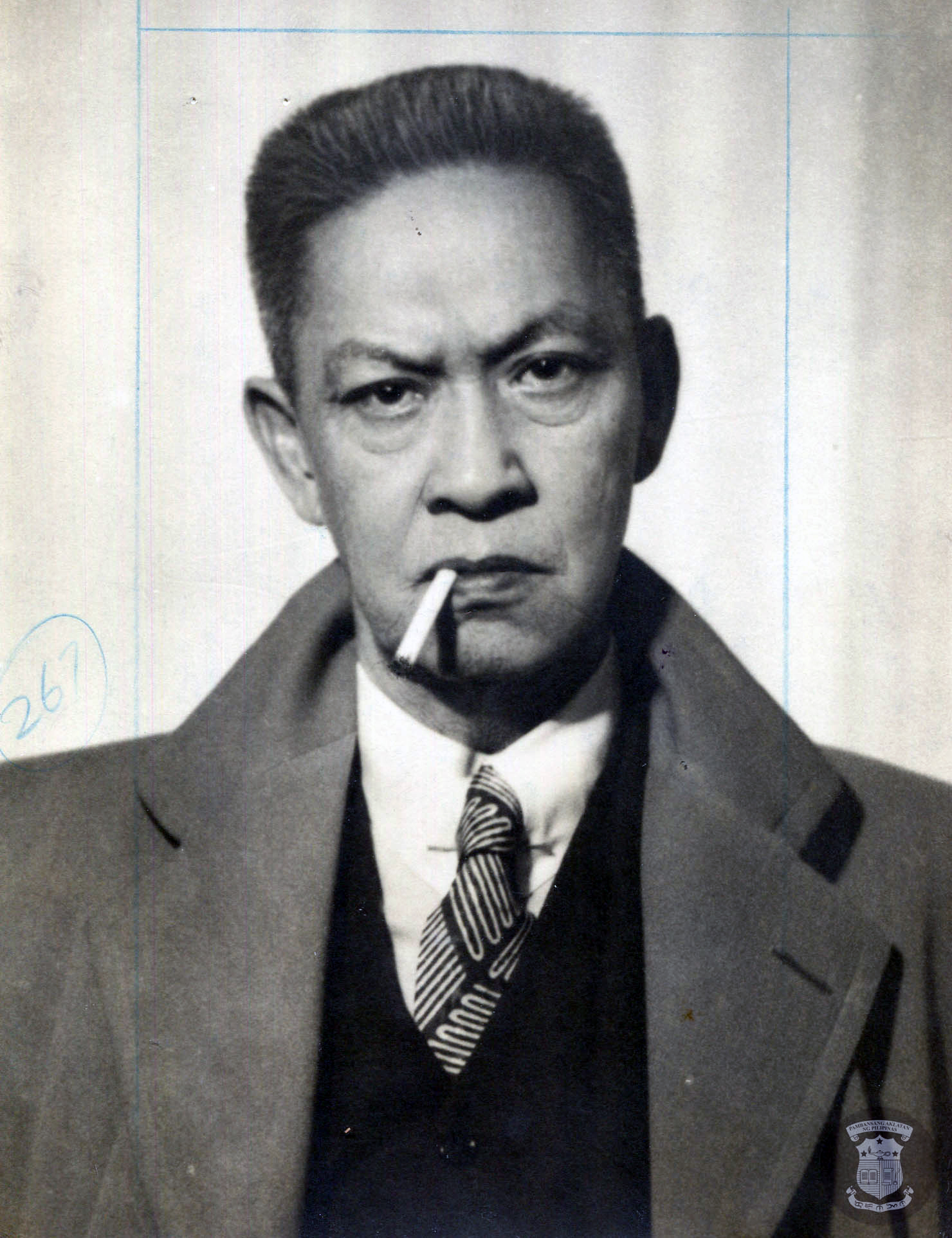
	First party	Second party	Third party
Leader	Jose Avelino	Carlos P. Garcia	Vicente Sotto
Party	Liberal	Nacionalista	Popular Front
Seats before	3 (1 up)	20 (9 up)	0
Seats won	9	6	1
Seats after	10	13	1
Seat change	▲6	▼3	▲1
Popular vote	8,626,965	7,454,074	1,199,138
Percentage	47.26	40.81	6.56
Senate President before election
Manuel Roxas
Liberal
Elected Senate President
José Avelino
Liberal
- House elections

All 98 seats in the House of Representatives of the Philippines 50 seats needed for a majority
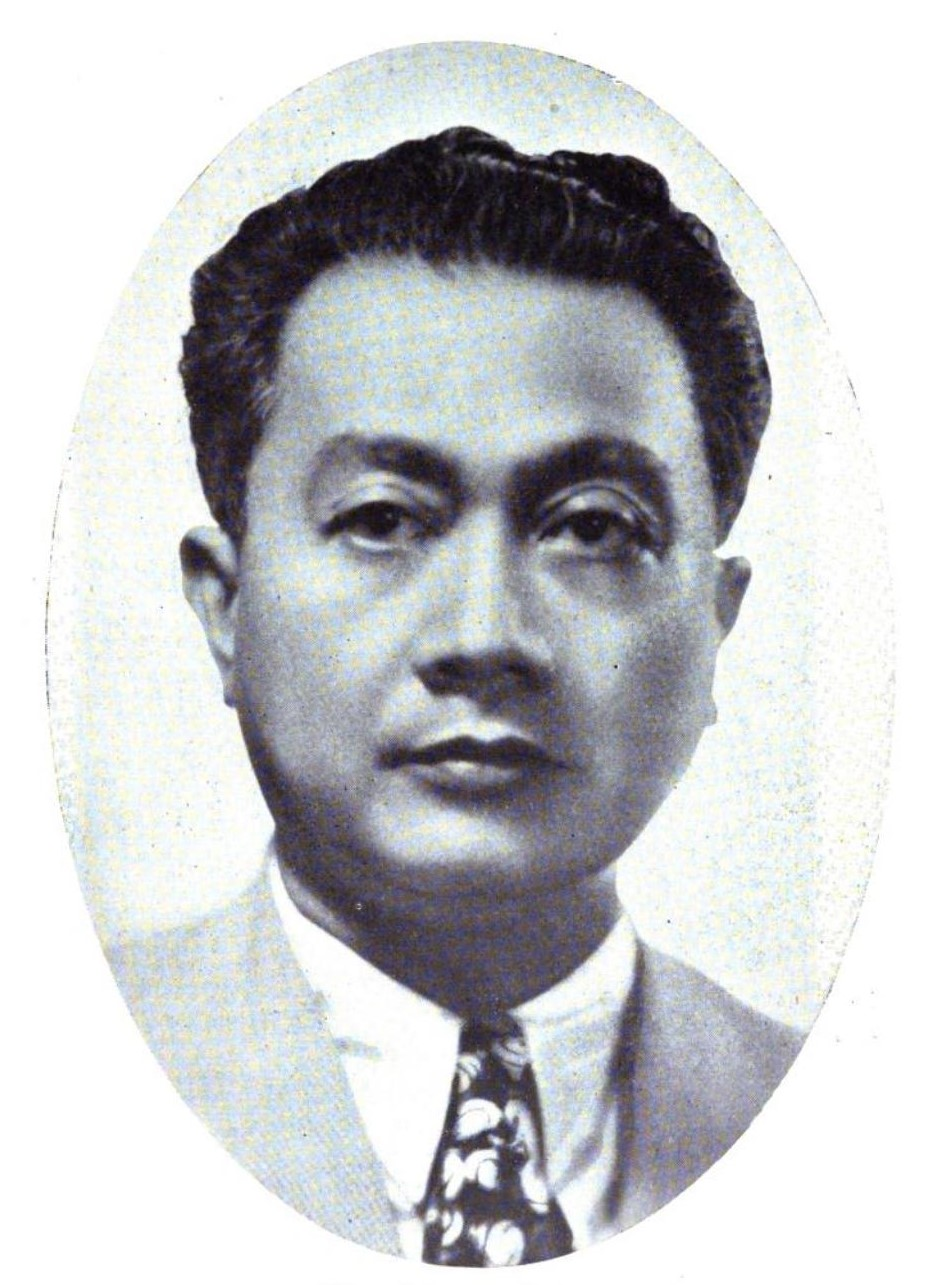

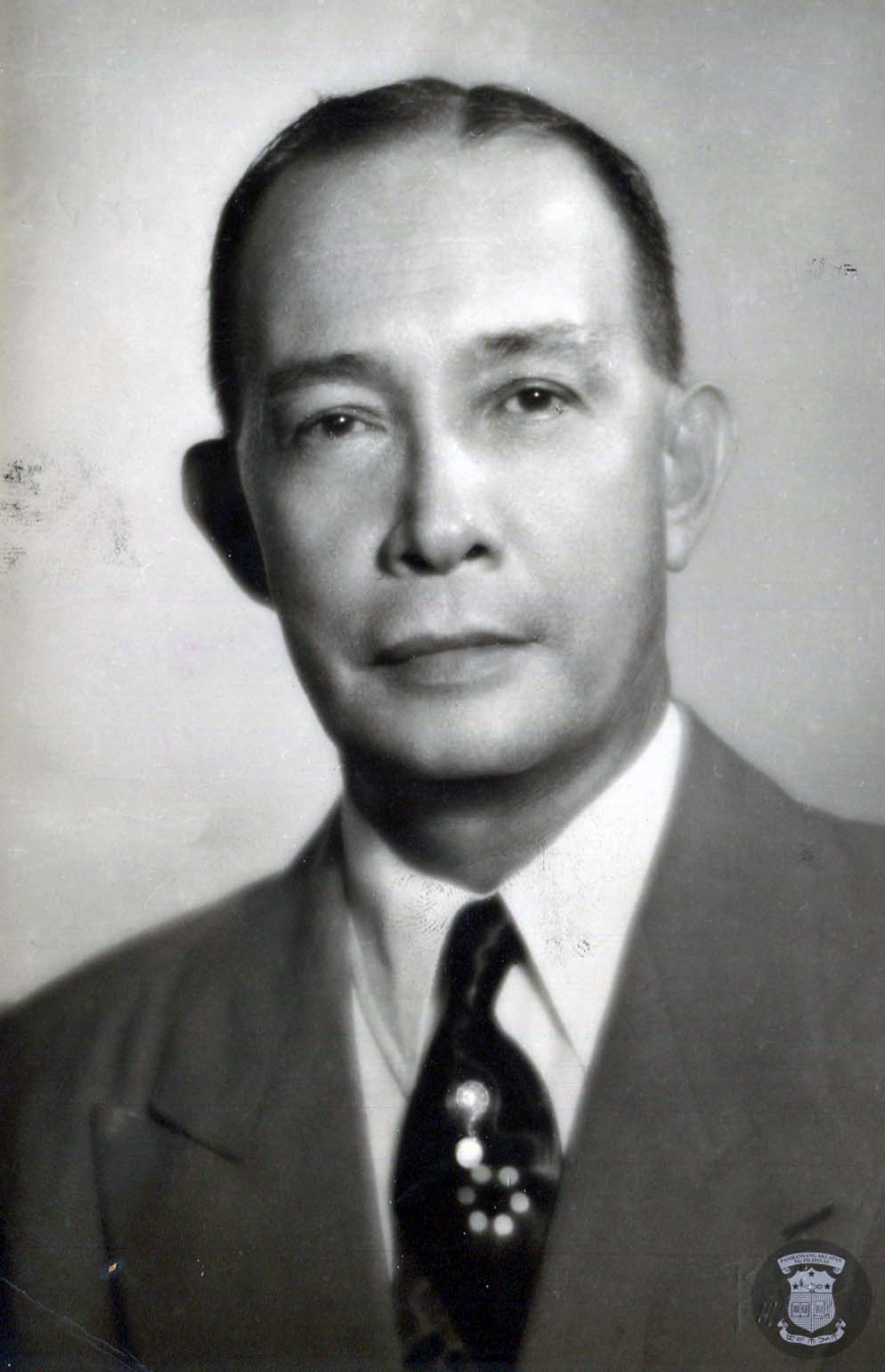

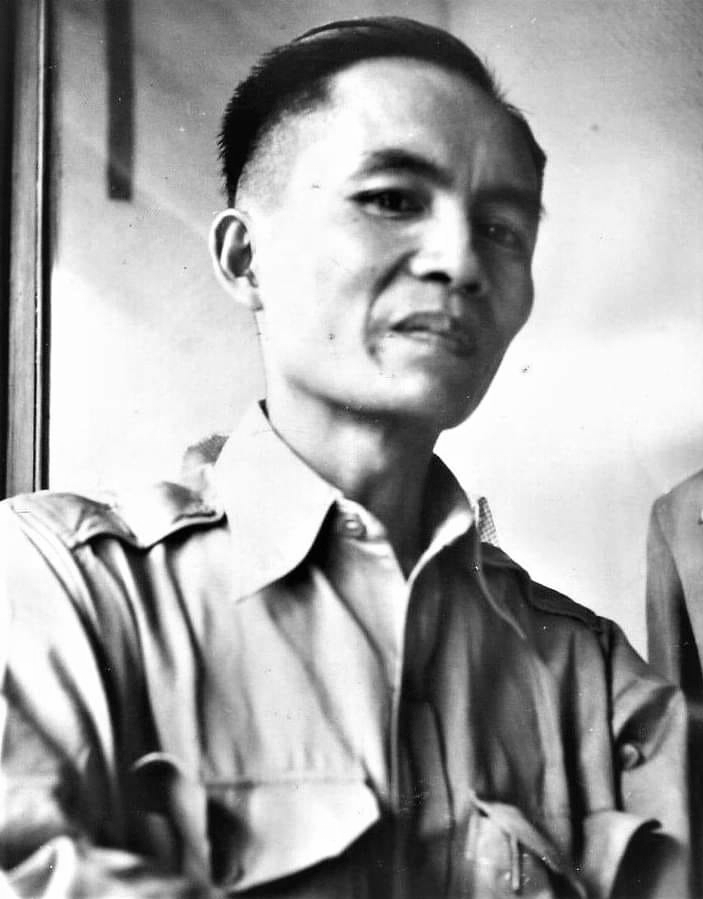
	First party	Second party	Third party
Leader	Eugenio Pérez	Cipriano Primicias Sr.	Luis Taruc
Party	Liberal	Nacionalista	Democratic Alliance
Leader's seat	Pangasinan–2nd	Pangasinan–4th	Pampanga–2nd
Seats won	49	35	6
Popular vote	908,740	1,069,971	152,410
Percentage	38.89	45.78	6.52
Speaker before election
José Zulueta
Nacionalista
Elected Speaker
Eugenio Pérez
Liberal

Elections for the president, vice-president, members of the Senate, members of the House of Representatives and local positions were held on April 23, 1946, pursuant to Commonwealth Act No. 725.

== Background ==
Soon after the reconstitution of the Commonwealth government in 1945, Senators Manuel Roxas, Elpidio Quirino and their allies called for an early national election to choose the president and vice president of the Philippines and members of the Congress. In December 1945, the House Insular Affairs Committee of the United States Congress approved the joint resolution setting the date of the election on not later than April 30, 1946.

Prompted by this congressional action, President Sergio Osmeña called the Philippine Congress to a three-day special session. Congress enacted Commonwealth Act No. 725, setting the date of the election on April 23, 1946. The act was signed by Osmeña on January 5, 1946.

== Candidates ==
Three parties presented their respective candidates for the different national elective positions. These were the Nacionalista Party – Conservative (Osmeña) Wing, the Liberal Wing of the Nacionalista Party, and the Partido Modernista. The Nacionalistas had Osmeña and Senator Eulogio Rodriguez as their candidates for president and vice president, respectively. The Modernistas chose Hilario Moncado and Luis Salvador for the same positions. The standard bearers of the Liberals were senators Manuel Roxas and Elpidio Quirino.

On January 3, 1946, President Osmeña announced his candidacy for the presidency. On January 22, Eulogio Rodriguez was nominated as Osmeña's running mate for vice president, in a convention held at Ciro's Club in Manila. According to the Manila Chronicle:

The convention opened at 10:15 in the morning when the acting secretary of the party, Vicente Farmoso, called the confab to order.

Congressman Jose C. Romero, who delivered the keynote speech accused Senate President Manuel Roxas and his followers of fanning the flames of discontent among the people, of capitalizing on the people's hardship, and of minimizing the accomplishment of the [Osmeña] Administration. These men with the Messiah complex have been the bane of the country and of the world. This is the mentality that produces Hitlers and the Mussolinis, and their desire to climb to power. they even want to destroy the party which placed them where they are today.

Senator Carlos P. Garcia, who delivered the nomination speech for President Sergio Osmeña, made a long recital of Osmeña's achievements, his virtues as public official and as private citizen.

Entering the convention hall at about 7:30 p.m, President Osmeña, accompanied by the committee on notification, was greeted with rounds of cheer and applause as he ascended the platform. President Osmeña delivered his speech which was a general outline of his future plans once elected. He emphasized that as far as his party is concerned, independence is a close issue. It is definitely coming on July 4, 1946

On January 19, 1946, Senator Roxas announced his candidacy for the presidency in a convention held in Santa Ana Cabaret in Makati, Rizal. According to Manila Chronicle:

...more than three thousand (by conservative estimate there were only 1,000 plus) delegates, party members and hero worshipers jammed into suburban, well known Santa Ana Cabaret (biggest in the world) to acclaim ex-katipunero and Bagong Katipunan organizer Manuel Acuña Roxas as the guidon bearer of the Nacionalista Party's Liberal Wing.

The delegates, who came from all over the Islands, met in formal convention from 10:50 am and did not break up till about 5:30 pm.

They elected 1. Mariano J. Cuenco, professional Osmeñaphobe, as temporary chairman; 2. Jose Avelino and ex-pharmacist Antonio Zacarias permanent chairman and secretary, respectively; 3. nominated forty-four candidates for senators; 4. heard the generalissimo himself deliver an oratorical masterpiece consisting of 50 per cent attacks against the (Osmeña) Administration, 50 per cent promises, pledges. Rabid Roxasites greeted the Roxas acceptance speech with hysterical applause.

President Osmeña tried to prevent the split in the Nacionalista Party by offering Senator Roxas the position of Philippine Regent Commissioner to the United States but the latter turned down the offer.

As a result of the split among the members of the Nacionalista Party, owing to marked differenced of opinion on certain vital issues of which no settlement had been reached, a new political organization was born and named the Liberal Wing of the Nacionalista Party, which would later become the Liberal Party.

== Results ==
The election was generally peaceful and orderly except in some places where passions ran high, especially in the province of Pampanga. According to the controversial decision of the Electoral Tribunal of the House of Representatives on Meliton Soliman vs. Luis Taruc, Pampanga was under the terroristic clutches and control of the Hukbalahaps.So terrorized were the people of Arayat, at one time, 200 persons abandoned their homes, their work, and their food, all their belongings in a mass evacuation to the poblacion due to fear and terror.

A total of 2,218,847 voters went to the polls to elect their president and vice president, who were also to be the commonwealth's last and the republic's first.

Four days after election day, the Liberal candidates were proclaimed victors. Roxas registered an overwhelming majority of votes in 34 provinces and nine cities: Abra, Agusan, Albay, Antique, Bataan, Batanes, Batangas, Bukidnon, Bulacan, Cagayan, Camarines Norte, Camarines Sur, Capiz, Cavite, Cotabato, Ilocos Norte, Ilocos Sur, Isabela, Laguna, La Union, Leyte, Marinduque, Mindoro, Misamis Oriental, Negros Occidental, Nueva Vizcaya, Palawan, Pangasinan, Rizal, Romblon, Samar, Sorsogon, Sulu, Surigao, Tayabas, Zambales, Manila, Quezon City, Bacolod (Negros Occidental), Iloilo City (Iloilo), Baguio (Mountain Province), Zamboanga City (Zamboanga), Tagaytay (Cavite), Cavite City (Cavite) and San Pablo City (Laguna)

Likewise, the Liberals won nine out of 16 contested senatorial seats.

In the House of Representatives, the Liberals won an overwhelming majority with 50 seats while the Nacionalistas and the Democratic Alliance only got 33 and six seats, respectively.

=== President ===
Candidate	Party	Votes	%
Manuel Roxas	Nacionalista Party (Liberal wing) (Note: The Nacionalista Party was split into two wings: those who supported Osmeña or the "conservative wing", and those who supported Roxas or the "liberal wing". The liberal wing eventually split off after the election and became the Liberal Party.)	1,333,006	53.93
Sergio Osmeña	Nacionalista Party	1,129,994	45.72
Hilario Moncado	Modernist Party	8,538	0.35
Total		2,471,538	100.00
Valid votes		2,471,538	95.17
Invalid/blank votes		125,342	4.83
Total votes		2,596,880	100.00
Registered voters/turnout		2,898,604	89.59
Source: Nohlen, Grotz, Hartmann, Hasall and Santos

=== Vice-president ===
Candidate	Party	Votes	%
Elpidio Quirino	Nacionalista Party (Liberal wing) (Note: The Nacionalista Party was split into two wings: those who supported Osmeña or the "conservative wing", and those who supported Roxas or the "liberal wing". The liberal wing eventually split off after the election and became the Liberal Party.)	1,161,725	52.36
Eulogio Rodriguez	Nacionalista Party	1,051,243	47.38
Lou Salvador	Modernist Party	5,879	0.26
Total		2,218,847	100.00
Valid votes		2,218,847	85.44
Invalid/blank votes		378,033	14.56
Total votes		2,596,880	100.00
Registered voters/turnout		2,898,604	89.59
Source: Nohlen, Grotz, Hartmann, Hasall and Santos

==== Senate ====
Representation of results; seats contested are inside the box. Nacionalista Party Liberal Party Popular Front

The first eight senators would serve until 1951, and the second eight until 1949:

Candidate	Party	Votes	%
Vicente Francisco	Nacionalista Party (Liberal wing) (Note: The Nacionalista Party was split into two wings: those who supported Sergio Osmeña in the presidential election or the "conservative wing", and those who supported Manuel Roxas or the "liberal wing". The liberal wing eventually split off after the election and became the Liberal Party.)	735,671	28.63
Vicente Sotto	Popular Front	717,225	27.91
José Avelino	Nacionalista Party (Liberal wing)	708,420	27.57
Melecio Arranz	Nacionalista Party (Liberal wing)	666,700	25.94
Ramon Torres	Nacionalista Party (Liberal wing)	640,477	24.92
Tomás Confesor	Nacionalista Party	627,354	24.41
Mariano Jesús Cuenco	Nacionalista Party (Liberal wing)	623,650	24.27
Carlos P. Garcia	Nacionalista Party	617,542	24.03
Olegario Clarin	Nacionalista Party (Liberal wing)	611,227	23.78
Alejo Mabanag	Nacionalista Party	608,902	23.69
Enrique Magalona	Nacionalista Party (Liberal wing)	591,796	23.03
Tomas Cabili	Nacionalista Party	589,762	22.95
José O. Vera	Nacionalista Party	588,993	22.92
Ramón Diokno	Nacionalista Party	584,598	22.75
José E. Romero (Note: José E. Romero was later removed from office in favor of Prospero Sanidad who won an election protest.)	Nacionalista Party	563,816	21.94
Salipada Pendatun	Nacionalista Party (Liberal wing)	557,156	21.68
Prospero Sanidad	Nacionalista Party (Liberal wing)	556,772	21.67
Vicente dela Cruz	Nacionalista Party (Liberal wing)	544,621	21.19
Servillano dela Cruz	Nacionalista Party (Liberal wing)	536,995	20.90
Pedro Magsalin	Nacionalista Party (Liberal wing)	516,127	20.08
Antonio Paguia	Laborite Party	505,770	19.68
Santiago Fonacier	Nacionalista Party	499,565	19.44
Antonio Araneta	Nacionalista Party	491,054	19.11
Emilio M. Javier	Popular Front	481,913	18.75
Eduardo Cojuangco Sr.	Nacionalista Party (Liberal wing)	481,683	18.74
Pedro S. Reyes	Nacionalista Party	465,987	18.13
Jose Altavas	Nacionalista Party	461,014	17.94
Rafael Martinez	Nacionalista Party	449,534	17.49
Vicente Lava	Nacionalista Party (Liberal wing)	431,842	16.80
Mariano Garchitorena	Nacionalista Party (Liberal wing)	423,828	16.49
Pedro Insua	Nacionalista Party	403,561	15.70
Pascual Azanza	Nacionalista Party	397,835	15.48
Carlos Padilla Sr.	Modernist Party	75,066	2.92
Dionesio Gutierrez	Nacionalista Party	49,037	1.91
Francisco Zandueta	Nacionalista Party (independent)	47,802	1.86
Ramon Lopez	Democratic Alliance	44,718	1.74
Vicente Ocampo	Modernist Party	43,872	1.71
Jose C. Soto	Modernist Party	35,408	1.38
Asa-ad Usman	Nacionalista Party	28,924	1.13
Timoteo Consing	Nacionalista Party	27,597	1.07
Emilia T. del Rosario	Modernist Party	25,586	1.00
Manuel Silos	Modernist Party	23,344	0.91
Miguel Anzures	Modernist Party	20,441	0.80
Jose Climaco	Modernist Party	20,231	0.79
Ismael Golez	National Welfare Service Party	17,069	0.66
Dominador Santiago	Modernist Party	16,553	0.64
Casiano Rosales	Modernist Party	14,949	0.58
Carlos V. Tolosa	Modernist Party	13,527	0.53
Paul Versoza	National Welfare Service Party	12,094	0.47
Godofredo Calub	Modernist Party	11,498	0.45
Jesus Infante	Modernist Party	10,487	0.41
Melchor Lagasca	National Welfare Service Party	10,323	0.40
Felix E. Rey	Modernist Party	9,787	0.38
Rosendo Zaldarriaga	Democratic (Osmeña)	9,656	0.38
Pasto Lavadia	Nacionalista Party (Liberal wing)	7,864	0.31
Constancio P. Cecilio	Modernist Party	7,807	0.30
Marcelino Josue	Modernist Party	4,604	0.18
Total		18,269,634	100.00
Total votes		2,569,880	–
Registered voters/turnout		2,898,604	88.66

=== House of Representatives ===
Party	Votes	%	Seats	+/–
Nacionalista Party (Note: The Nacionalista Party was split into two wings: those who supported Sergio Osmeña in the presidential election or the "conservative wing", and those who supported Manuel Roxas or the "liberal wing". The liberal wing eventually split off after the election and became the Liberal Party.)	1,069,971	45.78	35	−60
Nacionalista Party (Liberal wing)	908,740	38.89	49	New
Democratic Alliance	152,410	6.52	6	New
Popular Front	62,286	2.67	1	New
Young Philippines	31,222	1.34	1	New
Popular Democratic Party	20,089	0.86	1	New
Laborite Party	3,324	0.14	0	0
Modernist Party	570	0.02	0	0
Republican Party	516	0.02	0	0
Philippine Masses Party	56	0.00	0	0
Independent	87,770	3.76	5	+2
Total	2,336,954	100.00	98	0
Valid votes	2,336,954	90.94		
Invalid/blank votes	232,926	9.06		
Total votes	2,569,880	100.00		
Registered voters/turnout	2,898,604	88.66		
Source: Nohlen, Grotz and Hartmann and Teehankee

== See also ==
- Commission on Elections
- Politics of the Philippines
- Philippine elections
- President of the Philippines
- 1st Congress of the Philippines
