= First Great Rectification Movement =

The First Great Rectification Movement refers to a 1965 ideological movement by Filipino communists led by Jose Maria Sison wherein they "criticized, repudiated and rectified the major ideological, political and organizational errors and weaknesses" of the 1930s-era Communist Party of the Philippines. This rectification movement led to the reestablishment of the Communist Party of the Philippines on December 26, 1968, along Marxist–Leninist–Maoist Thought.

== Background ==
The Communist Party of the Philippines (Partido Komunista ng Pilipinas – PKP) was established on November 7, 1930, guided by Marxist–Leninist Thought. During World War II, the Hukbalahap under Luis Taruc and Vicente Lava was organized under PKP leadership with the aim of resisting the Japanese occupation of the Philippines. After the Second World War ended, the PKP found itself in a considerably strengthened position in the working class and peasant movements.

In 1948, the PKP began an armed struggle against the Philippine government, turning the Hukbalahap into a People's Liberation Army. However, in 1950, the entire secretariat of the Central Committee of the PKP was arrested, including General Secretary Jose Lava, following the earlier capture of the Politburo in Manila. In the course of the armed struggle, the PKP and the People's Liberation Army sustained heavy losses. By the end of 1954, the armed struggle was effectively over. The PKP then pursued a course of peaceful action.

== Split from the Partido Komunista ng Pilipinas ==
Jose Maria Sison was a graduate student and teacher at the University of the Philippines Diliman when he joined the Partido Komunista ng Pilipinas in 1962 upon the invitation of Jesus Lava. In due course, he joined a five-man committee tasked with reviving the party and organizing a youth movement. Using the nom de guerre "Amado Guerrero", Sison co-founded the Kabataang Makabayan ("Patriotic Youth") with Nilo Tayag in 1964. This organization rallied the Filipino youth against the Vietnam War, the Marcos presidency and corrupt politicians. It was involved in the period of civil unrest during the 1970s called the First Quarter Storm.

Influenced by the Chinese Cultural Revolution in 1966, Sison created a youth-based Maoist group within the PKP. The Lavas however, became discomfited by Sison's growing popularity within the PKP. When Sison wrote a draft of the party's history, they pressured him to shelve the document for future discussion when it turned out to be a "powerful indictment of the Lavas' history of incompetence since World War II." Sison's aim to continue the armed struggle clashed with the party leaders' view that armed struggle was an exercise in futility. Consequently, Sison and his group were expelled from the PKP in 1967.

On December 26, 1968, Sison and ten of his companions met in Alaminos, Pangasinan and formed the Central Committee of the Communist Party of the Philippines (CPP) founded on Marxist–Leninist–Maoist Thought. The revised historical report on the PKP now had a new title, "Rectify Errors and Rebuild the Party"; it was adopted as a founding document. This came to be known as the "First Great Rectification Movement". The reformed Communist Party included Maoism within the political ideology as well as a two-stage revolution consisting of a protracted people's war to be followed by a Socialist revolution. The PKP leadership sought to eliminate and marginalize Sison. However, over time, Sison's bloc became the leading communist party in the Philippines.

== See also ==
- Second Great Rectification Movement
- Yan'an Rectification Movement
