= 1st Congress of the Philippines =

18th legislative term of the Philippines

←	1st Commonwealth Congress	2nd	→
- Old Legislative Building (c. 1988)

Overview
- Term: May 25, 1946 – December 13, 1949
- President: Manuel Roxas (until April 15, 1948); Elpidio Quirino (from April 17, 1948)
- Vice President: Elpidio Quirino (until April 17, 1948)

Senate
- Members: 24
- President: Jose Avelino (until February 21, 1949); Mariano Jesus Cuenco (from February 21, 1949)
- President pro tempore: Melecio Arranz
- Majority leader: Vicente Francisco (until February 21, 1949); Tomas Cabili (from February 21, 1949)
- Minority leader: Carlos P. Garcia

House of Representatives
- Members: 98
- Speaker: Eugenio Perez
- Speaker pro tempore: Francisco Ortega
- Majority leader: Raul Leuterio
- Minority leader: Cipriano Primicias Sr.

The 1st Congress of the Philippines (Filipino: Unang Kongreso ng Pilipinas), composed of the Philippine Senate and House of Representatives, met from May 25, 1946, until December 13, 1949, during the 22-month presidency of Manuel Roxas and the first two years of Elpidio Quirino's presidency. The body was originally convened as the 2nd Congress of the Commonwealth of the Philippines. On August 5, 1946, Republic Act No. 6 was approved, renaming the body as the 1st Congress of the Philippines.

== Sessions ==
=== 2nd Congress of the Commonwealth of the Philippines ===
- Regular Session: May 25 – July 4, 1946

=== 1st Congress of the Philippines ===
- First Regular Session: July 5 – September 18, 1946
- First Special Session: September 25–30, 1946
- Second Regular Session: January 27 – May 22, 1947
- Third Regular Session: January 26 – May 20, 1948
- Second Special Session: June 14–26, 1948
- Fourth Regular Session: January 24 – May 19, 1949
- Special Joint Session: December 13, 1949

== Legislation ==
The Second Commonwealth Congress passed a total of 12 laws: Commonwealth Acts No. 721 to 733.
The First Congress of the Philippines passed a total of 421 laws: Republic Acts No. 1 to 421.

== Leadership ==
=== Senate ===
Senate President

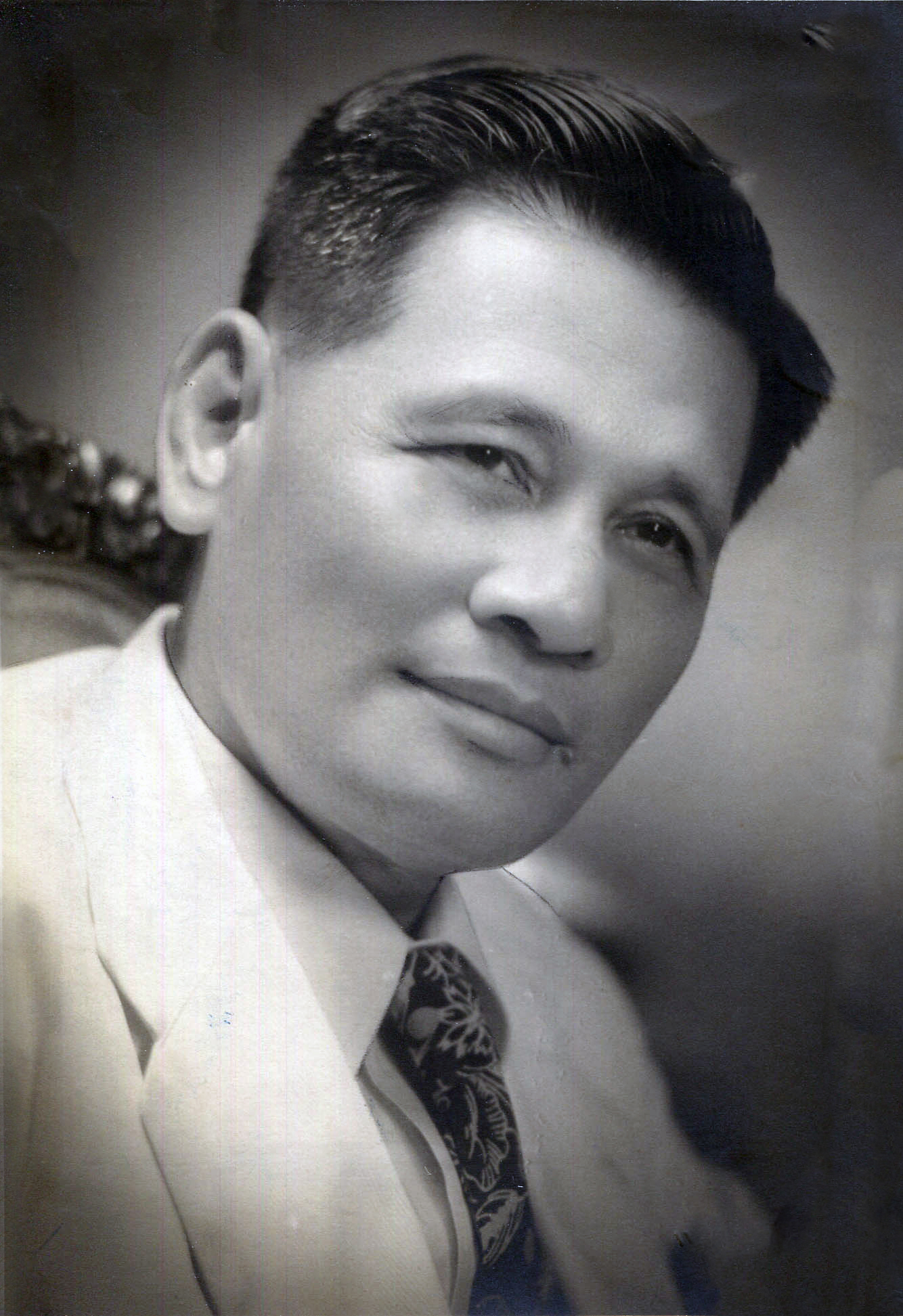
José Avelino,
until February 21, 1949

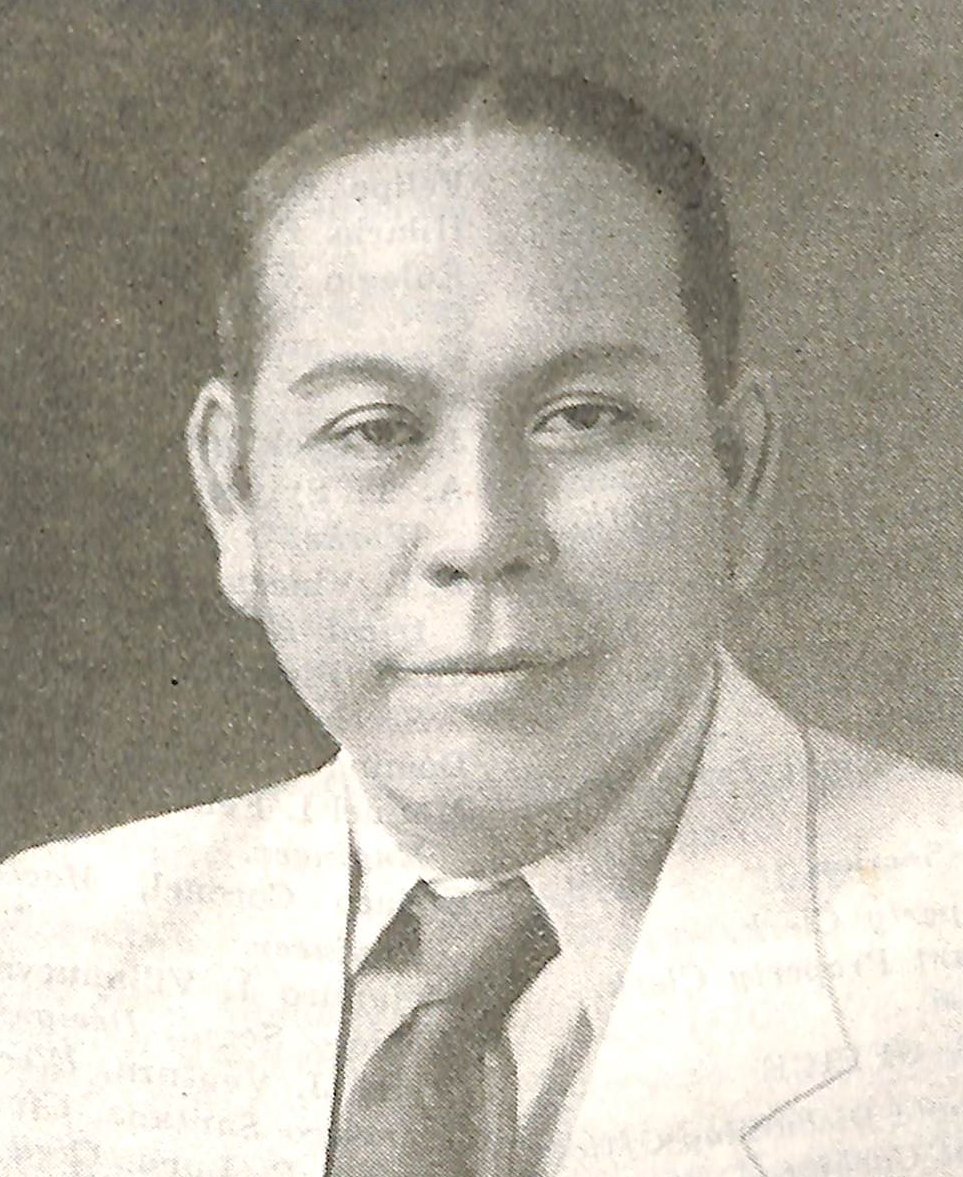
Mariano Jesús Cuenco,
from February 21, 1949

- President:
  - Jose Avelino (Liberal), until February 21, 1949
  - Mariano Jesus Cuenco (Liberal), from February 21, 1949
- President pro tempore: Melecio Arranz (Liberal)
- Majority Floor Leader:
  - Vicente Francisco (Liberal), until February 21, 1949
  - Tomas Cabili (Liberal), from February 21, 1949
- Minority Floor Leader: Carlos P. Garcia (Nacionalista)

=== House of Representatives ===
House Speaker

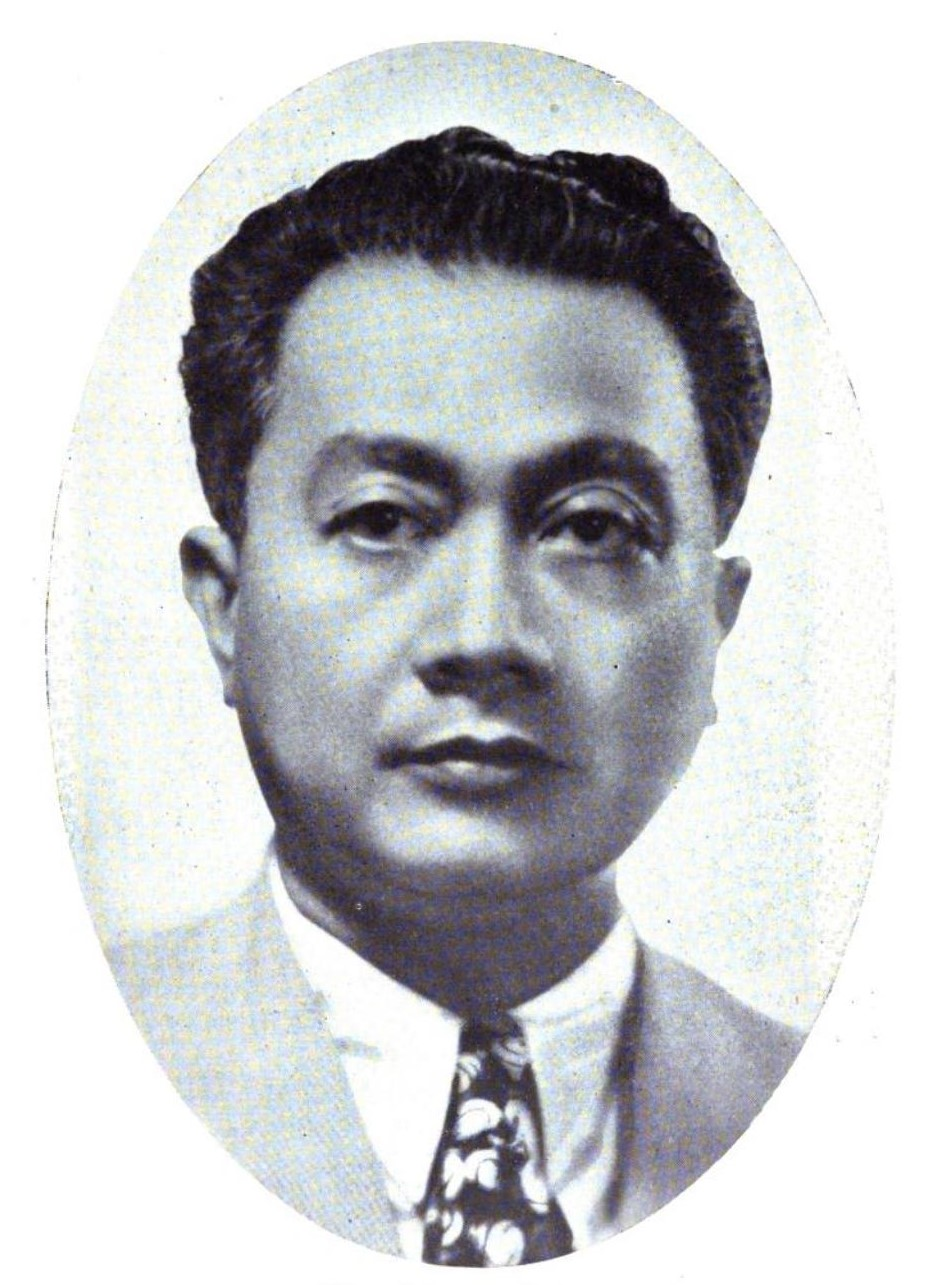
Eugenio Pérez

- Speaker: Eugenio Perez (Pangasinan–2nd, Liberal)
- Speaker pro-tempore: Francisco Ortega (La Union–1st, Liberal)
- Majority Floor Leader: Raul Leuterio (Mindoro, Liberal)
- Minority Floor Leader: Cipriano Primicias Sr. (Pangasinan–4th, Nacionalista)

== Members ==
=== Senate ===
The following are the terms of the senators of this Congress, according to the date of election:

- For senators elected on November 11, 1941: July 9, 1945 – December 30, 1947
- For the first eight senators elected on April 23, 1946: May 25, 1946 – December 30, 1951
- For the other eight senators elected on April 23, 1946: May 25, 1946 – December 30, 1949
- For senators elected on November 11, 1947: December 30, 1947 – December 30, 1953.

Senator	Party	Term end
Alauya Alonto	Nacionalista	1947
Pablo Angeles David	Liberal	1953
Melecio Arranz	Liberal	1951
Jose Avelino	Liberal	1951
Tomas Cabili	Nacionalista	1949
Olegario Clarin	Liberal	1949
Tomas V. Confesor	Liberal	1951
Mariano Jesus Cuenco	Liberal	1951
Esteban de la Rama (Note: Esteban de la Rama died on November 30, 1947.)	Nacionalista	1947
Ramon Diokno	Nacionalista	1949
Vicente Francisco	Liberal	1951
Carlos P. Garcia	Nacionalista	1951
Pedro Hernaez	Nacionalista	1947
Fernando Lopez (Note: Fernando Lopez resigned on December 30, 1949, upon taking office as Vice President of the Philippines.)	Liberal	1953
Alejo Mabanag	Nacionalista	1949
Vicente Madrigal	Liberal	1947, 1953
Enrique Magalona	Liberal	1949
Camilo Osias	Liberal	1953
Geronima Pecson	Liberal	1953
Salipada Pendatun	Liberal	1949
Vicente Rama	Nacionalista	1947
Eulogio Rodriguez (Note: Eulogio Rodriguez initially lost reelection in 1947. He later took office on December 27, 1949, after winning an electoral protest against Carlos Tan.)	Nacionalista	1947, 1953
Jose E. Romero (Note: Jose E. Romero was removed by the Senate Electoral Tribunal on May 8, 1947, after an electoral protest.)	Nacionalista	1949
Prospero Sanidad (Note: Prospero Sanidad took office on May 22, 1947, after winning an electoral protest against Jose E. Romero.)	Liberal	1949
Proceso Sebastian	Nacionalista	1947
Vicente Sotto	Popular Front	1951
Carlos Tan (Note: Carlos Tan was removed by the Senate Electoral Tribunal on December 16, 1949, after an electoral protest.)	Liberal	1953
Lorenzo Tañada	Liberal	1953
Emiliano Tria Tirona	Liberal (Note: Affiliated with the Nacionalista Party until 1947.)	1947, 1953
Ramon Torres	Liberal	1951
Jose O. Vera	Nacionalista	1949

=== House of Representatives ===
House seats by province in the 1st Congress.

Province/City	District	Representative	Party
Abra	Lone	Quintin Paredes	Liberal
Agusan	Lone	Marcos M. Calo	Liberal
Albay	1st	Eulogio V. Lawenko	Nacionalista
Albay	2nd	Toribio Perez	Liberal
Albay	3rd	Marcial O. Rañola	Nacionalista
Antique	Lone	Emigdio Nietes	Nacionalista
Bataan	Lone	Bonifacio Camacho	Popular Front
Batanes	Lone	Anastacio Agan	Nacionalista
Batangas	1st	Felixberto M. Serrano	Nacionalista
Batangas	2nd	Pedro P. Muñoz	Nacionalista
Batangas	3rd	Jose Laurel Jr.	Nacionalista
Bohol	1st	Luis T. Clarin (Note: Luis T. Clarin was removed by the House of Representatives Electoral Tribunal on February 15, 1949, after an electoral protest.)	Liberal
Bohol	1st	Genaro Visarra (Note: Genaro Visarra took office on March 4, 1949, after winning an electoral protest against Luis T. Clarin.)	Nacionalista
Bohol	2nd	Simeon G. Toribio	Liberal
Bohol	3rd	Cosme P. Garcia	Nacionalista
Bukidnon	Lone	Remedios Ozamis Fortich	Liberal
Bulacan	1st	Jesus Lava (Note: Representative-elects from the Democratic Alliance were prevented from taking office due to electoral protests.)	Democratic Alliance
Bulacan	1st	Florante C. Roque (Note: Florante C. Roque won an electoral protest against Jesus Lava.)	Liberal
Bulacan	2nd	Alejo Santos	Nacionalista
Cagayan	1st	Conrado V. Singson	Nacionalista
Cagayan	2nd	Paulino A. Alonzo	Nacionalista
Camarines Norte	Lone	Esmeraldo Eco	Young Philippines
Camarines Sur	1st	Juan Q. Miranda	Liberal
Camarines Sur	2nd	Sebastian C. Moll Jr.	Liberal
Capiz	1st	Ramon A. Arnaldo	Liberal
Capiz	2nd	Cornelio Villareal	Liberal
Capiz	3rd	Jose M. Reyes	Liberal
Catanduanes	Lone	Francisco A. Perfecto	Nacionalista
Cavite	Lone	Justiniano Montano	Nacionalista
Cebu	1st	Jovenal Almendras	Nacionalista
Cebu	2nd	Vicente Logarta	Nacionalista
Cebu	3rd	Maximino Noel	Nacionalista
Cebu	4th	Agustin Kintanar	Nacionalista
Cebu	5th	Leandro Tojong	Liberal
Cebu	6th	Nicolas Rafols (Note: Nicolas Rafols died on May 2, 1947.)	Nacionalista
Cebu	6th	Manuel A. Zosa (Note: Manuel A. Zosa was elected on November 11, 1947, to succeed Nicolas Rafols.)	Nacionalista
Cebu	7th	Jose V. Rodriguez	Nacionalista
Cotabato	Lone	Gumbay Piang	Liberal
Davao	Lone	Apolinario Cabigon	Nacionalista
Ilocos Norte	1st	Damaso T. Samonte	Liberal
Ilocos Norte	2nd	Pedro A. Albano	Liberal
Ilocos Sur	1st	Floro Crisologo	Nacionalista
Ilocos Sur	2nd	Fidel Villanueva	Liberal
Iloilo	1st	Jose Zulueta (Note: Jose Zulueta was appointed as Secretary of the Interior on May 28, 1946.)	Liberal
Iloilo	1st	Mateo M. Nonato (Note: Mateo M. Nonato was elected on March 11, 1947, to succeed Jose Zulueta.)	Liberal
Iloilo	2nd	Oscar Ledesma	Nacionalista
Iloilo	3rd	Tiburcio Lutero	Liberal
Iloilo	4th	Mariano Peñaflorida (Note: Mariano Peñaflorida was elected as Governor of Iloilo on November 11, 1947.)	Nacionalista
Iloilo	4th	Gaudencio Dimaisip (Note: Gaudencio Dimaisip was elected on March 23, 1948, to succeed Mariano Peñaflorida.)	Nacionalista
Iloilo	5th	Juan Borra	Liberal
Isabela	Lone	Domingo Paguirigan	Liberal
La Union	1st	Francisco Ortega	Liberal
La Union	2nd	Manuel T. Cases	Liberal
Laguna	1st	Eduardo A. Barreto	Liberal
Laguna	2nd	Estanislao Fernandez	Liberal
Lanao	Lone	Manalao Mindalano	Nacionalista
Leyte	1st	Carlos Tan (Note: Carlos Tan took office as Senator of the Philippines on December 30, 1947.)	Liberal
Leyte	1st	Jose R. Martinez (Note: Jose R. Martinez was elected on March 23, 1948, to succeed Carlos Tan.)	Liberal
Leyte	2nd	Domingo Veloso	Liberal
Leyte	3rd	Francisco M. Pajao	Liberal
Leyte	4th	Juan R. Perez	Liberal
Leyte	5th	Atilano R. Cinco	Liberal
Manila	1st	Jose T. Nueno	Popular Front
Manila	2nd	Hermenegildo Atienza	Liberal
Marinduque	Lone	Timoteo P. Ricohermoso	Liberal
Masbate	Lone	Emilio B. Espinosa	Liberal
Mindoro	Lone	Raul Leuterio	Liberal
Misamis Occidental	Lone	Porfirio G. Villarin	Liberal
Misamis Oriental	Lone	Pedro S. Baculio	Liberal
Mountain Province	1st	George K. Tait	Nacionalista
Mountain Province	2nd	Jose B. Mencio	Liberal
Mountain Province	3rd	Gabriel Dunuan	Nacionalista
Negros Occidental	1st	Vicente F. Gustilo Sr.	Nacionalista
Negros Occidental	2nd	Carlos Hilado	Liberal
Negros Occidental	3rd	Elisio M. Limsiaco	Liberal
Negros Oriental	1st	Lorenzo Teves	Nacionalista
Negros Oriental	2nd	Enrique Medina	Liberal
Nueva Ecija	1st	Jose A. Cando	Democratic Alliance
Nueva Ecija	2nd	Constancio Padilla	Democratic Alliance
Nueva Vizcaya	Lone	Leon Cabarroguis	Liberal
Palawan	Lone	Sofronio Española	Liberal
Pampanga	1st	Amado Yuzon	Democratic Alliance
Pampanga	2nd	Luis Taruc (Note: Luis Taruc resigned on June 1, 1946, to resume the leadership of the Hukbalahap Rebellion.)	Democratic Alliance
Pangasinan	1st	Juan G. Rodriguez	Nacionalista
Pangasinan	2nd	Eugenio Perez	Liberal
Pangasinan	3rd	Pascual Beltran	Liberal
Pangasinan	4th	Cipriano Primicias Sr.	Nacionalista
Pangasinan	5th	Narciso Ramos (Note: Narciso Ramos was appointed as minister-counsellor to the United Nations on July 15, 1946.)	Liberal
Pangasinan	5th	Cipriano S. Allas (Note: Cipriano S. Allas was elected on March 17, 1947, to succeed Narciso Ramos.)	Liberal
Rizal	1st	Diaz Ignacio Santos	Liberal
Rizal	2nd	Lorenzo Sumulong	Popular Front
Romblon	Lone	Modesto Formilleza	Liberal
Samar	1st	Agripino Escareal	Liberal
Samar	2nd	Tito V. Tizon	Liberal
Samar	3rd	Adriano D. Lomuntad	Liberal
Sorsogon	1st	Pacifico F. Lim	Liberal
Sorsogon	2nd	Tomas Clemente	Liberal
Sulu	Lone	Ombra Amilbangsa	Liberal
Surigao	Lone	Ricardo Navarro	Nacionalista
Tarlac	1st	Jose Roy	Liberal
Tarlac	2nd	Alejandro Simpaoco	Democratic Alliance
Tayabas	1st	Fortunato Suarez	Liberal
Tayabas	2nd	Tomas Morato	Liberal
Zambales	Lone	Ramon Magsaysay	Liberal
Zamboanga	Lone	Juan S. Alano	Liberal

== See also ==
- Congress of the Philippines
- Senate of the Philippines
- House of Representatives of the Philippines
- 1946 Philippine general election
