= Vicente Lava =

Filipino chemist and communist leader

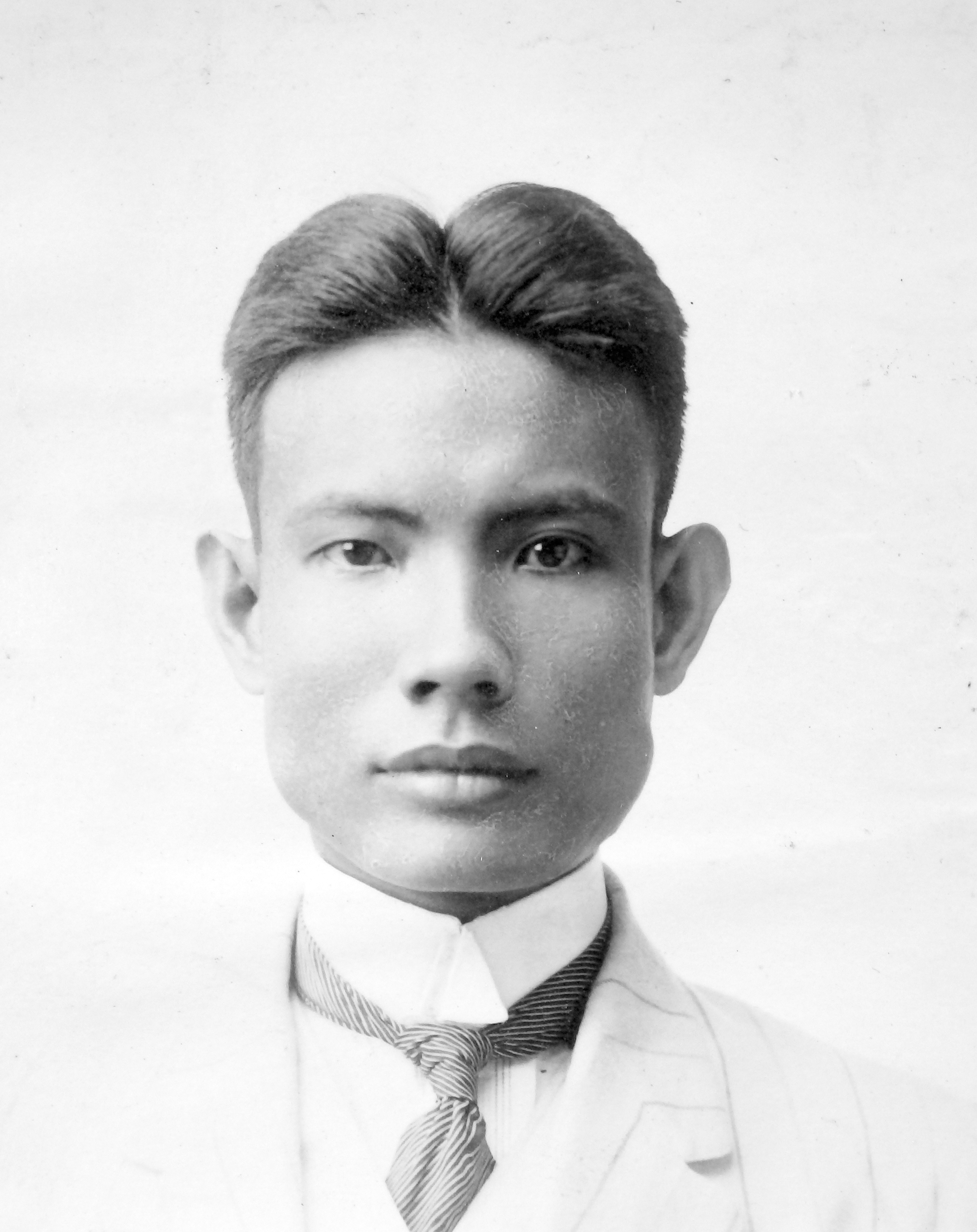
- Vicente Gregorio B. Lava Sr. - c. 1917

General Secretary of the Communist Party of the Philippines
- In office February 6, 1942 – September 1944
- Preceded by: Guillermo Capadocia
- Succeeded by: Triumvirate leadership (Note: Composed of Pedro Castro, Jorge Frianeza, and Primitivo Arrogante.)

Personal details
- Born: Vicente Gregorio Lava; December 24, 1894 Bulakan, Captaincy General of the Philippines, Spanish East Indies
- Died: September 16, 1947 (aged 52) Manila, Philippines
- Cause of death: Heart disease
- Resting place: La Loma Cemetery
- Party: Partido Komunista ng Pilipinas-1930 (from 1938)
- Other political affiliations: Democratic Alliance
- Spouse: Ruth Propper
- Children: 2
- Parents: Adeodato Lava; Maria Baltazar
- Relatives: Jose; Jesus
- Education: University of the Philippines; University of California, Berkeley; Columbia University (MS, PhD); New York University
- Occupation: Chemist; Scientist; Professor

Military service
- Allegiance: United States
- Branch/service: United States Army
- Years of service: 1918
- Unit: Chemical Warfare Service

Vicente Gregorio Baltazar Lava Sr. (December 24, 1894 – September 16, 1947) was a Filipino chemist who supported efforts toward economic independence for the Philippines and later became a leader in the communist resistance against the Japanese occupation of the Philippines.

== Early life and education ==
Vicente Gregorio Baltazar Lava Sr. was born on December 24, 1894, in Bulakan, Philippines, at the end of the Spanish colonial period. He was the eldest child of Adeodato and Maria (Baltazar) Lava. Four years after he was born, the Spanish were driven out of the Philippines, followed by the American suppression of an independence movement in 1901 and the beginning of American neocolonialism in the islands. From 1912 to 1916, Lava studied chemistry at the University of the Philippines.

Lava moved to the United States to pursue higher education in 1917, enrolling at the University of California, Berkeley. In 1918, he served for a brief stint in the US Army, where he was assigned to the Chemical Warfare Service. Lava later enrolled at Columbia University, where he earned his Master of Science and Doctor of Philosophy in Chemistry degrees in 1920 and 1923, respectively. While in New York, he met his wife, Ruth Propper.

He returned to the Philippines with Ruth in 1923, where he worked for two years as a chemist in the Bureau of Science. In 1925, Lava became a professor at the University of the Philippines Los Baños, where, in his interest in promoting local Philippine industry, which he believed was neglected as a result of the American Payne-Aldritch Tariff Act, he began research on a process of extracting oil and other fuels from coconuts. During this time, he and Ruth had two children: Frances (1924–2011) and Vicente "Buddy" Jr. (1926–2006).

In 1929, Lava returned to the United States, where he worked at Oberlin College in Ohio on a Grasselli research fellowship, conducting studies on Vitamin B. In 1931, he became a research fellow at New York University, where he resumed and completed his work on coconuts. It was during this period that he was first introduced to communist ideas.

== Pre-World War II ==
With his work on the coconut completed, Lava returned to the Philippines in 1934, where he worked as a consulting chemist at Consolidated Mines Inc. in Manila. During this period, he became a member of various academic societies, including the American Chemical Society, the National Research Council of the Philippines, and the American Association for the Advancement of Science.

In 1937, he again went to the United States to secure a patent for his coconut process. After successfully patenting it, he returned to the Philippines and set up a pilot plant in 1938. He also discovered other processes to create coconut milk and flour, and experimented with other native products. It was around this time that Lava joined the Communist Party of the Philippines.

The 1930s in the Philippines was a time when agricultural workers and laborers were starting to organize and strike against economic injustices. The Socialist Party, led by Luis Taruc and Pedro Abad Santos, was established in 1929, and the Communist Party, led by Crisanto Evangelista, was founded in 1930. The two parties merged into one Communist Party in 1938. According to Lava in an unpublished article submitted to Pacific Affairs entitled The Democratic Movement in the Philippines, "together, the merged parties [had] acquired considerable influence among the peasantry of central and southern Luzon and among the workers of Manila and other cities." After the merger, Lava organized the League For the Defense of Democracy, and was elected a member of the central committee.

== World War II ==
In December 1941, as the Japanese struck Pearl Harbor, a simultaneous strike occurred at Clark Air Base in the Philippines. That month, the Communist Party, with the help of Lava, prepared a 12-point memorandum urging national unity and resistance against the Japanese, and pledging loyalty to the Philippines and United States. In February 1942, the leaders of the Communist Party were arrested during the Japanese invasion of the Philippines, leaving Vicente Lava as the new general secretary. One month later, in March, the Hukbalahap, an anti-Japanese guerilla force was formed in central Luzon, with Lava as one of its designers.

A few months prior to the outbreak of the war, the Japanese offered Lava a sum of ₱1 million for his patented coconut process, but he refused to sell it, believing that it should only be used to advance Philippine industry. In July 1942, the Japanese raided the Lava family home in Bulakan in an attempt to obtain his coconut oil process, as the fuel created by this process could be used in the manufacture of explosives.

In 1943, the headquarters of the Hukbalahap in Luzon was raided, and Lava returned to Manila to reorganize the movement from a distance. His proposals were rejected and he was demoted in the party organization. In 1944, he worked on the organization of a new political party, the Democratic Alliance. Beginning in the same year, Lava's health deteriorated.

== Post-World War II ==
In 1946, Lava ran as a senatorial candidate of the Democratic Alliance but was not elected. Although Lava hoped to obtain equipment for his coconut process from the United States, he died of heart disease in Manila on September 16, 1947.
