= Congress of Labor Organizations =

Trade union federation in the Philippines

- Predecessor: Collective Labor Movement
- Founded: 1945
- Location: Philippines

The Congress of Labor Organizations (CLO) was a trade union federation in the Philippines. It was formed in 1945 by Hukbalahap guerillas who had been members of the Collective Labor Movement. Its first president was Cipriano Cid of the Philippine Trade Union Council. The CLO controlled labor unions in all major industries in Panay and Manila, representing a significant percentage of the organized labor force therein and was the dominant labor federation of the period immediately after World War II.

The CLO was part of the Democratic Alliance, a leftist political party led by the Partido Komunista ng Pilipinas. Its president during the mid-1960s was Amado V. Hernandez.

== See also ==
- Partido Obrero de Filipinas
