= 1946 Philippine House of Representatives elections =

8th Philippine House of Representatives elections

- April 23, 1946

All 98 seats in the House of Representatives of the Philippines 50 seats needed for a majority
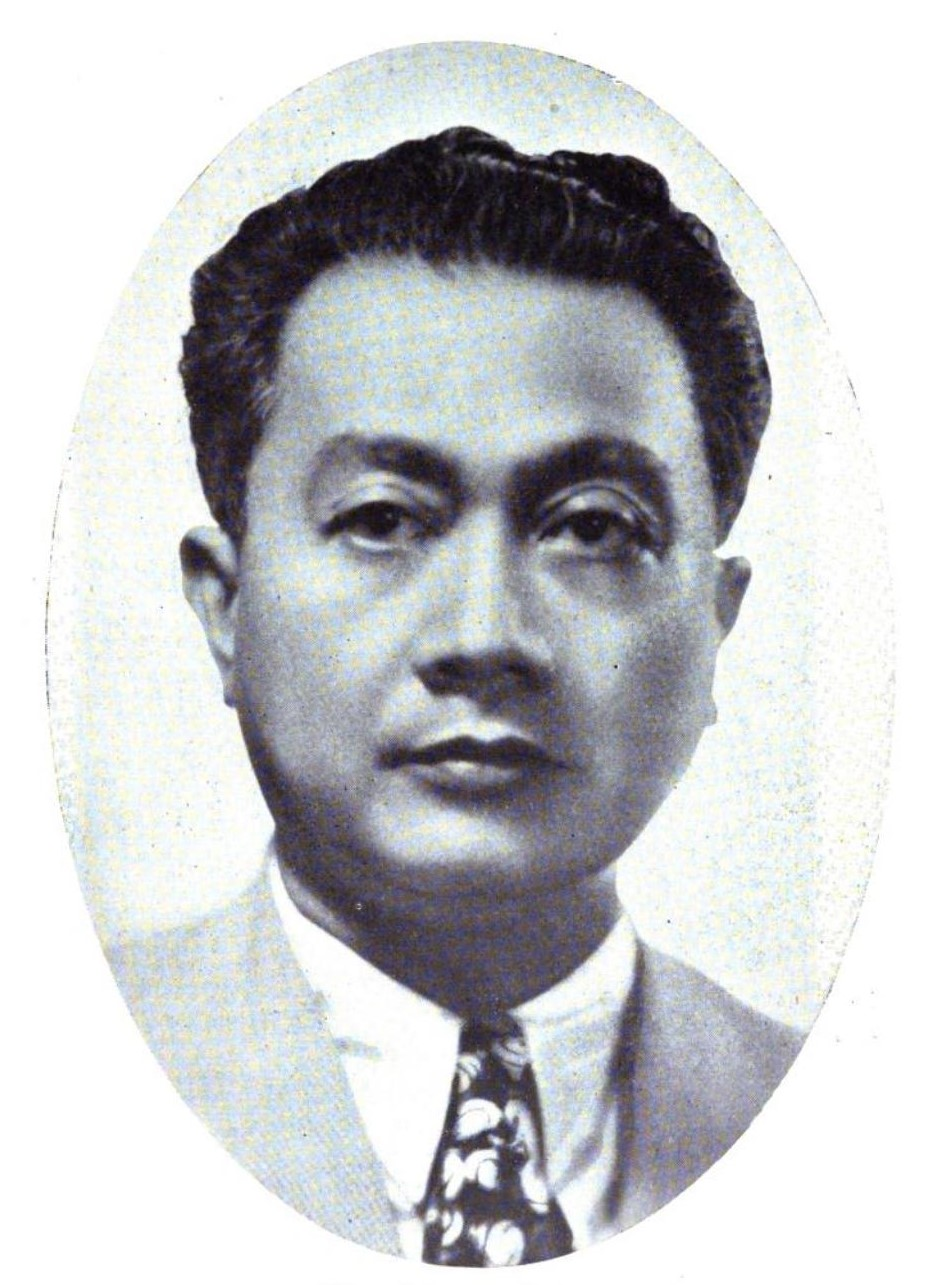

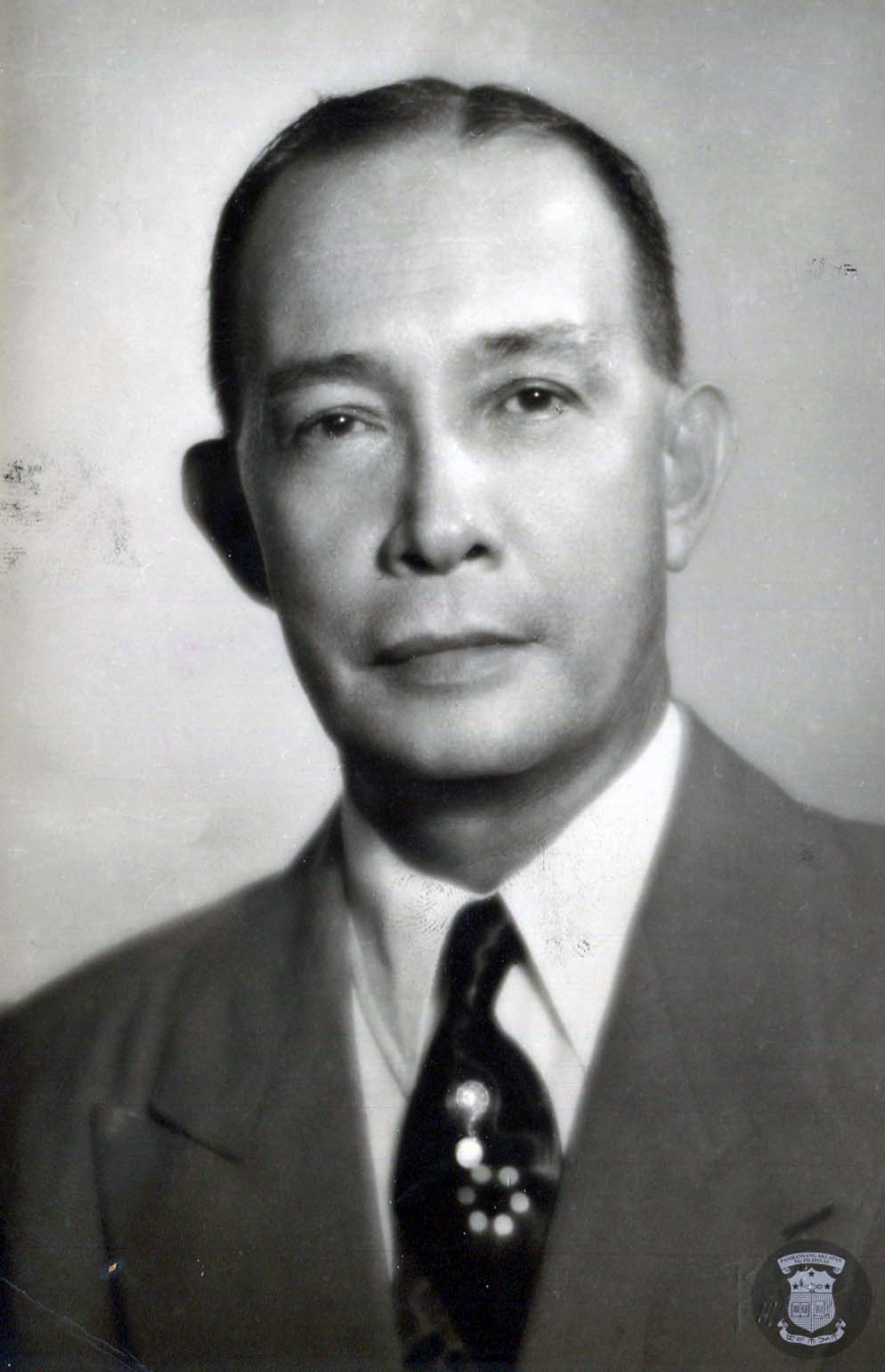

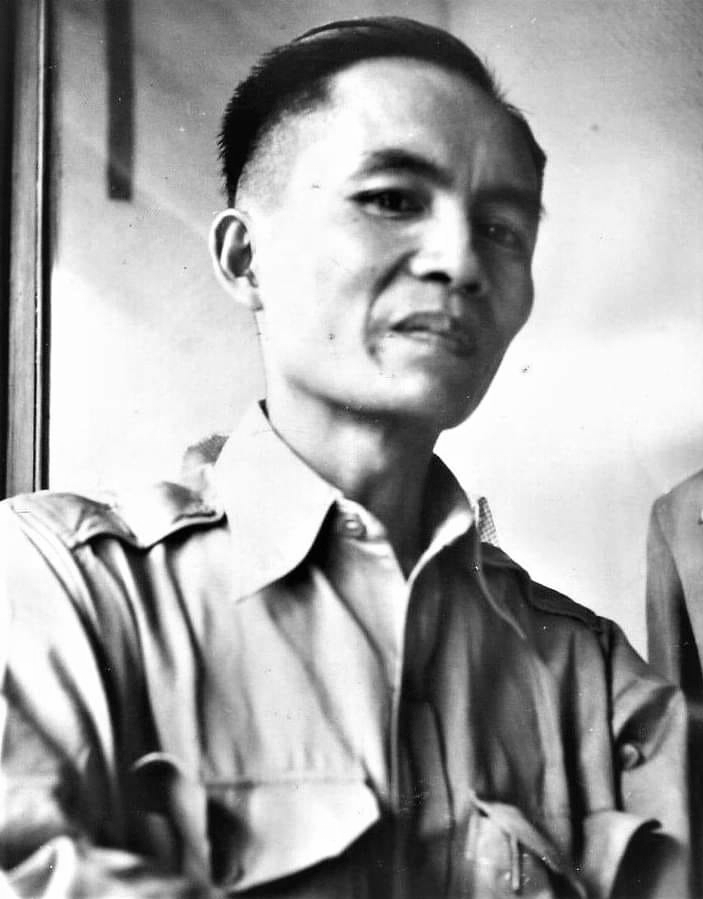
	First party	Second party	Third party
Leader	Eugenio Pérez	Cipriano Primicias Sr.	Luis Taruc
Party	Liberal	Nacionalista	Democratic Alliance
Leader's seat	Pangasinan–2nd	Pangasinan–4th	Pampanga–2nd
Seats won	49	35	6
Popular vote	908,740	1,069,971	152,410
Percentage	38.89	45.78	6.52
Speaker before election
José Zulueta
Nacionalista
Elected Speaker
Eugenio Pérez
Liberal

Elections for the House of Representatives of the Philippines were held on April 23, 1946. Held on the same day as the presidential election, it was held after the Nacionalista Party had split permanently into two factions: the "conservative" faction headed by president Sergio Osmeña and the "liberal" faction headed by Senate president Manuel Roxas, which later became the Liberal Party. Roxas and the Liberals won the elections, leaving the Nacionalistas with the minority in both houses of Congress.

Candidates from the leftist Democratic Alliance won six seats in the House of Representatives but were not allowed to take their seats on grounds of fraud and violent campaign tactics during the election. Five of them were later restored their seats but only after a constitution amendment concerning parity rights to U.S. citizens was approved. That approval was required by the Bell Trade Act of the United States Congress and led to the 1947 Philippine Parity Rights plebiscite to amend the 1935 Constitution of the Philippines.

== Electoral system ==
The House of Representatives has at most 120 seats, 98 seats for this election, all voted via first-past-the-post in single-member districts. Each province is guaranteed at least one congressional district, with more populous provinces divided into two or more districts.

Congress has the power of redistricting three years after each census.

== Results ==
Party	Votes	%	Seats	+/–
Nacionalista Party (Note: The Nacionalista Party was split into two wings: those who supported Sergio Osmeña in the presidential election or the "conservative wing", and those who supported Manuel Roxas or the "liberal wing". The liberal wing eventually split off after the election and became the Liberal Party.)	1,069,971	45.78	35	−60
Nacionalista Party (Liberal wing)	908,740	38.89	49	New
Democratic Alliance	152,410	6.52	6	New
Popular Front	62,286	2.67	1	New
Young Philippines	31,222	1.34	1	New
Popular Democratic Party	20,089	0.86	1	New
Laborite Party	3,324	0.14	0	0
Modernist Party	570	0.02	0	0
Republican Party	516	0.02	0	0
Philippine Masses Party	56	0.00	0	0
Independent	87,770	3.76	5	+2
Total	2,336,954	100.00	98	0
Valid votes	2,336,954	90.94		
Invalid/blank votes	232,926	9.06		
Total votes	2,569,880	100.00		
Registered voters/turnout	2,898,604	88.66		
Source: Nohlen, Grotz and Hartmann and Teehankee

Vote share
NP	45.78%
NP (LW)	38.89%
DA	6.52%
Others	8.81%

Seats
NP	35.71%
NP (LW)	50.00%
DA	6.12%
Others	8.16%

== See also ==
- 2nd Congress of the Commonwealth of the Philippines

== Bibliography ==
- Paras, Corazon L. (2000). The Presidents of the Senate of the Republic of the Philippines. ISBN 971-8832-24-6.
- Pobre, Cesar P. (2000). Philippine Legislature 100 Years. ISBN 971-92245-0-9.
