= Partido Komunista ng Pilipinas-1930 =

Communist party in the Philippines

- Abbreviation: PKP-1930
- General Secretary: Eduardo Landayan
- Founder: Crisanto Evangelista
- Founded: August 26, 1930; 96 years ago
- Legalized: 1937; 89 years ago July 25, 1987; 39 years ago
- Banned: October 26, 1932; 94 years ago June 20, 1957; 69 years ago
- Preceded by: Partido Obrero de Filipinas
- Headquarters: Manila
- Newspaper: Sulong!
- Youth wing: Samahan sa Ikauunlad ng Kabataang Pilipino (SIKAP); Historical: KM (1964–1967); MPKP (1967–1970s)
- Women's wing: Katipunan ng Bagong Pilipina
- Armed wing: Hukbalahap (1942–1954)
- Ideology: Communism; Marxism–Leninism
- International affiliation: IMCWP; Historical: Comintern (1935–1943)
- Colors: Red and Gold
- Slogan: "Mga anakpawis sa sandaigdig, magkaisa kayo!" (lit. "Proletarians of the world, unite!")
- Anthem: "The Internationale"
- Senate: 0 / 24
- House of Representatives: 0 / 317
- Provincial Governors: 0 / 82
- Provincial Vice Governors: 0 / 82
- Provincial Board Members: 0 / 840

Website
- pkp-1930.com

The Partido Komunista ng Pilipinas-1930 (PKP-1930), also known as the Philippine Communist Party, is a Marxist-Leninist party in the Philippines that was established on November 7, 1930. It uses the aforementioned appellation in order to distinguish itself from its better known splinter group, the Communist Party of the Philippines and the CPP-NPA-NDF armed conflict.

== History ==
The founding members of the PKP came from members of the Partido Obrero de Filipinas, a labor-centered party formed in opposition to the leading Nacionalista and Democrata Parties at the time. Most of the members of the Partido Obrero were also leading figures in the labor movement, including PKP founders Crisanto Evangelista, Antonino D. Ora, Jacinto Manahan, and Domingo Ponce. Evangelista and his group were increasingly being radicalized towards left-wing politics through their increasing involvement with the Comintern, Profintern, and the CPUSA. Particularly, in 1928, Evanglista, Manahan, and Cirilo Bognot went to the Soviet Union to attend the Profintern's Fourth Congress. These people were also leading figures in the Congreso Obrero de Filipinas, the leading trade federation at the time.

In 1928, conservative elements of the Congreso Obrero de Filipinas (COF) were alarmed by the increasing radicalization of Evangelista and his group, and took advantage of their absence by calling a national convention on May 1 of that year. The incumbent president, Francisco Varona was ousted along with Evangelista, and were replaced by Hilario Barroga and Domingo Ponce, respectively. Some authors claim the move was orchestrated by Evangelista's enemies in the COF: Ruperto Cristobal, Isabelo Tejada, and Antonio Paguia, however others dispute the nature of this election and point out that Ponce and Ora being elected to positions in the COF points to its increasing radicalization. In the previous year, the Partido Obrero almost received official backing from the COF, the resolution only being shot down by a single vote. Evangelista had plans for radical reorganization of the trade union movement, which would lay the groundwork for the communist movement in the Philippines. These plans were almost thwarted in 1928, but Evangelista chose to bide his time for the following year's conference.

The next year, Evangelista and his group submitted a draft thesis which called for measures such as the adoption of a collective leadership, establishment of a workers' party, the promotion of class struggle, and so on. The thesis was allowed to pass to the May convention, where the conservative group allegedly used dummy labor delegates to ensure that the radical measure was blocked. Evangelista and his group walked out of the convention, and the COF was split. Twelve days later on May 12, 1929, a new labor federation known as the Katipunan ng mga Anakpawis sa Pilipinas (KAP) was formed, consisting of 27 of the 35 unions of the COF. On August 26 of the next year, a new political party was organized from members of the KAP, the Partido Komunista ng Pilipinas. The party itself was formalized as an official entity on November 7 of the same year. These two dates correspond with the Cry of Pugad Lawin and the October Revolution, respectively, symbolically linking the PKP with the nationalist and the communist revolutions.

The newly formed PKP immediately set out with its propaganda effort. The PKP launched an aggressive organizational and propaganda drive among the peasants of Central Luzon and Manila, holding public meetings almost daily. In January 1931, the PKP opened its national headquarters in Quiapo, Manila, and also launched its official organ, the Titis (Spark), reminiscent of Lenin's Iskra.

During this time, multiple incidents were attributed to the communists. On January 10, 1931, a peasant uprising occurred in Tayug, Pangasinan. This was blamed on the communists, although the PKP itself was castigated by a foreign critic of not coordinating with the peasant rebels. Besides the Tayug revolt, other peasant uprisings that occurred during the time were attributed to the PKP, and at time the PKP took credit for them, although the truth was that at the time the PKP was weak organizationally. Most members, including Evangelista, believed that the root of the revolution should come from the urban centers, while people like Manahan, Feleo, Guillermo Capadocia, and Mateo del Castillo believed that a strong peasant base was important in achieving the communist revolution. Nevertheless, the PKP had no strong base in Central Luzon at the time.

In 1931, Ora died in an automobile accident in Nueva Ecija. He was then a high-ranking member of the PKP politburo and central committee, widely regarded to be second only to Evangelista. His funeral became the site of widespread demonstration, with as many as 50,000 workers marching through Manila. A wake was held in Ora's hometown and was attended by 3,000 peasants.

The most major incident concerning the first PKP was on May 1, 1931, when the communists were barred from holding their traditional Labor Day demonstration in Manila. The PKP instead transferred their celebration to Caloocan, under the auspices of the KAP. This permit, however, was also revoked hours before the start of the scheduled start of the parade. A contingent of the Philippine Constabulary, under Captain Rafael Jalandoni arrived to order Evangelista to cancel the parade. Evangelista instead raised his clenched fist and began an incendiary speech, and said:

Comrades or brethren, the municipal president, Mr. Aquino, has allowed us to hold the parade, but for reasons unknown to me the permit has been revoked. This shows that the big ones are persecuting and oppressing us, who are small, which they have no right to do.

After this, Abelardo Ramos cried out, "Let us die fighting them!" Evangelista attempted to continue his speech when the PC arrested him and Ramos. The assembled crowd then tried to advance on the constabulary but were forcibly dispersed by peace officers.

Based on these events, the Manila Court of First Instance, on September 14, 1931, passed a decision declaring both the PKP and KAP as illegal organizations, and sentencing twenty communist leaders of eight years and one day of banishment to the provinces. Evangelista was additionally sentenced with six months' imprisonment and a fine of 400 pesos for sedition. The convicted communists brought an appeal to the Supreme Court, which affirmed the Manila CFI decision on October 26, 1932.

The American administration in the Philippines acknowledged and recognized that the convicted communists such as Evangelista, Manahan, Capadocia, and Balgos were leaders in their trades and their cooperation would have been most beneficial. These men were given offers for executive clemency but were adamant in their refusal. Eventually Manahan would accept pardon from Governor Frank Murphy in 1935, partly due to ideological differences between him and Evangelista, and partly due to the intervention of Manuel Quezon. This, combined with Quezon assuming the presidency of the Commonwealth with his liberalism and genuine desire to garner the support of labor groups, allowed for an opening in rapprochement between him and Evangelista. The adoption of a united front against fascism by the Comintern also played a part in their release.

In 1936, James S. Allen, a high-ranking official of the CPUSA came to the Philippines to persuade Evangelista's group of accepting even a conditional pardon, under the argument that a united front must be maintained against world fascism. Allen then went to Quezon to successfully request the release of the communist leaders on December 31, 1936. He then returned in 1938 to secure an absolute pardon for the communist leaders, which was granted on December 24 of that same year. Given their full political rights, they were now able to act and implement the Comintern's call for a united-front movement against fascism.

Allen then mediated between Pedro Abad Santos' Partido Sosyalista ng Pilipinas (PSP) and Crisanto Evangelista's PKP to form a merger, despite their ideological differences.

Pedro previously founded the PSP in 1932 when the Partido Komunista ng Pilipinas (PKP) was outlawed by the Supreme Court. Two years later, together with his assistants Agapito del Rosario, Luis Taruc, Lino Dizon and others, he organized the Aguman ding Talapagobra ning Pilipinas (ATP) into the Aguman ding Maldang Talapagobra (AMT), similar to the general workers' unions in Spain, Mexico, and France, which advocated the expropriation of landed estates and friar lands, farmers' cooperative stores and the upliftment of peasants' living conditions. On November 7, 1938, during the anniversary of the October Revolution, members of the PKP and the PSP held a convention at the Manila Grand Opera House where they officially declared their merger as the Communist Party of the Philippines (merger of the Communist and Socialist Parties), but was simply referred to as the Communist Party of the Philippines for short. The three top elected officers of the new PKP were Evangelista, Abad Santos, and Capadocia, who were President, Vice President, and General Secretary, respectively.

In 1935, PKP was accepted into the Comintern. In 1937, the PKP was legalized again, under the Commonwealth in response to the growing threat of fascism in Germany and militarist Japan. In 1938, the Socialist Party was merged into the PKP. The PKP participated in a popular front for municipal elections in 1940, which did well on the island of Luzon, where six communist mayors were elected.

=== Armed resistance, 1942–1954 ===
During World War II, the PKP helped organize the fight against the Japanese invasion. Under PKP leadership, the Hukbalahap (People's Army against Japan) was created in 1942 under the leadership of Luis Taruc and Vicente Lava. The Hukbalahap carried on a struggle against the Japanese occupation for the next three years. After the end of Japanese occupation, the PKP found itself in a considerably strengthened position in the working class and peasant movements. The Congress of Labor Organizations was created in July 1945 under PKP management. In 1946 PKP participated in the presidential elections within the Democratic Alliance.

In 1948, the PKP began an armed struggle against the government. The party was banned that year. In early 1950, the PKP created the People's Liberation Army (Hukbong Mapagpalaya ng Bayan) which was made up of about 10,000 soldiers. On October 18, 1950, the entire secretariat of the Central Committee of the PKP was arrested, including General Secretary José Lava, following the earlier capture of the Politburo in Manila (and would remain in prison for the next two decades). José had taken over the leadership when his brother Vicente died, and another brother, Jesus, took over after José's capture.

In the course of the armed struggle, PKP and the People's Liberation Army sustained large losses. By the end of 1954, the armed struggle was effectively over, although it took a few more years to die out, after which the PKP pursued a course of peaceful (legal and illegal) action. Although they created another guerilla force similar to the Hukbong Mapagpalaya ng Bayan, known as the Bagong Hukbong Mapagpalaya ng Bayan; more commonly known as the Army ng Bayan (or Ermeng Bayan according to the CPP), under Pedro Taruc and Sumulong.

=== Split ===
Remnants of the PKP worked from the underground to rebuild their mass organizations and affiliated groups. In 1964, Jose Maria Sison co-founded the Kabataang Makabayan (Patriotic Youth) with Nilo Tayag. This organization rallied the Filipino youth against the Vietnam War, against the Marcos presidency, and corrupt politicians. On December 26, 1968, he formed and chaired the Central Committee of the Communist Party of the Philippines (CPP), an organization within the Communist Party founded on Marxist–Leninist-Mao Zedong Thought, stemming from his own experiences as a youth leader, labor, and land reform activist. This is known as the First Great Rectification Movement where Sison and other radical youths criticized the existing Party's leadership and failure. The reformed CPP included Maoism within the political line as well as the struggle for a National Democratic Revolution in two stages, consisting of a "Protracted People's War" as its first part to be followed by a Socialist Revolution.

Soon after this, the leadership of the PKP sought to eliminate and marginalize Sison. However, the reorganized CPP had a larger base and renewed political line that attracted thousands to join its ranks. The old leadership and its followers was pro-Soviet, while the other, mostly younger faction was oriented towards Maoism. On December 26, 1968, the Maoist faction announced it was re-establishing the Communist Party of the Philippines. Over time, the Maoist party eclipsed the pro-Soviet faction, which is now commonly referred to as PKP-1930 since the 1980s.

According to historian Joseph Scalice, the PKP, in its alliance with the Marcos administration, was responsible for more communist deaths "in the wake of the declaration of martial law than were killed by the dictatorship", as they killed members of a growing youth faction in the party called the Marxist-Leninist Group (MLG) opposing the imposition of martial law and attempting to splinter from the PKP.

The PKP-1930 survived the martial law era as pro-government supporters, after being pardoned by President Ferdinand Marcos. They supported the government in its land reform program, attempt for land collectivization, and the "Democratic Revolution from the center" envisioned by Marcos. The Maoist party continues to fight to this day. As of now, the PKP-1930 is a minor party and issues the publication Sulong! Some party members were elected to public office in the 2013 and 2016 elections in the country.
