= Bell Trade Act =

1946 U.S. trade legislation

The Bell Trade Act of 1946, also known as the Philippine Trade Act, was an act passed by the United States Congress specifying policy governing trade between the Philippines and the United States following independence of the Philippines from the United States. The United States Congress offered $800 million for post World War II rebuilding funds if the Bell Trade Act was ratified by the Philippine Congress. The specifics of the act required the 1935 Constitution of the Philippines be amended. The Philippine Congress approved the measure on July 2, two days before independence from the United States of America, and on September 18, 1946, approved a plebiscite to amend the Constitution of the Philippines.

Authored by Missouri Congressman C. Jasper Bell, the Bell Trade Act required:

- Preferential tariffs on US products imported into the Philippines;
- A 2:1 fixed exchange rate between the Philippine peso and the United States dollar;
- No restrictions on currency transfers from the Philippines to the United States;
- "Parity rights" granting U.S. citizens and corporations rights to Philippine natural resources equal to (in parity with) those of Philippine citizens, contrary to Article XIII in the 1935 Philippine Constitution, necessitating a constitutional amendment.

The Bell Act, particularly the parity clause, was seen by critics as an inexcusable surrender of national sovereignty. The pressure of the sugar barons, particularly those of President Roxas's home region of Western Visayas, and other landowner interests, however, was irresistible.

In 1955, the Laurel–Langley Agreement revised the Bell Trade Act. This treaty abolished the United States authority to control the exchange rate of the peso, made parity privileges reciprocal, extended the sugar quota, and extended the time period for the reduction of other quotas and for the progressive application of tariffs on Philippine goods exported to the United States.

== 1947 Philippine Parity Rights plebiscite ==
As required by the Bell Trade Act, a plebiscite was held in the Philippines to amend the Philippine Constitution to provide for "parity rights" between American and Philippine citizens.

Prior to the plebiscite, the Constitutional amendment had to be approved by the Philippine Congress, which required a 3/4 vote by the Philippine House and Philippine Senate. The 3/4 vote was obtained only by the denial of seats in the House to six members of the leftist Democratic Alliance and three from the Nacionalista Party on grounds of fraud and violent campaign tactics during the April 1946 election. The administration view that the amendment had passed was challenged before the Philippine Supreme Court on the grounds that approval by 3/4 of the full membership was required, not 3/4 of the sitting members, and was decided in favor of the administration position.

The plebiscite was held on March 11, 1947, and voters approved the amendment 79 to 21%. Forty percent of voters participated in the plebiscite.

Are you in favor of approving the parity amendment to the constitution, allowing U.S. citizens the right to utilize Philippine natural resources?
Choice	Votes	%
For	432,833	78.89
Against	115,853	21.11
Required majority		50
Total	548,686	100.00

== See also ==
- Politics of the Philippines
- Philippine elections
