= Luis Taruc =

Philippine Marxist–Leninist politician (1913–2005)

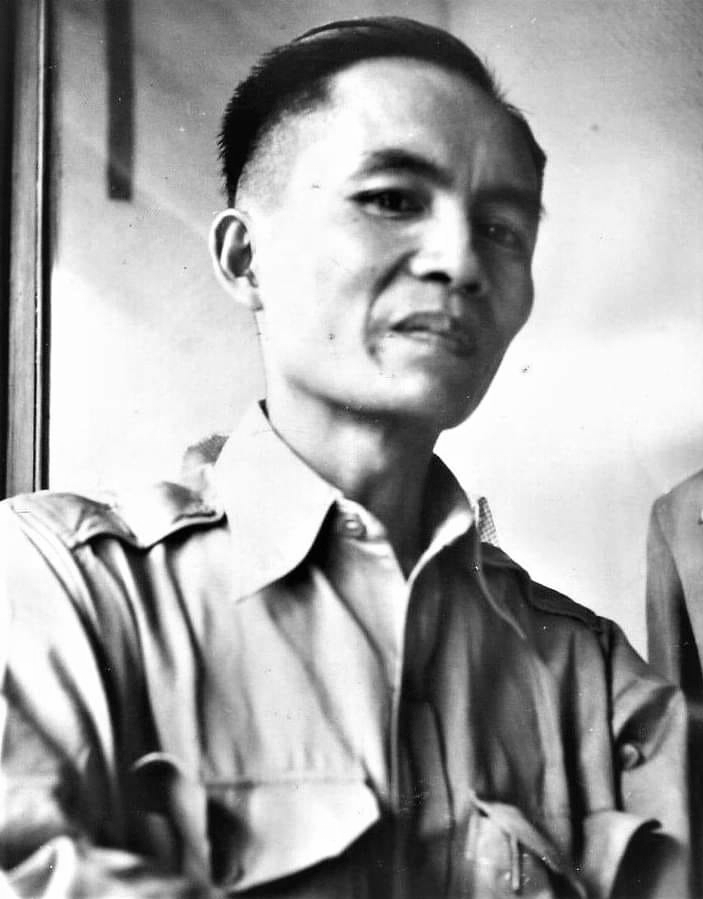
- Taruc in 1946

Member of the Regular Batasang Pambansa from the Agricultural sector
- In office June 30, 1984 – March 25, 1986

Member of the Interim Batasang Pambansa from the Agricultural sector
- In office June 12, 1978 – June 5, 1984

Member of the House of Representatives from Pampanga's 2nd district
- In office May 25, 1946 – June 1, 1946
- Preceded by: José Fausto
- Succeeded by: Artemio Macalino

Personal details
- Born: Luis Mangalus Taruc; June 21, 1913 San Luis, Pampanga, Philippine Islands
- Died: May 4, 2005 (aged 91) Quezon City, Philippines
- Party: Independent (1954–2005); Partido Komunista (1938–1954); Socialist Party (1935–1938)
- Other political affiliations: Democratic Alliance (1945–1949)
- Spouse(s): Feliciana Bernabe (d. 1938); Enna Cura (d. 1946); Gregoria Calma (d. 1952)
- Relations: Francesca Taruc (granddaughter)
- Children: 1
- Education: University of Manila
- Known for: Leader of the Hukbalahap
- Nickname: Ka Luis

Military service
- Allegiance: Philippine Commonwealth; Philippine Communist Party
- Branch/service: People's Liberation Army
- Years of service: 1941–1945; 1946–1954
- Rank: Supremo
- Commands: Hukbalahap
- Battles/wars: World War II; Philippine Resistance; Hukbalahap Rebellion

Luis Mangalus Taruc (Tagalog pronunciation: [luˈis tɐˈɾuk]; June 21, 1913 – May 4, 2005) was a Filipino socialist politician and rebel during the agrarian unrest of the 1930s until the end of the Cold War. He was the leader of the Hukbalahap group (from Hukbong Bayan Laban sa Hapon) between 1942 and 1950. His involvement with the movement came after his initiation to the problems of agrarian Filipinos when he was a student in the early 1930s. During World War II, Taruc led the Hukbalahap in guerrilla operations against the Japanese occupants of the Philippines.

Influenced by his socialist idol Pedro Abad Santos of San Fernando, and inspired by earlier Katipunan revolutionaries such as Felipe Salvador, Taruc joined the Aguman ding Maldang Tala-pagobra (AMT, Kapampangan for 'Union of Peasant Workers') and in 1938, the Partido Sosyalista ng Pilipinas (Socialist Party of the Philippines). The latter merged with the Partido Komunista ng Pilipinas as part of the Common Front strategy, and Taruc assumed the role of Commander-in-Chief of the military wing created to fight the Japanese.

After the war against Japan, the Hukbalahap continued their demands for agrarian reform. Taruc and seven colleagues were elected to the House of Representatives, but the government of Manuel Roxas did not allow them to take their seats in Congress. The Taruc faction opposed the parity rights that the U.S. required from post-independence Philippines as a condition for rehabilitation funding. In the next five years, Taruc would give up on the parliamentary struggle and once more take up arms. At the height of its popularity, the Hukbalahap reached a fighting strength estimated at between 10,000 and 30,000. In 2017, the National Historical Commission of the Philippines declared Taruc a hero for being a "nationalist and defender of the rights of farmers and workers".

== Early life and career ==
Luis Mangalus Taruc was born of peasant stock in the barrio of Santa Monica, township of San Luis, Pampanga on 21 June 1913. Luis states, "In my youth, the Christian faith dominated my spiritual life. But the landlord dominated the material life I knew." At age eight, Luis attended public school in San Miguel, Bulacan. At fifteen, he attended high school in Tarlac City. He attended to the University of Manila for two years (June 1932–December 1934), studying medicine and law, but no longer able to afford the expenses, returned to Batasan without getting a degree to set up a tailor shop with his brother. As a teen he was inspired by the stories of the Katipuneros who had fought for independence and for agrarian reform against Spain. Certain people within his home village and province came to regard him as the incarnation of the prominent Katipunan leader Felipe Salvador. He was influenced by Pedro Abad Santos, a Marxist, whom Luis regarded as a true socialist. In June 1935, he married Feliciana Bernabe, and his son Romeo was born in March 1936.Before the end of 1935, he joined Santos as a full-time organizer of the Socialist Party of the Philippines, which numbered a few hundred members and several thousand sympathizers. His wife died in Dec. 1938, suffering from goiter and anemia. He then married Enna Cura on 4 June 1939. Luis would serve time in prison three times before the war, in his struggle for the militant workers' and peasants' unions. Enna died of sepsis and diabetes on 8 March 1946. Luis later married Gregoria Calma (Liza). She was killed by government soldiers on 11 April 1952.

== World War II ==
On November 7, 1938, the Philippine Socialist Party and the Communist Party of the Philippines merged, forming a united front "to fight against fascism and war", though each party retained its own organizations until 1941. They pledged loyalty to the Philippine and United States government's anti-Japanese crusade in December 1941. Following the Japanese invasion, Taruc formed the Hukbalahap (Hukbo ng Bayan Laban sa Hapon or the "People’s Army Against the Japanese" in English), along with Casto Alejandrino and other guerrillas, in central Luzon on March 29, 1942, became its commander-in-chief, and chairman of the Communist Party's Military Committee.

He led a large people's army against the Japanese invaders, and their "puppet constabulary", as Supremo Luis Taruc, or "Lu-Lu" ("the racing one"), then "Alipato" ("the flying spark that spreads a fire"). According to Luis, "There was a period when we had an American officer officially collaborating with our work." Taruc credited his prominence through his "identification with the simple, sincere, and courageous peasants." However, Luis noted, "...most of the time, the American authorities were suspicious of this unconventional army whose politics they suspected." Yet, the Hukbalahap under Taruc did become an effective armed guerrilla force.

== Post-war years ==
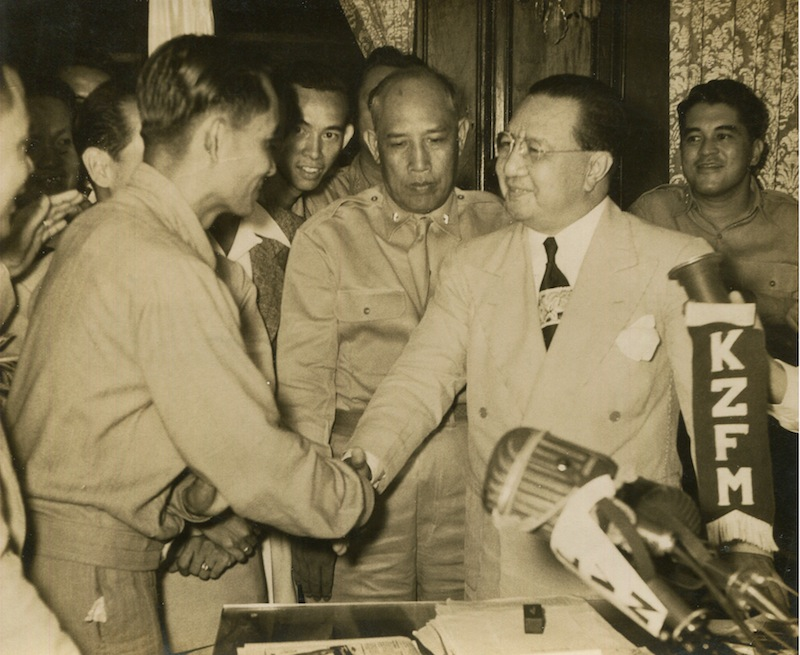
Taruc shakes hands with president Elpidio Quirino at Malacañang Palace, 21 June 1948

Taruc was elected to the Philippine House of Representatives in 1946 as a member of the Democratic Alliance He and five other elected Democratic Alliance candidates opposed the constitutional amendment that would give American businessmen parity rights with Filipinos in exchange for US rehabilitation funding. In particular, Luis opposed the Bell Trade Act, the Parity Amendment to the Constitution, and the Military Bases Agreement. To secure the majority necessarily to pass the amendment President Manuel Roxas arranged for Taruc and the other oppositional Democratic Alliance members to be ejected from office by the Commission on Elections on the grounds that they had been committing election fraud and terrorism.

Taruc went underground in late 1946, following failed negotiations with President Roxas, and the Huks soon numbered 10,000 armed fighters. Subsequent negotiations with President Elpidio Quirino in June and August 1948 also failed. By the presidential elections of 1949, the Huks had abandoned electoral politics in favor of armed insurgency. The Huks controlled most of central Luzon, the “rice basket” of the Philippines, including two provincial capitals, by 1950. Their motto, "a democratic peace, or martyrdom." Luis states, "The peasants' hatred was founded on centuries of exploitation and oppression, feudal landlordism, and bad government. But the rich...were driven by fear of losing their power and their social privilege...this was naked class war." In the Politburo meeting of December 1949 to January 1950, the Huks were reorganized as the HMB, "Hukbo Mapagpalaya ng Bayan", or "People's Army of Liberation", with Luis as a Politburo Supervisor (PBS) for the Party's Regional Committee, Reco 2, in the Zambales Mountains. By November 1950, Luis was removed from his post of command entirely. By then, the Huks had 15,000 armed men, and the country was embroiled in a "miniature civil war", with ambushes on the major highways common.

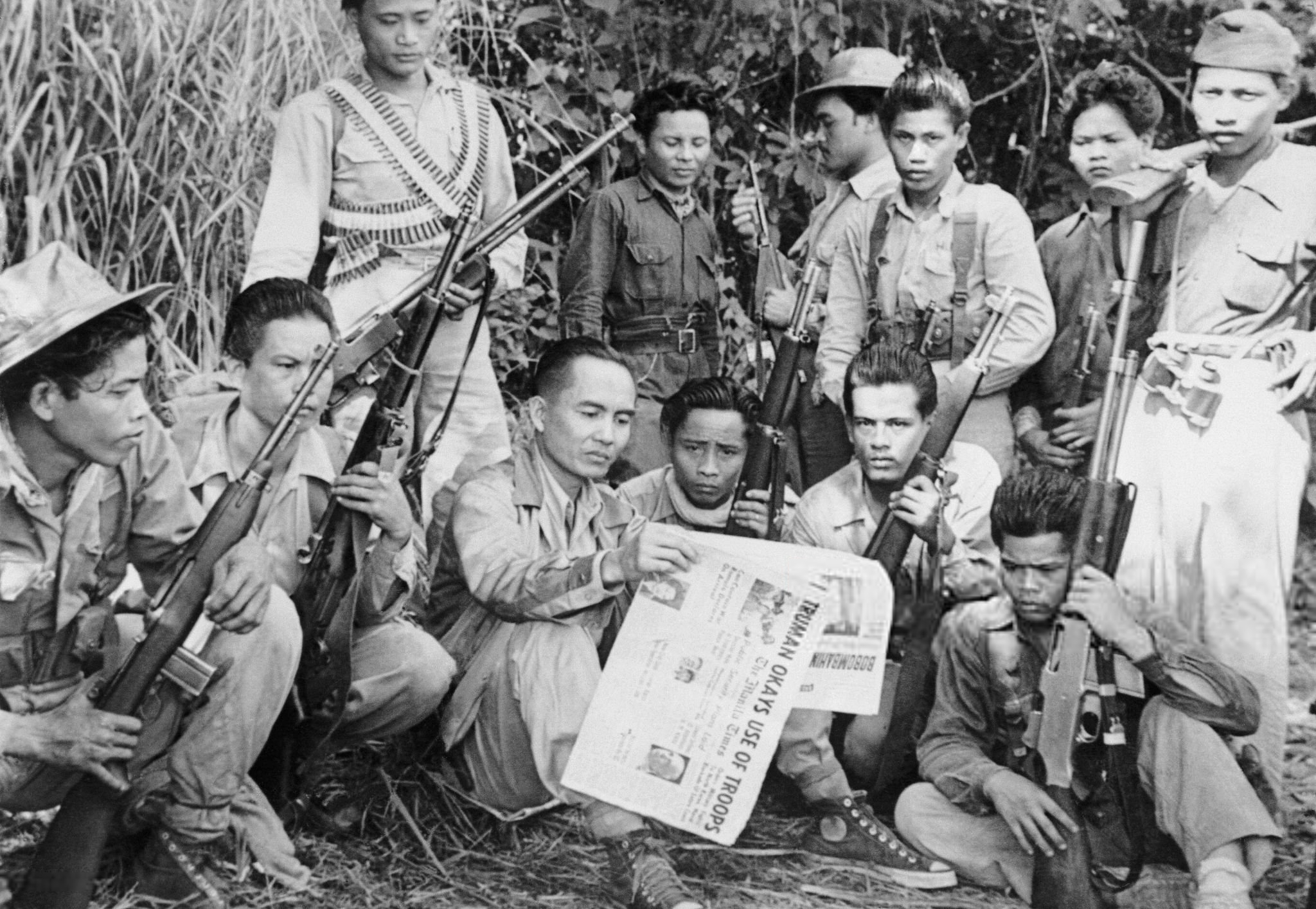
"Luis M. Taruc, head man of the Huk Guerrillas in the Philippines, who has often been reported dead by Philippine government intelligence, proves it isn't so by posing for a picture reading a Manila newspaper dated July 1. He is surrounded by members of his guerrilla band. July 12, 1950."

President Quirino assigned Ramon Magsaysay, secretary of national defense, to combat the Huk insurgency. On 18 October 1950, Magsaysay captured the Secretariat, including the general secretary José Lava, following the earlier capture of the Politburo in Manila. Magsaysay attracted peasant support by reforming the Army and Constabulary. After the 1951 Central Committee meeting, a policy of "preservation and conservation of strength...for a long and bitter struggle" was adopted, and Luis departed with a group of ninety men and seven women, for the Sierra Madre Mountains. The latter part of 1952 was spent hiding in the Mount Arayat area. In January 1953, Luis was suspended from the Politburo and Secretariat for his "Call for Peace". On February 10, 1954, Manuel Manahan and Benigno Aquino Jr., appointed as President Ramon Magsaysay's representatives, met with Luis Taruc. After four months of negotiations, Taruc surrendered unconditionally to the government on 17 May 1954, effectively ending the Huk rebellion. On 15 June 1954, Luis met with President Magsaysay and Gen. Eulogio Balao at Camp Murphy, where Luis agreed to a trial.

Taruc's trial started in August 1954, where he pleaded guilty to rebellion, "in the spirit of my agreement with the president", and sentenced to 12 years of imprisonment, plus a "huge fine". From 1956 to 1958, Luis was put on trial for the execution of Feliciano Gardiner, Japanese occupation governor of Tarlac, for which he was found guilty and sentenced to four life sentences. His petition to President Diosdado Macapagal for executive clemency and amnesty to political prisoners in exchange for support for the President's social welfare program was ignored. Taruc was pardoned by President Ferdinand Marcos on September 11, 1968, and Marcos gained the former Huk leader's support. After his release, he continued to work for agrarian reforms. His struggle on behalf of the poor farmers persuaded local and national leaders to strengthen the legal rights of farm workers and led to a more equitable distribution of farm land. In his later years Taruc claimed to have never been a real communist, but rather always advocated Christian democratic socialism; he supported land reform strengthening the rights of local, small farmers over corporations and hereditary feudal elite.

== Legacy ==
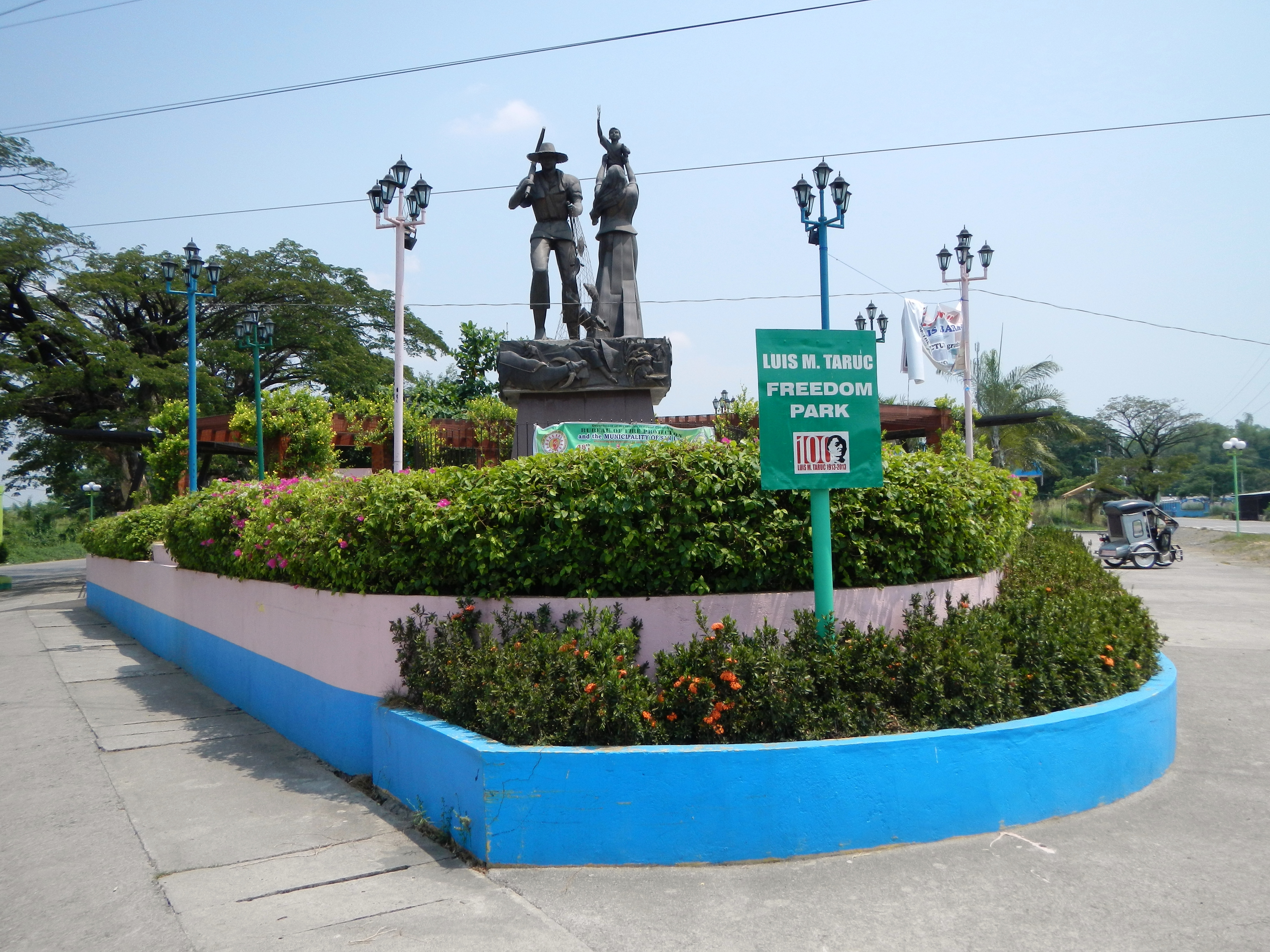
Luis M. Taruc Freedom Park in San Luis, Pampanga in Barangay San Sebastian, beside Barangay Santa Cruz Poblacion along the Baliuag-Candaba-San Luis Provincial Road

Taruc dictated Born of the People (1953) to American communist and ghost writer William Pomeroy. Luis Taruc used Alipato, meaning "spark that spreads a fire", as his pseudonym. "Born of the People" was Nelson Mandela's reference on peasant resistance and guerrilla warfare when he was the commander in chief of the uMkhonto we Sizwe (Spear of the Nation).

Historical markers in San Luis, Pampanga

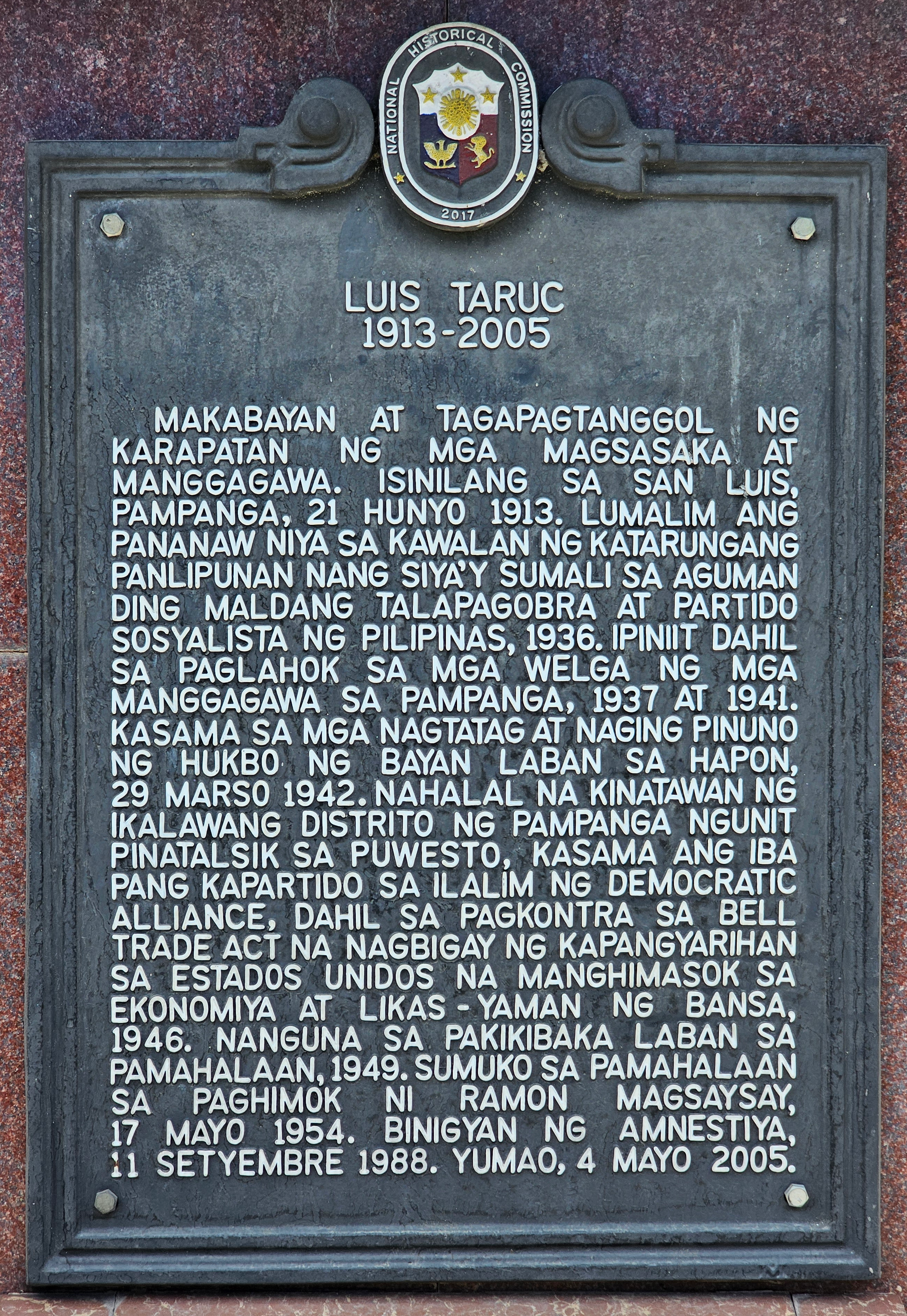
Dedicated 2017

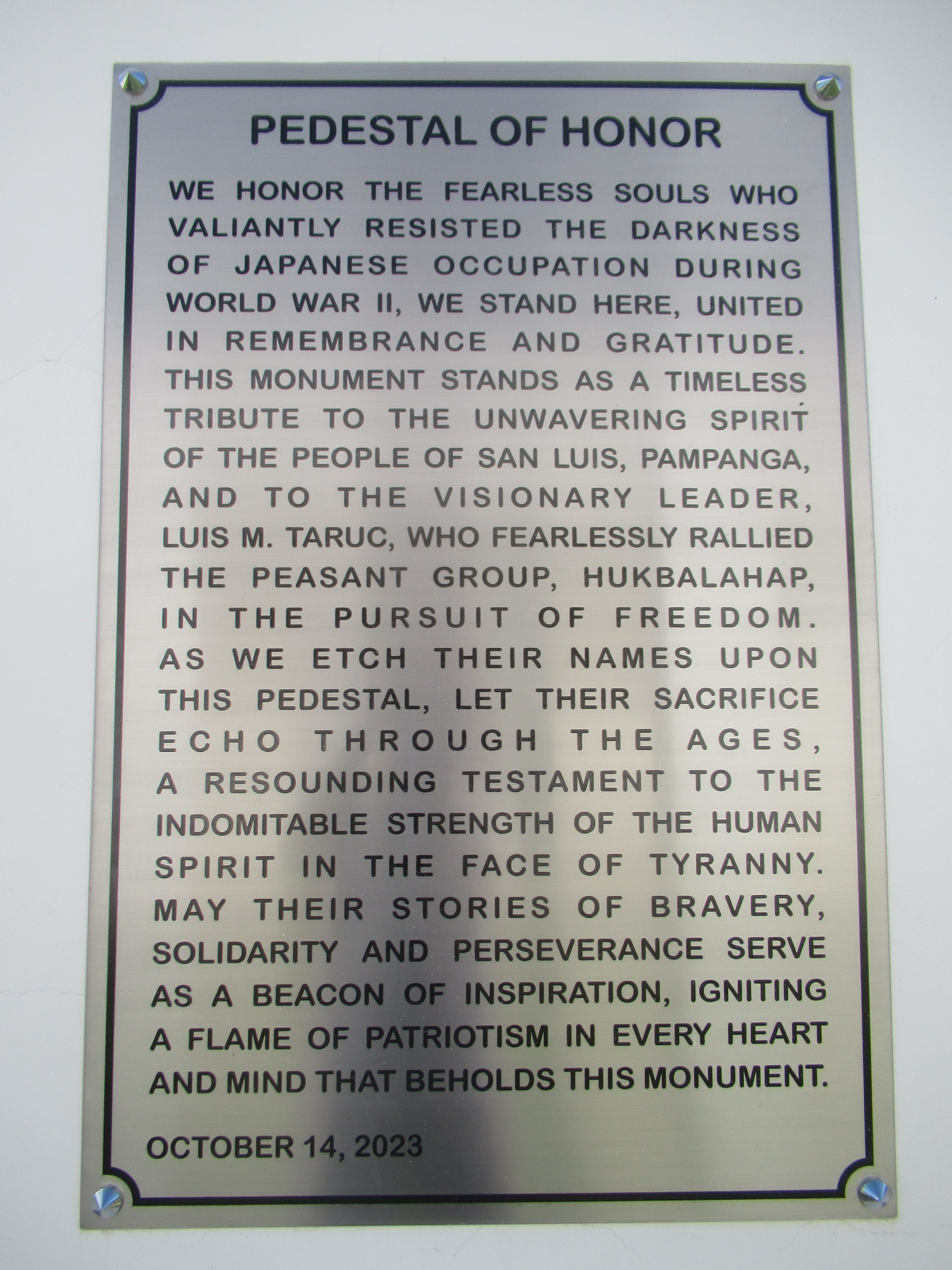
Dedicated 2023

While in New Bilibid Prison, Taruc composed He Who Rides the Tiger (1967). Luis wrote, "I know now from experience, that the nationalism of the Communists is indeed opportunism, and that they use it for their own ends. Any nationalist who makes an ally of the Communist is going for a ride on a tiger." Additionally, Luis wrote, "For ruthlessness and cruelty are alien to Christian thought, and when men in the Free World use such methods, they do so in defiance of their own morality and ideals. The atheist Communist, however, believes that the end justifies the means, or in Lenin's words, 'Morality is subordinate to the class struggle.' For this reason, the Communist can pursue a policy of terror and cruelty with a clear conscience."

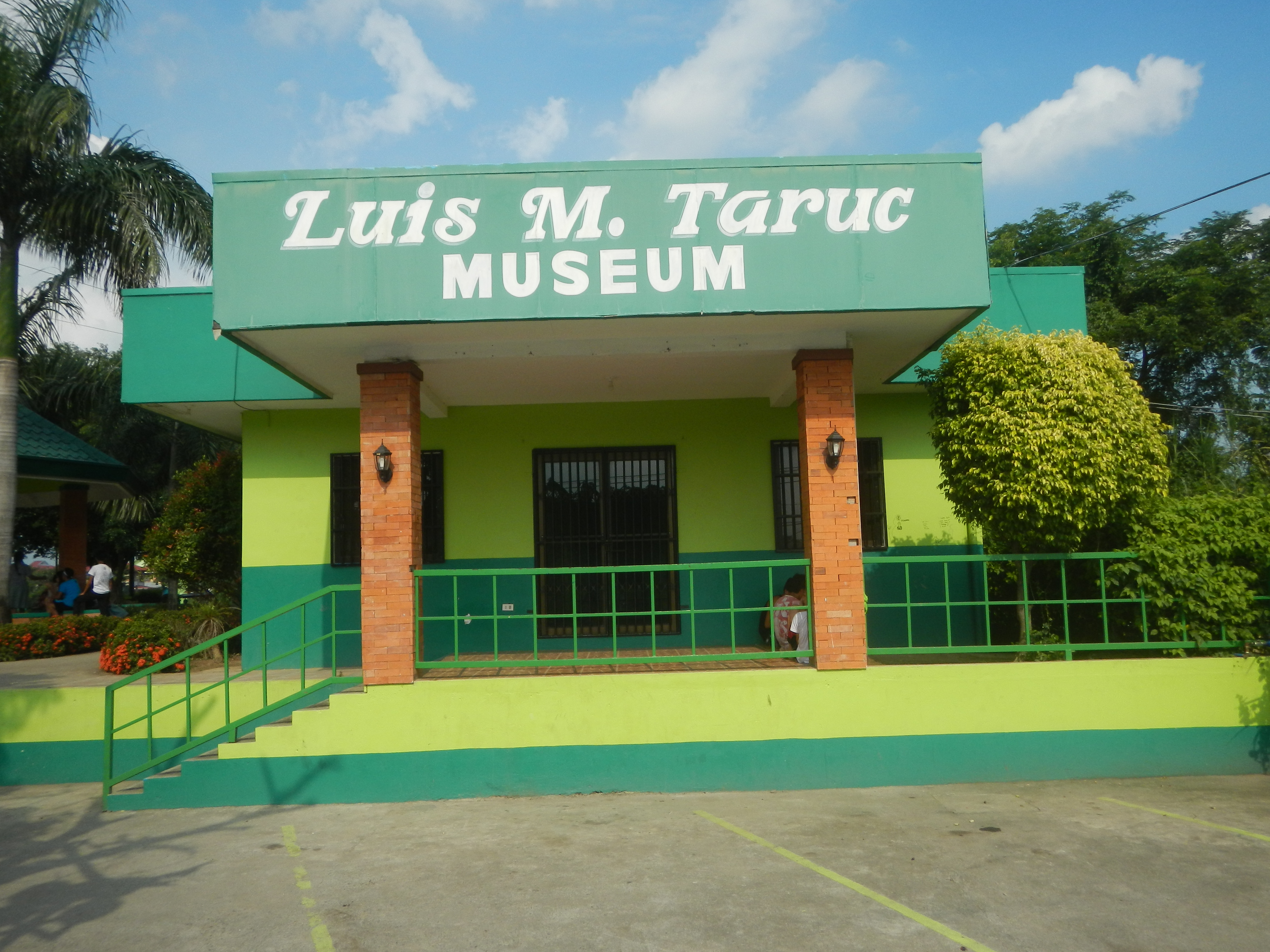
Taruc Museum in San Luis, Pampanga

In 1985, Taruc would tell F. Sionil Jose that one of the reasons for the failure of the insurgency was that dissenters were killed. He also said that dogmatic fundamentalism scared away many potential allies. The Huk movement commanded an estimated 170,000 armed troops with a base of two million civilian supporters at the apex of their power in 1952. In 2003, he explained to historian Keith Thor Carlson that he attributed the revolution's failure to the dogmatism of members of the politburo's Russian-trained elite, in particular José and Jesus Lava, an accusation that runs contrary to the views of the Lavas and William Pomeroy who countered that Taruc suffered from a cult of personality.

Several Huk veterans organizations dispute the credit heaped on Taruc for organizing the Hukbalahap during World War II. They contend that Taruc only joined the movement when several prominent Huk leaders were captured and executed by the Japanese, and that there were several Huk brigades operating in concert, under Castro Alejandrino, Eusebio Aquino, and Mariano Franco among others.

== Death ==
On May 4, 2005, Taruc died of a heart attack in St. Luke's Medical Center in Quezon City at the age of 91, a month before his 92nd birthday.

Taruc was initially buried at Loyola Memorial Park in Marikina. In accordance with his wishes to be buried in his hometown, his remains were exhumed and cremated in 2018, and the ashes were given an official ceremony at the Pampanga Provincial Capitol in San Fernando before they were reinterred at the San Luis Freedom Park on the occasion of his 105th birth anniversary on June 21. In 2023, another monument dedicated to him and the Hukbalahap was opened at the Garden of Peace Memorial Park in his home village of Santa Monica.

== See also ==
- Hukbalahap rebellion
