= José Lava =

Filipino communist politician (1912–2000)

José Baltazar Lava

General Secretary of the Philippine Communist Party
- In office May 1948 – February 1951
- Preceded by: Jorge Frianeza
- Succeeded by: Jesus Lava

Personal details
- Born: 1912 Bulakan, Bulacan Philippine Islands
- Died: 2000 (aged 87–88)
- Party: Partido Komunista ng Pilipinas-1930
- Children: Aida Lava Dizon
- Relatives: Vicente; Jesus
- Education: University of the Philippines

José Baltazar Lava, also known as Peping or Harry, was the general secretary of the Partido Komunista ng Pilipinas-1930 (PKP), from 1948 until his arrest in 1950. He spent the following two decades in prison and another two decades in exile in Prague, Czechoslovakia.

== Early life and political career ==
Lava was born in 1912 to a moderately affluent landowning family of six brothers and three sisters in Bulacan. He obtained a degree in accounting at the University of the Philippines School of Business after graduating high school in 1929. He then went to the University of the Philippines College of Law in 1933 and graduated in 1937. He became a Communist Party member right after passing the bar late in 1937.

Lava became general secretary of the Central Committee of the PKP in May 1948, shortly after his older brother Vicente Lava died in 1947. Lava was previously a politburo member and the chief of the party's finance committee.

The PKP began a violent insurrection against the government in 1948 and was banned by the government the same year. In early 1950, the PKP established the People's Liberation Army (Hukbong Mapagpalaya ng Bayan), which was made up of about 10,000 soldiers. The entire secretariat of the Central Committee of the PKP, including Lava, was arrested on October 18, 1950, following the earlier capture of the politburo in Manila. Lava was succeeded by his younger brother Jesus Lava in February 1951.

Lava was sentenced to life imprisonment in May 1951. He was released from prison on 4 January 1970 and fled to Prague, Czechoslovakia. While living in self-imposed exile, he authored several books on the communist movement in the Philippines.

After the fall of communism in Czechoslovakia in 1989, Lava returned to the Philippines in 1990 and died there in 2000.
