= Jesus Lava =

Filipino politician and communist

General Secretary of the Communist Party of the Philippines
- In office February 1951 – May 21, 1964
- Preceded by: Jose Lava
- Succeeded by: Provisional Politburo (Note: Chaired by Paco Lava.)

Member of the Philippine House of Representatives from Bulacan's First District
- The office was not taken

Personal details
- Born: Jesus Baltazar Lava; May 15, 1914 Bulacan, Philippine Islands
- Died: January 21, 2003 (aged 88)
- Cause of death: Prostate cancer
- Resting place: Bulakan Catholic Cemetery, Bulacan
- Party: Partido Komunista ng Pilipinas-1930 (from 1942)
- Other political affiliations: Democratic Alliance
- Education: University of the Philippines

Jesus Baltazar Lava (May 15, 1914 – January 21, 2003) was the Secretary General of the first Communist Party of the Philippines (PKP) from 1950.

== Career ==
Jesus Lava became the Secretary General of the pro-Soviet PKP after the arrest of his brother José Lava. In 1968, part of the membership of the party split to create a new Maoist Communist Party of the Philippines (CPP). Lava, the General Secretary of the already disappearing PKP, was labelled a "counterrevolutionary revisionist".

== Family ==
Jesus Lava was the youngest of nine children of Adeodato Lava and Maria Baltazar. The Lavas were a prominent family in Bulacan in the Philippines.
