= Democratic Alliance (Philippines) =

Defunct left-wing political party in the Philippines

- Leader: Luis Taruc
- Founders: Luis Taruc
- Founded: 1945
- Dissolved: 1949
- Ideology: Socialism; Agrarian reform
- Political position: Left wing
- Colors: Red

The Democratic Alliance was a leftist party in the Philippines created on July 15, 1945, primarily composed of members of the National Peasants Union of the Hukbalahap, the Committee of Labor Organizations of the Communist Party of the Philippines, the Filipino Blue Eagle Guerrillas, and other organizations. The party supported and endorsed the bid of incumbent president Sergio Osmeña and the Nacionalista Party during the 1946 presidential elections against Manuel Roxas and the Nacionalista's liberal wing (now the Liberal Party) due to the latter's sympathetic attitude toward Filipino collaborators of the Japanese during World War II and close affiliation with "vested-interest landlord groups".

== History ==
With the success of the Roxas bid for presidency, six candidates from the Democratic Alliance who were elected in the 1946 Philippine House elections were prevented from taking office due to allegations of fraud and violent campaign tactics during the election. These were Luis Taruc (Pampanga, 2nd district), Amado Yuzon (Pampanga, 1st district), Dr. Jesus Lava, José Cando (Nueva Ecija, 1st district), Constancio Padilla (Nueva Ecija, 2nd district), and Alejandro Simpauco (Tarlac, 2nd district). Their absence from Congress helped President Roxas ensure the passage of the parity rights amendment in the 1935 Constitution of the Philippines required under the Bell Trade Act of the United States Congress. The Bell Trade Act, also known as the Philippine Trade Act, required that the rights to Philippine natural resources that Philippine citizens and corporations enjoyed be equally extended to citizens and corporations of the United States. The constitutional amendment, known as the Parity Amendment, was ratified in a plebiscite on May 11, 1947.

Five of the six Democratic Alliance candidates were allowed to take their seats once the amendment was approved. Following these congressional decisions, many in the Democratic Alliance felt the government biased towards US foreign policy, and resumed the Huk Rebellion.

== Electoral performance ==
=== Presidential and vice presidential elections ===
Year	Presidential election				Vice presidential election			
Year	Candidate	Votes	Vote share	Result	Candidate	Votes	Vote share	Result
1946	None (Note: Party endorsed candidacy of Sergio Osmeña (Nacionalista).)			Manuel Roxas (Liberal)	None (Note: Party endorsed candidacy of Amang Rodriguez from the (Nacionalista))			Elpidio Quirino (Liberal)

=== Legislative elections ===
Congress of the Philippines
House of Representatives					Senate					
Year	Seats won	Votes	Share	Result	Year	Seats won	Votes	Share	Ticket	Result
1946	6 / 98	152,410	6.52%	Liberal dominated	1946	0 / 24	44,718	0.25%	Single party ticket	Nacionalista win 15/24 seats
