= 1937–1941 Pampanga peasant unrests =

Peasant-led unrests in Pampanga

1937 – 1941 Pampanga peasant unrests
- Part of Great Depression in the Philippines
- Date: 1937 – December 1941 (Note: sporadic attacks by peasant forces still persists until 1942 despite Japanese occupation)
- Location: Pampanga
- Caused by: Economic downturn and massive unemployment following the Great Depression
- Methods: Demonstrations; Civil unrest; Arson; Looting; Assassinations; Terrorism
- Result: Deployment of the Philippine Army and the Philippine Constabulary; Suppression of politicians with socialist backing; Illegalization of labor strikes; Ban on peasant organizations meeting

Parties
Commonwealth of the Philippines: Department of Labor; Court of Industrial Relations (CIR); Cawal ning Capayapan (Knights of Peace) (Note: Private army of Pampanga governor Sotero Baluyut); Philippine Army; Philippine Constabulary	Sugar central workers, sugar and rice tenant farmers; Aguman ding Maldang Talapagobra; Partido Komunista ng Pilipinas (PKP); Popular Front (left-wing faction); Kalipunang Pambansa ng mga Magsasaka sa Pilipinas (KPMP); Pasudeco Workers' Union

Number
14,000+ Cawal ning Capayapan men (1940); 700+ Philippine Constabulary troopers (June 1938 – March 1939); Additional 200+ Philippine Constabulary troopers (1941)	20,000+ labor strikers (1939) (Note: actual number of participants (including the number of peasant forces attacking Cawals) unknown)

Casualties
- Death: Unknown
- Injuries: Unknown

Since 1937, there were series of peasant-led violence, civil disorder, and terrorism in Pampanga as a result of falling sugar prices and worsening economic conditions in the Philippine Islands during the Great Depression. The demonstrations started as formal protests in the early 1930s directed towards the Department of Labor, later fuelling into violence between sugar landlords and tenants reaching its peak in 1939.

After the killing of a migrant worker in Pampanga in 1939, violence intensified with rice tenants joining the sugar workers in the chaos. By February 1939, President Manuel Quezon traveled to Pampanga to calm the violence but was unheeded. Violence continued until the eve of the Japanese invasion in the Philippines.

== Background ==
=== Economic downturn during the Great Depression ===
In 1936, a Department of Labor survey found that 43,865 people were unemployed in Pampanga. Governor General Frank Murphy had voiced concerns about unemployment in the sugar industry as early as 1934, but it was not until 1937 that the media began to highlight the issue. The 1936 Department of Labor survey suggested that opening public lands for settlement could help with unemployment in farming areas, but resettlement was not a practical solution for Kapampangan local workers, who preferred to stay in their communities or move only to nearby areas like southern Tarlac.

In 1936 and early 1937, a rise in sugar prices, rice cultivation by casamac, and benefit payments helped avoid severe impacts from export production limits. It was not until late 1937, falling sugar prices and inevitable layoffs caused unrest in Pampanga. Further fuelling the frustrations among sugar tenants was the sugar planter's tactics to minimize tenants' shares of sugar by providing false mill reports and withholding bonus information. Some switched to wage systems, increasing tenant dependency on seasonal jobs and reducing their income. A 1939 study published by the Philippine Council, Institute of Pacific Relations analyzed Philippine sugar industry wages and concluded that the "scale of wages is much too low, being only one-half that set by law." The study also pointed out that sugar planters were reluctant to comply with the government's minimum wage act.

Although the fall of sugar prices affected other regions such as Negros, Larkin (1993) pointed out that Pampanga had a history of radicalism among tenant farmers, hence Pampanga had a higher intensity of violence.

=== Transformation into violence ===
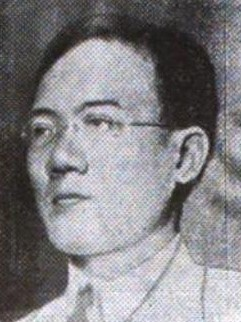
Ramon Torres, Secretary of Labor from 1933 to 1936

Originally beginning as formal protests with tenant demonstrations directed towards Department of Labor secretary Ramon Torres, it escalated to theft of sugar sacks from bodegas. By mid-1937, violence grew in Pampanga's sugar regions, leading landlords to form a protective group. In July 1937, workers on the Toledo estate in Floridablanca demanded a wage increase, sparking strikes that spread to nearby properties. By early 1938, strikes reached more areas, including Lubao and Guagua, and extended as far as Concepcion, Tarlac. Protests included burning cane fields, resulting in significant financial losses for landowners. When fields were burned prematurely, it reduced the sugar content and value of the cane, serving as a tactic to intimidate landlords.

In early 1939, Pampanga experienced widespread strikes and protests. Tensions flared after the killing of a migrant worker in Magalang, leading to increased hostility between different labor groups. Cane fields burned in Magalang and San Fernando as sugar and rice tenants rallied for the removal of unsympathetic judges. Major strikes occurred at Mount Arayat Central and Pampanga Sugar Mill (Pasumil), while protests erupted across the province. Strikers at Mount Arayat Central consists of about 500 sugar central workers, Pasudeco at about 1,300 workers, and Pasumil in Del Carmen area at about 700 workers. These sugar workers were joined by at least 20,000 sugar and rice farmers. The unrest was notably marked by the actions of sugar workers and rice tenants, filling provincial jails despite efforts to control the violence.

==== Socialist movement ====
In late 1938, the communists, led by Crisanto Evangelista, and the US Communist party, represented by Sol Auerbach, joined to unite their parties to form the Communist Party of the Philippines (PKP), with Evangelista as chairman and Pedro Abad Santos as vice-chairman. However, members in Pampanga still identified themselves as Socialists, led by figures like Luis Taruc and Casto Alejandrino, which operated independently with their own agendas and ideologies.

The Aguman ding Maldang Talapagobra, a peasant organization established by Pedro Abad Santos in Pampanga, had generated approximately 70,000 members by 1938.

Other peasant organizations involved in Pampanga include the Kalipunang Pambansa ng mga Magsasaka sa Pilipinas (KPMP) and the Pasudeco Workers' Union. The KPMP had garnered of about 60,000 members throughout Central Luzon by 1938. Other future Hukbalahap guerrillas involved in Pampanga during the pre-WWII period include:

- Eusebio Aquino (AMT, PKP)
- Remedios Gomez (AMT)
- Silvestre Liwanag (AMT)
- Bernardo Poblete (AMT)
- Peregrino Taruc (PKP)
- Sergio Cayanan (KPMP)
- Felipa Culala (KPMP)

== Government response ==
I know that you who are gathered in this place harbor ill-feelings and have an ax to grind against the property owners in Pampanga. I do not like to behold such an ugly sight ... I have a duty to defend the rights of the property owners and likewise those of the poor ...

— Manuel Quezon, Speech in San Fernando, Pampanga, 14 February 1939 (RG 350, 1937-176; National Archives, Washington, D.C.)

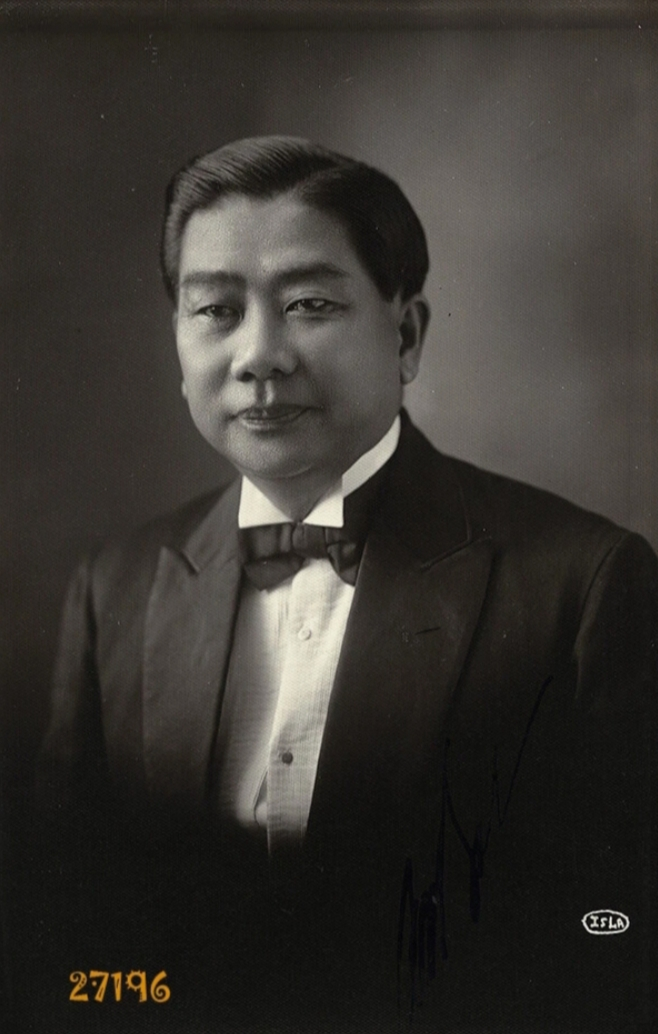
Sotero Baluyut, Pampanga governor from 1938 to 1941

By February 1939, President Manuel Quezon traveled to Pampanga in order to deescalate tensions. Quezon begged for restraint to the sugar workers and allow time for the Philippine government to address issues in the sugar industry. His request for restraint was unheeded. In 1938 and 1941, Quezon ordered the army and Philippine Constabulary to control the situation in Pampanga. Philippine government's efforts to prevent peasants from organizing included harassing activists and monitoring peasant groups. Local and national officials obstructed meetings and denied permits for peasant parades. In 1938, President Quezon expressed anger towards the mayor of Mexico, Pampanga for not halting nighttime meetings of peasant organizations. In response, the mayor cited the constitutional rights of workers. Quezon insisted that mayors must prioritize their duties over constitutional claims and urged their cooperation to suppress the "misguided laborers".

In mid-1939, Pampanga governor Sotero Baluyut created the Cawal ning Capayapan (Knights of Peace), supported by politicians, such as Asemblyman Fausto Gonzalez Sioco, and landlords, to intimidate strikers. Members, dressed in blue and white, battled dissidents for jobs and bonuses. Despite socialist protests, the government did not intervene, leading to increased violence between strikers and strikebreakers in various locations. Philippine Constabulary efforts to stop the clashes were unsuccessful. In Quezon's cabinet, many of the members were heavily anti-communist. Supreme Court judge and legal adviser to the president, Jose P. Laurel was against communism and suggested to make Secretary of Justice Jose Yulo or Secretary of Interior Rafael Alunan Sr. as his successor. Labor secretaries were also disconnected to the needs of the poor. Ramon Torres had connections to the sugar industry and Jose Avelino openly reject anything related to communism. Leon Guinto, despite suggesting social reforms to counter communism, addressed Baluyut's special army in a Loyalty Address on June 15, 1941 to "destroy the socialism that creates abuses" and praising the violence made against strikers as a "death blow to socialism."

=== Elected socialists in government ===
Benigno Layug was an effective socialist mayor in Floridablanca. As lieutenant under Pedro Abad Santos, he organized strikes among sugar workers in late 1939 and led a movement to address outstanding accounts of casamac planters. Layug gathered two thousand signatures for a petition to the president to disband the Cawals and led a march for jobless tenant families seeking land reinstatement. Selected as mayoral candidate in October 1940, he entered office with a socialist town council in January 1941 ensuring local hiring during the 1941-42 season, but the Japanese occupation soon disrupted his plans and progress.

In 1941, the national government supported Governor Sotero Baluyut's efforts to weaken the influence of Popular Front mayors in Pampanga, including the removal of some socialist mayors. Additionally, the Department of Labor and the Court of Industrial Relations deemed strikes illegal and collaborated with landlords in Central Luzon.

== Continued violence ==
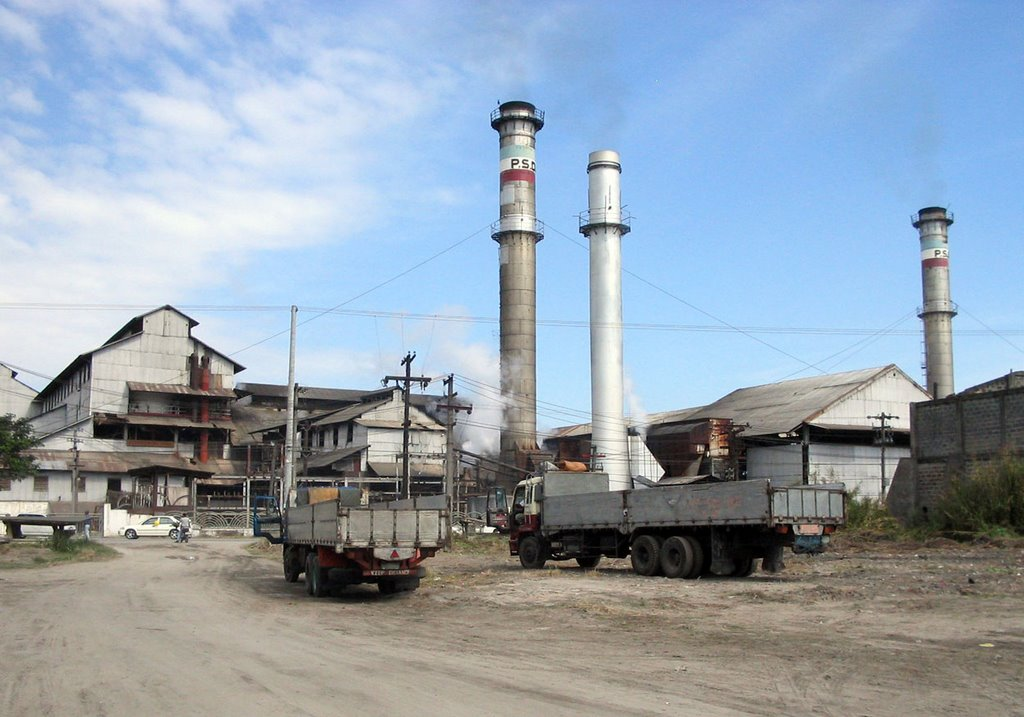
The Pasudeco Sugar Central

By early 1940, an agreement between tenants and landlords to share crops failed, leading to ongoing violence and protests. A six-month strike at Pasudeco ended favorably for strikers with socialist support. Aside from demonstrations, workers resorted to arson and murder. In Floridablanca, Kapampangan workers struck the sugar plantation owned by Secretary of Justice Jose Yulo and threatened the plantation owned by General Basilio Valdes, a Philippine army chief. Gun violence increased in Pampanga by 1939, 1940, and 1941. Several newspapers noted bloody clashes between AMT and KPMP peasant forces and the Cawals between 1939 and 1941.

Due to continued violence in 1941, credit began to disappear and lenders became worried of the unstable political climate in Pampanga. On the eve of the Japanese invasion, many of those in the sugar industry became impoverished and suffered malnutrition. As the Japanese attacked the Philippines in December 1941, many of the socialists shifted their focus in preparation of war. Despite the Japanese occupation, some peasant forces did not stop its attacks on rich landowners and businessmen. In early 1942, AMT forces assassinated Pasudeco executive Jose Tapia. Luis Taruc, a peasant leader during the Pampanga unrest, wrote that "labor struggles in Central Luzon had somewhat abated by 1941."

== Influence ==
In Luis Taruc's book Born of the People (1953), he described the efforts in rural Pampanga during the late 1930s as a "learning experience." Labor leaders learned to effectively strike, such as using a tambuli or carabao horn to gather tenants for picketing. They also figured out how to recruit members for the AMT, the party's mass action wing, and included peasant wives and children to support strikers. Taruc noted that he and others gained skills through interaction with the community. This knowledge was then taught to new students at the Socialist party's Mass School.

== Statistics ==
The table summarizes all of the total number of civil unrest reported by the newspaper The Tribune (Manila) in Pampanga.

Year	Number
Total number of reported civil unrest in Pampanga as a whole (1936 – 1941)
1936	1
1937	19
1938	36
1939	44
1940	64
1941	52

== See also ==
- Hukbalahap rebellion
- Sugar industry of the Philippines
- 1919–1922 Philippine financial crisis
