= Pedro Abad Santos =

Filipino lawyer and politician (1876–1945)

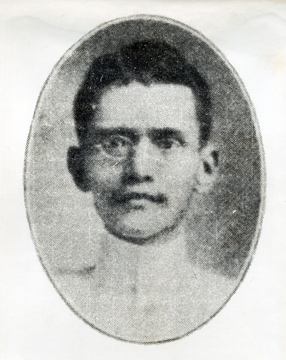

Member of the House of Representatives of the Philippine Islands from Pampanga's 2nd district
- In office October 16, 1916 – June 6, 1922
- Preceded by: Andrés Luciano
- Succeeded by: Vicente E. Manapat

Member of the San Fernando Municipal Council
- In office January 1910 – March 1912

Personal details
- Born: Pedro Abad Santos y Basco; January 31, 1876 San Fernando, Pampanga, Captaincy General of the Philippines, Spanish East Indies
- Died: January 15, 1945 (aged 68) Minalin, Pampanga, Philippine Commonwealth
- Party: Socialist/PKP-1930 (1932–1945)
- Other political affiliations: Popular Front (1937–1945); National Socialist (1935–1936); Nacionalista (1916–1932)
- Relations: José Abad Santos (brother); Vicente Abad Santos (nephew); Jamby Madrigal (grandniece); Bong Suntay (great-grandnephew)
- Education: Colegio de San Juan de Letran; University of Santo Tomas (M.D)
- Occupation: Politician
- Profession: Physician, lawyer
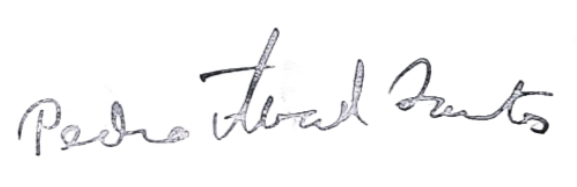
- Signature

Pedro Abad Santos y Basco (January 31, 1876 – January 15, 1945) was a Filipino Marxist politician. He founded the Socialist Party of the Philippines (transl. Partido Sosyalista ng Pilipinas) in 1932. He ran for several elections for governorship of Pampanga but never won. He also ran for president in the 1941 Philippine presidential election, but withdrew weeks before the election. Luis Taruc, who would lead the Hukbalahap, was under his tutelage and was his right-hand man.

== Early years ==
=== Early life and education ===
Pedro Abad Santos was born to a wealthy family in the town of San Fernando in Pampanga. He was the eldest of the 10 children of Vicente Abad Santos and Toribia Basco. He is a brother of José Abad Santos, who would become chief justice of the Supreme Court of the Philippines. He was also the uncle of another Vicente Abad Santos, who would become an associate justice of the Philippine Supreme Court.

Abad Santos, also referred to as Perico, completed his secondary education at the Colegio de San Juan de Letran. He later studied in the University of Santo Tomas. (Note: An article from the National Historical Commission of the Philippines claims that he studied in the University of Santo Tomas and received his Bachelor of Arts in 1891. A biography of Pedro Abad Santos claims that he studied law in the University of Santo Tomas and passed the bar in 1906. Another biography claims that he studied medicine in the University of Santo Tomas, then shifted his studies to law after his release in 1903 through a personal curriculum he created.) He also studied at the Ateneo de Manila.

=== Katipunan and Philippine-American War ===
Abad Santos joined the Katipunan in 1896 and became a major under Gen. Maximino Hizon. He was arrested and jailed for being a suspected member of the Katipunan, but was eventually released with the help of his family's influential friends. After the declaration of Philippine independence, he settled down to a teaching job in Bacolor, but was recruited by Hizon and promoted to chief of staff in 1899 for the Philippine–American War. He was eventually captured by the Americans in June 1900 and was incarcerated at an American camp in San Fernando. He was allowed to walk freely in the camp and have family visitations as he was made an official English interpreter. Toribia and her son, Jose Basco Abad Santos, traveled from the evacuation town in Angeles, Pampanga, to the San Fernando camp. They found Pedro sickly and thin in their visit.

Still, he was in trial for banditry and guerilla activities, which was punishable by death. His family hired prominent American lawyer John Haussermann to defend him during his trial. Abad Santos received a life sentence of exile in Guam, which was reduced to 25 years of imprisonment in Old Bilibid Prison in 1901. He was released in 1903 due to a general amnesty proclaimed by President Theodore Roosevelt on July 4, 1902. He arrived in the Philippines with a recurrent stomach ulcer.

== Political career ==
=== Legal career ===
In 1906, Abad Santos was admitted to the bar. From 1907 to 1909, he served as justice of the peace and as provincial fiscal in San Fernando, Pampanga. As provincial fiscal, he was also Pampanga's prosecuting attorney. He served as councilor of San Fernando from January 1910 to March 1912. From 1916 to 1922, he represented the Second District of Pampanga in the House of Representatives of the Philippine Islands for two terms. Abad Santos joined the Nacionalista Party on October 3, 1916. In his term in the House of Representatives, Abad Santos supported Manuel Quezon in a 1917 bill providing equal rights to divorce on the grounds of adultery for both sexes and a 1919 bill granting women's suffrage.

He began offering pro bono legal services when he was a municipal councilor. Around a third of his cases were composed of peasants and workers, who were subsidized by the rest of his clients, who were from prominent families. His law office was a nipa hut near the Abad Santos ancestral house.

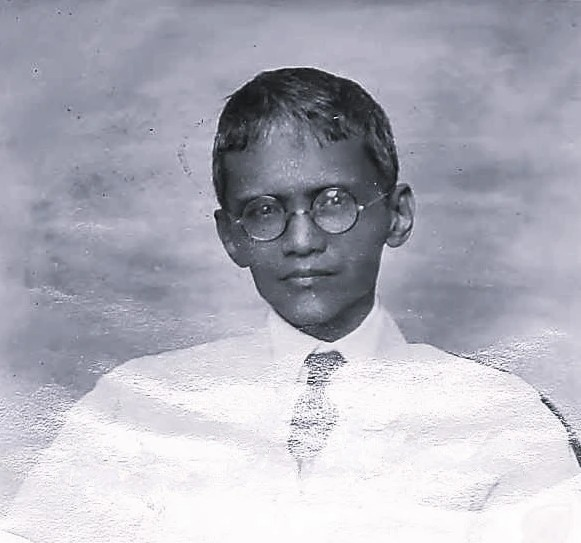
Abad Santos in 1922

He founded a private law firm with sibling Jose Abad Santos from 1920 to 1921 in Calle Azcarraga (now Recto Avenue) in Manila. The firm had the Manila Railroad Company as one of its clients. He was also included among the 28 members of the second Philippine Independence Mission to the United States in 1922, headed by Sergio Osmeña. After his return from the United States, he withdrew from insular-level politics and returned to San Fernando to offer legal services to peasants against landlords.

In 1927, Abad Santos lost the election for governor of Pampanga to Sotero Baluyut. He ran for governor of Pampanga in 1934, 1937, and 1940 afterward, all losing to Baluyut. Abad Santos joined the Popular Front in 1937. As such, he represented the Popular Front in the 1937 and 1940 elections. His votes increased from around 6,000 to 1934 to 16,000 the following election, and he lost by a margin of around 5,000 to 6,000 votes in 1940.

Abad Santos's political alliance with Quezon ceased with their conflict on the Hare–Hawes–Cutting Act, which Quezon strongly disapproved. Abad Santos supported the passing of the bill as he argued that the act's provisions could be negotiated during the ten-year Commonwealth period. During one of the debates, Quezon accused Abad Santos and Honorio Ventura, Secretary of Interior and political ally of Abad Santos, of cheating in elections.

=== Socialist Party of the Philippines ===
After his loss in the 1927 gubernatorial election, Abad Santos joined his friends Crisanto Evangelista, Antonio de Ora and Cirilo Bognot to study at the Lenin Institute in Moscow, Soviet Union.

In 1929, Abad Santos founded the Aguman ding Maldang Talapagobra (AMT), a worker's union. When the Partido Komunista ng Pilipinas (PKP) was outlawed by the Supreme Court, he founded the Socialist Party of the Philippines in 1932. (Note: There is no known exact date of the party's establishment. Several sources claim that the AMT was founded in the 1930s, or that the Socialist Party of the Philippines and the AMT were founded in 1929 or 1933. One source argues that the party was informally founded, and thus the exact establishment date is unknown. The party was spontaneously founded in 1933 according to Luis Taruc, while Abad Santos founded the party to serve as a "legal surrogate" of the PKP according to James Allen.) The base of membership of the Socialist Party of the Philippines sprung from the AMT. One of the men recruited was Luis Taruc, who became a cadre of the Socialist Party.

On November 7, 1938, during the 21st anniversary of the Russian Bolshevik Revolution, the PKP and the Socialist Party of the Philippines held a convention at the Manila Grand Opera House where they agreed to merge their organizations to form the Communist Party of the Philippines. (Note: Not to be confused with the Communist Party of the Philippines formed by Jose Maria Sison in 1968.) Crisanto Evangelista was elected the organizations' president, Abad Santos its vice president, and Guillermo Capadocia its secretary general.

Abad Santos's protégé, Luis Taruc, described him as a Marxist but not a Bolshevik. Abad Santos considered all members of the AMT as party members, and believed that the Philippines should remain its economic, political, and cultural ties with the United States with a more equitable share of wealth among classes. The PKP and the Socialist Party of the Philippines had differences in ideologies. The communists accused socialists for being "anarchistic" and "too lazy to read Marxist literature", and noted that Abad Santos would release press statements that deviated from the political line of the PKP. He was noted to be an agnostic and tolerant of his family's religious practices under Catholicism.

Sol Auerbach wrote that Abad Santos did not have a strict organization due to his inexperience in organizing and mobilizing parties. He described the party as being structureless and only composed of members who recognize Abad Santos's leadership. Taruc, in Born of the People, recalls that Abad Santos would occasionally sign memoranda or make decisions for the party without consultations.

=== Preparations for World War II ===
The Communist Party of the Philippines merger recognized the imminence of a war in Asia with Japan's expansionism, and the party discussed on its stance on independence to avoid affiliation with the United States. Abad Santos admitted to colleague Sol Auerbach that he was not sure of what to do, and wanted to "consult fellow workers first". By 1940, he was receiving reports from party members and his union of Japanese espionage. As such, he advised every town to prepare for warfare. Abad Santos wrote a letter to Douglas MacArthur requesting a supply of arms for guerrilla warfare; he received a positive response, but no supplies were given.

In June 1941, Abad Santos sent Laurence E. Salisbury, the US Foreign Service officer assigned to Sayre, a memorandum claiming that "Quezon and his men are secretly negotiating with agents of Axis governments" for their "business connections [...] with Fascists, Falangists, Japanese" and suggested that the US withdraw its patronage to Quezon and install a Popular Front government. Salisbury acknowledged the suggestion and his arguments, but noted that the offer would be impossible. In a following interview, Abad Santos requested Salisbury a channel where their positions and views would reach US officials. On July 17, Abad Santos and Evangelista called upon Sayre to express the coalition's support to the United States, and wished for "the moral support of the American authorities" when Sayre asked them any request to make of US officials. Sayre replied that he could not interfere with Commonwealth government, but acknowledged the loyalty of the party to the US.

After the bombing of Pearl Harbor, the PKP committee conducted an emergency meeting in Manila from December 8 to 11, which resulted in a memorandum published in newspapers and presented to Quezon and US high commissioner Francis Sayre. The memorandum called for an anti-Japanese united front, a communal contribution to the war effort, and pledged loyalty to democracy and to the Philippines and the US governments. He ordered Taruc on December 23 to form and mobilize a guerrilla resistance movement based on the 1941 memorandum by the PKP.

== Peasant uprising ==
In the 1930s, Filipino farmers frequently came to bloody encounters with their landlords that the government had to send several units of the Philippine Constabulary to keep the peace. The administration of President Manuel Quezon formulated a reform program that was meant to address social problems in the Philippines.

After the foundation of the AMT and the Socialist Party, Abad Santos met with peasant leaders and cadres to plan strikes and mass rallies, appeared in courts as the tenants' defense lawyers, interviews, speeches, and wrote letters and press statements on his views on topics such as religion and an impeding war against Japan. He decided to live an ascetic life in a small house at San Fernando and to never marry.

A direct confrontation occurred between Abad Santos and Quezon when Quezon agreed to speak at a mass rally in San Fernando, Pampanga in February 1939. Pedro's brother Jose, who was already Secretary of Justice, pleaded with Pedro not to embarrass Quezon when Pedro introduced the President. Pedro introduced the President as a "friend of the masses and the poor". But before Quezon spoke, Pedro enumerated farmers' grievances and criticized the legal system that, he said, landlords used against the poor. He challenged his brother, who was sitting beside Quezon, to clean up the courts and remarked that the "secretary cannot help us if he just sits in his office".

In San Fernando, Quezon pleaded to the sugar workers to restrain themselves for the violence happening in Pampanga and to gave the Philippine government time to address issues in the sugar industry. However, his request for restraint was unheeded by the laborers. After a series of government attacks on peasant parties, Abad Santos expressed his anger in a public address in 1941 declaring that "workers can expect nothing from President Quezon because he is also a landlord" and that "his so-called justice is a farce." He also labeled the people who surround President Quezon as "sycophants and henchmen who abuse the power of the Malacañang master delegates." That same year, Quezon and delegates from Central Luzon met in Manila, creating the Legion of Quezonian Socialism. The conference resolutions include the censure of Filipinos "adhering to Soviet communism" and those who criticize the Quezon administration.

== Final years and death ==
=== 1941 elections ===
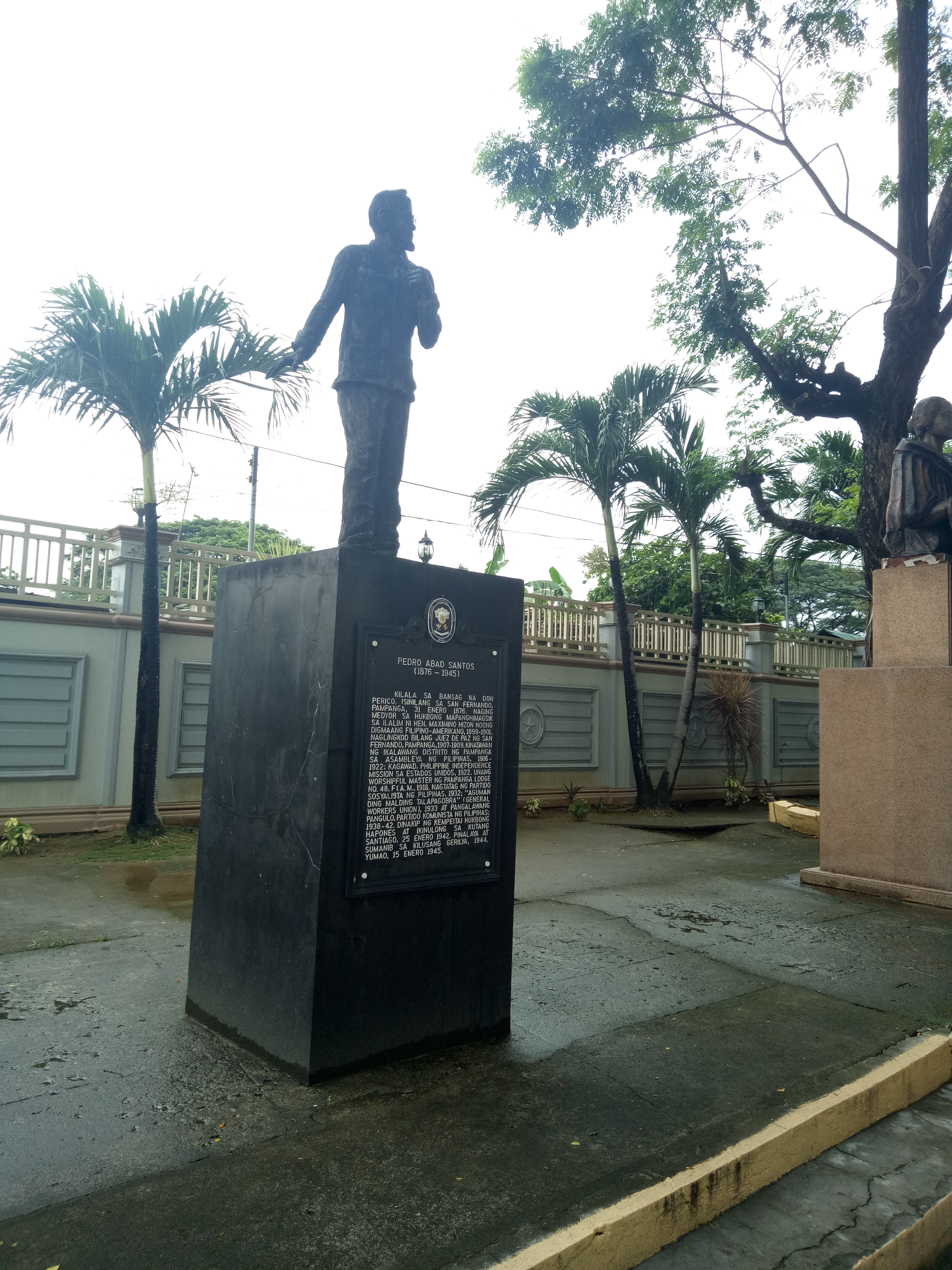
Monument of Abad Santos in San Fernando, Pampanga

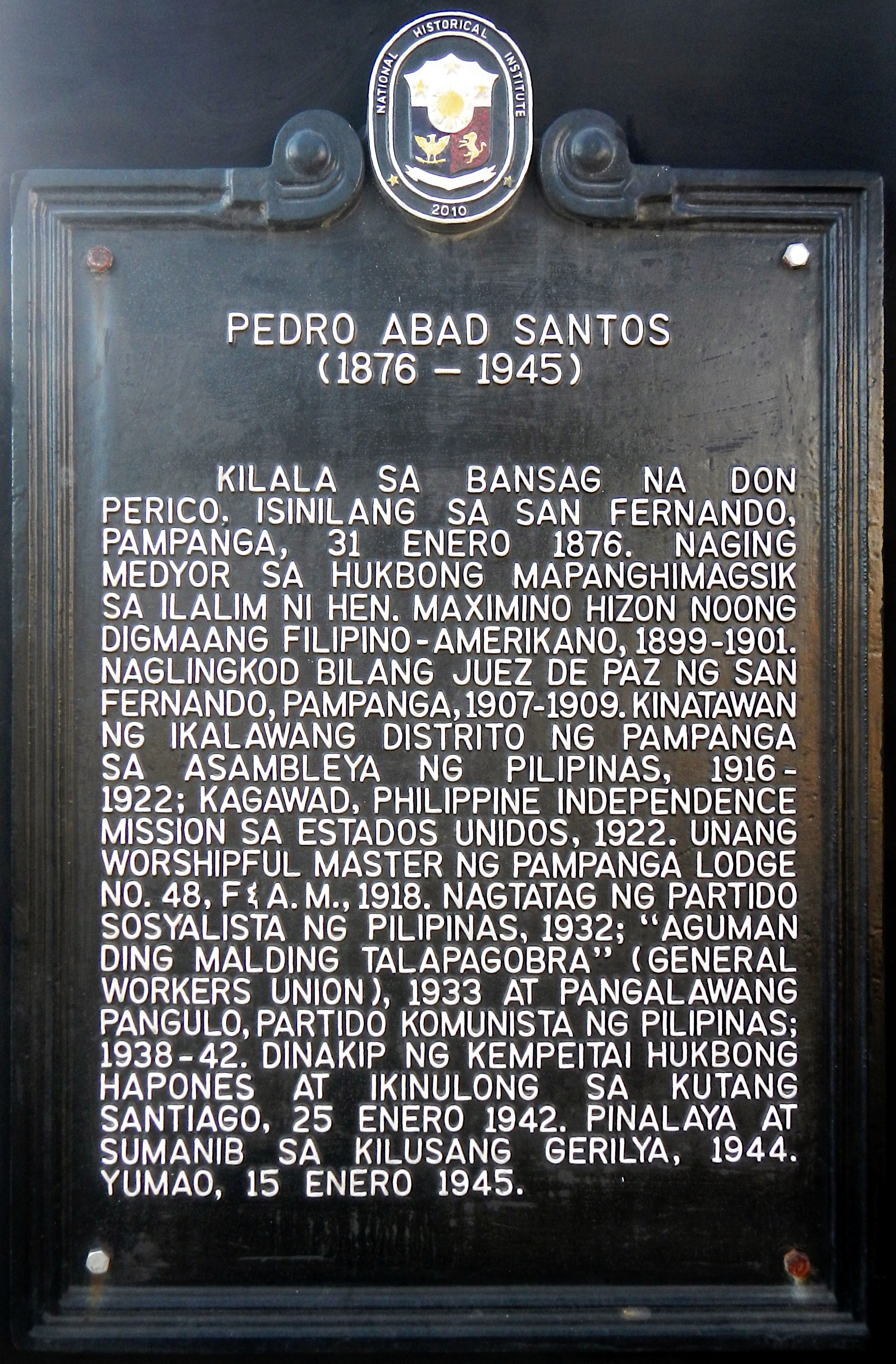
Historical marker

Prior to the 1941 Philippine presidential election, the Popular Front split into two factions: one led by Pedro Abad Santos, and another by Juan Sumulong. In 1941, Abad Santos, representing his faction of the Popular Front, filed his candidacy for presidency. Prior to the elections, His vice presidential running mate was Pilar V. Aglipay (widow of the late Bishop Gregorio Aglipay) of the Republican Party, and had a 23-man senatorial slate, among them Crisanto Evangelista, Juan Feleo, Jose Alejandrino, Jose Padilla Sr., Mateo del Castillo, and Norberto Nabong. However, Abad Santos withdrew his candidacy four weeks before the elections, citing that the Popular Front was denied the right to place election watchers.

=== Arrest and death ===
On January 25, 1942, the Japanese occupation forces arrested Pedro Abad Santos, Crisanto Evangelista, Guillermo Capadocia, and other Filipino leaders during a meeting at the Abad Santos residence compound in Ermita, Manila. He was still incarcerated at Fort Santiago when his brother Jose, who was named Chief Justice of the Supreme Court in December of the previous year, was executed by the Japanese.

Abad Santos, who was then 66 years old, would stay in prison for two years, but he was released to his family in 1944 because of a failing eyesight and stomach ailment. He remained under house arrest in the house of his niece Estrella Abad Santos in Paco, Manila. After a few months of recovery, he reported to President Jose Laurel, who refused to return him to Japanese custody. He was then sent by one of Abad Santos's assistants to a Hukbalahap base in Minalin, Pampanga, via a boat led by several AMT members from Pasig River to Pampang River. Abad Santos assisted in planning guerrilla activities during the trip.

On January 15, 1945, Abad Santos died from an acute ulcer with intestinal complications at the base. He was buried in Minalin, but his grave is not yet found.

== Legacy ==
A statue of Pedro Abad Santos was built in Heroes Hall of San Fernando, Pampanga, in 2009. A historical marker was installed the following year. City officials of San Fernando and the National Historical Commission of the Philippines have conducted wreath-laying ceremonies in honor of Abad Santos.

== See also ==
- History of the Philippines
- José Abad Santos
- 1937–1941 Pampanga peasant unrests
