= Monetary policy of the Philippines =

In the Philippines, monetary policy is the way the central bank, the Bangko Sentral ng Pilipinas, controls the supply and availability of money, the cost of money, and the rate of interest. With fiscal policy (government spending and taxes), monetary policy allows the government to influence the economy, control inflation, and stabilize currency.

== Money Supply Indicator ==
Money supply indicators are often found to contain necessary information for predicting future behavior of prices and assessing economic activity. Moreover, these are used by economists to confirm their expectations and help forecast trends in consumer price inflation. One can predict, to a certain extent, the government's intentions in regulating the economy and the consequences that result from it. For example, the government may opt to increase money supply to stimulate the economy or the government may opt to decrease money supply to control a possible mishap in the economy.

These indicators tell whether to increase or decrease the supply. Measures that include not only money but other liquid assets are called money aggregates under the name M1, M2, M3, etc.

=== M1: Narrow Money ===
M1 includes currency in circulation. It is the base measurement of the money supply and includes cash in the hands of the public, both bills and coins, plus peso demand deposits, tourists’ checks from non-bank issuers, and other checkable deposits. Basically, these are funds readily available for spending. Adjusted M1 is calculated by summing all the components mentioned above.

=== M2: Broad Money ===
This is termed broad money because M2 includes a broader set of financial assets held principally by households. This contains all of M1 plus peso saving deposits (money market deposit accounts), time deposits and balances in retail money market mutual funds.

=== M3: Broad Money Liabilities ===
Broad Money Liabilities include M2 plus money substitutes such as promissory notes and commercial papers.

=== M4: Liquidity Money ===
These include M3 plus transferable deposits, treasury bills and deposits held in foreign currency deposits. Almost all short-term, highly liquid assets will be included in this measure.

=== Implications ===
If the velocity of M1 and M2 money stock has been low, this indicates that there is a lot of money in the hands of consumers and money is not changing hands frequently.

Generally we would expect that when money supply indicators are growing faster than interest rates plus growth rate or inflation, whichever is higher, interest rates should possibly be increased. This should only generally apply when broad measures of money supply growth are higher than narrow measures, to rule out some of the measurement error issues that could emerge.

== Monetary Policy Instruments ==
=== Open Market Operations ===
Open Market Operations consist of repurchase and reverse repurchase transactions, outright transactions, and foreign exchange swaps.

- Repurchase and Reverse Repurchase

This is carried out through the Repurchase Facility and Reverse Purchase Facility of the Bangko Sentral ng Pilipinas. In Purchase transactions, the Bangko Sentral buys government securities with a dedication to sell it back at a specified future date, and at a predetermined interest rate. The BSP's payment increases reserve balances and expands the monetary supply in the Philippines. On the other hand, in Reverse Repurchase, the government acts as the seller, and works to decrease the liquidity of money. These transactions usually have maturities ranging from overnight to one month.

- Outright Transactions

Unlike the repurchase or reverse repurchase, there is no clear intent by the government to reverse the action of their selling/buying of monetary securities. Thus, this transaction creates a more permanent effect on our monetary supply. "When the BSP buys securities, it pays for them by directly crediting its counterparty's Demand Deposit Account with the BSP." The reverse is done upon the selling of securities.

- Foreign Exchange Swaps

This refers to the actual exchange of two currencies at a specific date, at a rate agreed upon the deal date and the reverse exchange of the currencies at a farther date in the future, also at an interest rate agreed on deal date.

=== Acceptance of Fixed-Term Deposits ===
To expand its liquidity management, the Bangko Sentral introduced this method in 1998. In the Special Deposits Account, or SDA, consists fixed terms deposits by banks and institutions affiliated with the BSP.

=== Standing Facilities ===
To increase the volume of credit in the financial system, the Bangko Sentra ng Pilipinas extends loans, discounts, and advances to banking institutions. "Rediscounting is a standing credit facility provided by the BSP to help banks meet temporary liquidity needs by refinancing the loans they extend to their clients." There are two types of rediscounting in the BSP: the peso rediscounting facility and the Exporter's dollar and Yen Rediscount Facility.

=== Reserve Requirements ===
In banking institutions, there are required amounts that banks cannot lend out to people. They always need to maintain a certain balance of money, which are called "reserves". Once these reserve requirements are changed and are varied, changes in the monetary supply will be observed greatly.
Two Forms:

1. Regular or Statutory Reserves
2. Liquidity Reserves

== Philippine Monetary/Currency Policy ==
=== Bangko Sentral ng Pilipinas ===
In accordance with Republic Act No. 265, The Bangko Sentral ng Pilipinas or BSP is the central monetary authority of the Republic of the Philippines. It provides policy directions in the areas of money, banking and credit and exists to supervise operations of banks and exercises regulatory powers over non-bank financial institutions. It keeps aggregate demand from growing rapidly with resulting high inflation, or from growing too slowly, resulting in high unemployment.

The primary objective of BSP's monetary policy is to promote price stability because it has the sole ability to influence the amount of money circulating in the economy. In doing so, other economic goals, such as promoting financial stability and achieving broad-based, sustainable economic growth, are given consideration in policy decision-making.

=== Philippine Monetary Framework I: 1980s to early 1990s ===
In the past, the BSP followed the monetary aggregate targeting approach to monetary policy. This approach is based on the assumption that there is a stable and predictable relationship between money, output and inflation.

In particular, all money aggregates, with the exception of reserve money, are incorporated with output and interest rate. This means that there is a long-run relationship between money on one hand and output and interest rate on the other so that even if there are shocks in the economy, the variables will return to their trend equilibrium levels.

This means that changes in money supply (on the assumption that velocity is stable over time) are directly related to price changes or to inflation. Thus, it is assumed that the BSP is able to determine the level of money supply that is needed given the desired level of inflation that is consistent with the economy's growth objective. In effect, under the monetary targeting framework, the BSP controls inflation indirectly by targeting money supply.

=== Philippine Monetary Framework II: June 1995 to Present ===
The BSP employs a modified framework beginning the second semester of 1995 in attempt to enhance the effectiveness of the monetary policy by complementing monetary aggregate targeting with some form of inflation targeting, placing greater emphasis on price stability.

Certain key modifications include:

- Allows base money levels to go beyond target as long as the inflation rates are met
- An excess of one or more percentage points of inflation over the program induces mopping up operation by the BSP to bring down base money to the previous month's level

Under an aggregate targeting framework, the BSP fixes money growth so as to minimize expected inflation. On the other hand, under the new framework, BSP sets monetary policy so that price level is not just zero in expectation but is also zero regardless of latter shocks. Moreover, the framework was changed because BSP wanted to address the fact that aggregate targeting did not account for the long-run effects of monetary policy on the economy.

With this approach, the BSP can exceed the monetary targets as long as the actual inflation rate is kept within program levels and policymakers monitor a larger set of economic variables in making decisions regarding the appropriate stance of monetary policy.

=== Current Approach: Inflation Targeting ===
As mentioned earlier, Inflation Targeting requires a public announcement of an inflation rate that a country will target for the coming years, or in a given period of time. It focuses on maintaining a low level of inflation, that which is considered to be optimal, or at least would allow the country to have ample economic growth. Its main desire is to achieve price stability as the ultimate end goal of the monetary policy. The Philippines formally adopted Inflation Targeting as the framework for Monetary Policy in January 2002.

The Philippines’ inflation target is measured through the Consumer Price Index (CPI). For 2009, inflation target has been set to be 3.5 percent, having a 1% tolerance level, and 4.5 percent for 2010, also having 1% tolerance. Also, the Monetary Board of the Philippines announced a target of around 4±1 percent from 2012 to 2014.

== Monetary Policy Issue ==
=== Exchange Rate ===
Exchange rates play a significant role in monetary transmission mechanism and at the same time, it can have a large impact on inflation rates. Although the BSP has adopted the inflation targeting approach, it may be tempted to inexplicitly target exchange rate to achieve its low inflation target. The issue here is the extent of the exchange rate pass-through or ERPT to domestic prices since higher ERPT would require the BSP to shift its attention to exchange rate movements to stabilize prices.

=== Role of Monetary Aggregates ===
Since the shift to inflation targeting, BSP has already abandoned monetary aggregates because its information content has apparently declined in the recent years. Moreover, it is also assumed that a shift of approach was necessary because money aggregates are normally not good indicators of future economic policy requirements due to unreliability of measurement.

=== Measurement of Inflation and Liquidity Trap ===
Since inflation targeting leads to lower and stable inflation rates, more improvement should then be given to the measurement of the consumer price index since few percentage points have greater repercussions when rates are low. Errors in CPI measurement could lead to ineffective and unsuitable monetary policy response by the BSP which definitely result to detrimental effects to the economy.

Another issue arising from monetary policies is the liquidity trap. This happens when inflation rate declines too much leading to a threat of deflation. Liquidity trap is defined as a situation in which there are zero nominal interest rates, persistent deflation and deflation expectations. In the event this occurs, bonds and money earn the same real rate of return thus making people indifferent to holding bonds or excess money.

=== Budget Deficit and External Debts ===
Given high budget deficits, the government is concerned about two closely related issues: it does not want to pay very high interest on its borrowings and it does not want to crowd out the market. Ideally, the government could raise tax revenues to avoid borrowing huge sums from the market. However, the government opted to borrow from the international capital market and though rates are low, these have shorter maturity and country's outstanding external debt has continued to move towards a less ideal position.

=== Fiscal Dominance ===
According to the fiscal theory of the price level, it is not the non-interest bearing money but the total nominal liabilities including interest bearing notes and future fiscal surpluses that matter for price-level determination. In the absence of fiscal discipline, an independent central bank such as the BSP cannot guarantee a stable nominal anchor. In other words, for the BSP to successfully focus on price stability, there must be a credible commitment on the part of the National Government to reduce total fiscal deficits by a meaningful amount.
