= 1919 Philippine rice crisis =

The Philippines was affected by a rice crisis from 1919 to 1921 that swept across Southeast Asia.

== Government response ==
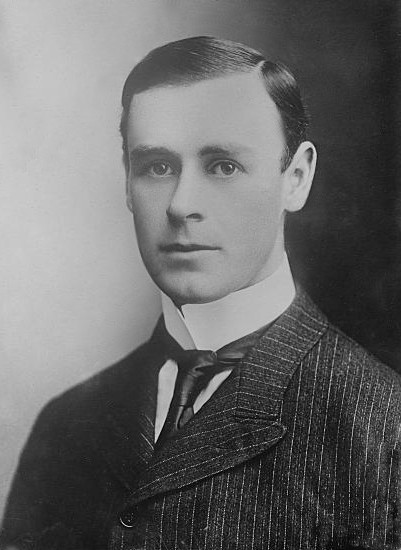
Governor-General Francis Burton Harrison

In July 1919, the Philippine government tried to distribute rice at a low price in Manila to mitigate soaring rice prices. In August 1919, the Manila Merchants' Association, composed of non-Chinese Filipino merchants, blamed the rice crisis on landlords. On April 2, 1920, Samuel Ferguson, president of the PNB, informed Governor General Francis Burton Harrison about rising rice prices due to speculation. Rice millers struggled to buy palay at a fair price, leading to higher costs for consumers. By late 1920, rice imports increased, and wholesale prices in Manila began to decrease. The crisis also exacerbated sinophobia against Chinese merchants.

== Recovery ==
Importations per capita of rice
Year	Value (in Php(₱))	Importations per capita (in Php(₱))
1919	8,817,362	0.84
1920	16,329,770	1.51
1921	6,649,393	0.60
1922	4,604,315	0.41

In early 1921, prices drop significantly from P14.00 per cavan in 1920 to P7.56 per cavan in 1921. Due to a good local rice harvest in 1921, concerns for local producers arose which prompted the Philippine Legislature to give the governor-general the power to prohibit rice imports. Importation was banned twice in that year.

In 1920, the Philippine government proposed to raise the rice import tariff from P2.40 to P4.00 per 100 kilos to boost revenue. Although initially rejected, it was eventually set at P3.00 in 1922 to help producers. This tariff increase occurred after inflation ended in 1920. The rise in prices affected consumers, but the situation was mitigated by the increased local production from Nueva Ecija.

== Impact ==
Due to the rice crisis, rice growers in Central Luzon pressured the sugar landlords to support the protective tariff and the ban on Chinese migrants in the Philippine Legislature in 1920.

Filipino rice landlords used the rice crisis as leverage to strengthen their influence in the Philippine government. The crisis also led to mass starvation among the Filipino populace.

=== Pampanga ===
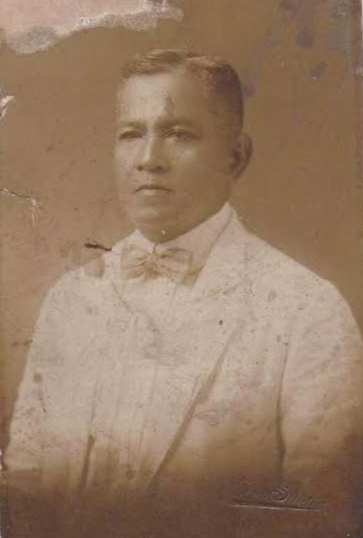
Don Olimpio Guanzon, Governor of Pampanga from 1922 to 1925

Pampanga's rice casamac experienced unrest starting in early 1921 with the burning of rice stocks in Candaba. The Bureau of Labor handled multiple agricultural disputes, while Governor Olimpio Guanzon attempted to create a conflict resolution system in 1924. The conflicts in Pampanga between rice peasants and landlords also spread as far as Tarlac during the 1920s. Soon, the rice peasants formed a group called Anak Pawas (which translated from Kapampangan as the "Sons of Sweat"), and violence continued into the 1930s across various towns in Central Luzon.

In 1935, another rice crisis would emerge fueled by the Great Depression. By the mid-1930s, the sugar peasants soon joined the rice peasants in the labor movement.

== See also ==
- 1919–1922 Philippine financial crisis
- Great Depression in the Philippines
- Rice riots of 1918 – riots in Japan resulting from rice shortages
