= Sotero Baluyut =

Filipino civil engineer and politician

The Honorable Sotero Baluyut
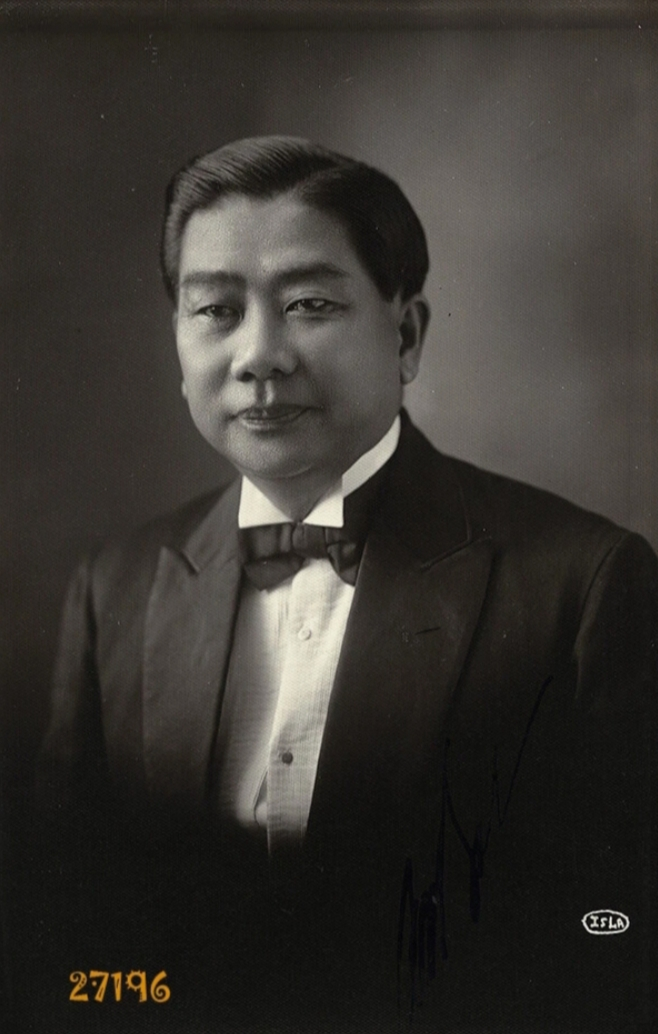
- Baluyut, c. 1930s

Secretary of Public Works and Communications
- In office January 6, 1951 – 1952
- President: Elpidio Quirino
- Preceded by: Prospero Sanidad
- Succeeded by: Pablo Lorenzo
- In office 1941–1941
- President: Manuel L. Quezon
- Preceded by: Jose Avelino
- Succeeded by: Basilio Valdes

21st Secretary of the Interior
- In office September 21, 1948 – December 22, 1950
- President: Elpidio Quirino
- Preceded by: Jose Zulueta
- Succeeded by: Position abolished

12th and 15th Governor of Pampanga
- In office 1925–1931
- Preceded by: Olimpio Guanzon
- Succeeded by: Eligio Lagman
- In office 1938–1941
- Preceded by: Pablo Ángeles David
- Succeeded by: Fausto González Sioco

Senator of the Philippines from the 3rd Senatorial District
- In office June 2, 1931 – September 16, 1935 Serving with Benigno Aquino Sr. (1931–1934) and Hermogenes Concepcion (1934–1935)
- Preceded by: Teodoro Sandiko
- Succeeded by: Position abolished

Personal details
- Born: Sotero Baluyut y Julao; January 3, 1889 San Fernando, Pampanga, Captaincy General of the Philippines
- Died: January 6, 1975 (aged 86) Ermita, Manila, Philippines
- Party: Nacionalista (1925–1975)
- Spouse(s): Encarnacion Lopez; Maria Lopez
- Children: 2
- Education: University Summer Schools of Illinois; University of Iowa
- Occupation: Politician
- Profession: Civil engineer

Sotero Julao Baluyut (born Sotero Baluyut y Julao; January 3, 1889 – January 6, 1975), also known as Sotero Baluyot, was a Filipino politician and civil engineer. He served as Governor of Pampanga from 1925 to 1931 and 1938 to 1941, Secretary of Public Works and the Interior and Senator of the Philippines from 1931 to 1935. Due to his role during the Pampanga unrests in the 1930s and early 1940s, he was perceived as one of the "arch enemies" of the peasantry.

== Early life, education, and career ==
Sotero Baluyut was born on January 3, 1889, in San Fernando, Pampanga. His parents were Leoncio Baluyut and Casimira Julao. In 1904, Baluyut was given the opportunity to study at the expense of the government in the United States. After he studied in Santa Ana Central and High School in California and the University Summer School of Illinois, he obtained a bachelor's degree in Civil Engineering from the University of Iowa.

In 1911, Baluyut returned to the Philippines, where he went to work for the Office of Public Works as an assistant engineer in the provinces of Pampanga and Cavite. Afterwards, from 1912 to 1919, he was district engineer for the provinces of Isabela, Antique, Ilocos Norte, Bulacan and Pangasinan. He also worked on the San Jose-Santa Fe Road. In 1920, he became an engineer for the Pampanga Sugar Development Company (Pasudeco).

== Political career ==
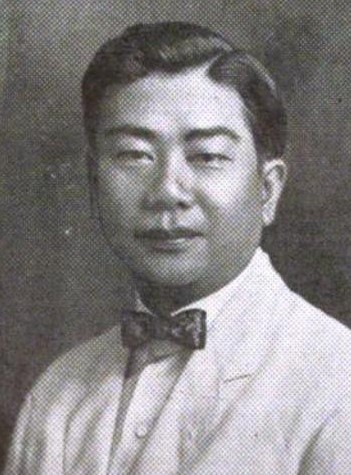
Senatorial portrait of Baluyut, published by Benipayo Press, c. 1935

In 1925, Baluyut was elected governor of the province of Pampanga. He was re-elected three years later. During his term of six years as governor, he was responsible for the construction of many schools, hospitals, roads and bridges. One of the larger projects that was realized in his term was a long paved road straight through the province. Baluyut founded the Cawal ning Capayapan (Knights of Peace), in response to the peasant violence throughout the province in the 1930s and early 1940s. According to him in 1940, the Cawals were composed of 14,000 members who "pledged not to use violence, and never to strike without the approval or sanction of the government, and above all never to resort to sabotage." The violence in Pampanga became so severe that President Manuel L. Quezon ordered the army and Philippine Constabulary to control the situation. Baluyut was considered a foe of the Aguman ding Maldang Talapagobra (AMT) and similar peasant organizations operating in the province.

After his second term, Baluyut was elected in 1931 and re-elected in 1934 as a member of Senate from 3rd Senatorial District. In the Senate, among other things, he enacted the law which led to the establishment of National Electric Power and Development Corporation. At the end of 1937, Baluyut was elected governor of the province of Pampanga for a third term. He was appointed as secretary of public works while serving as governor in 1941. He became Secretary of Public Works and Communications from 1951 to 1952.

== Personal life ==
He was married to Encarnacion Lopez and had a son with her. He has also daughter with Maria Lopez.

== Death ==
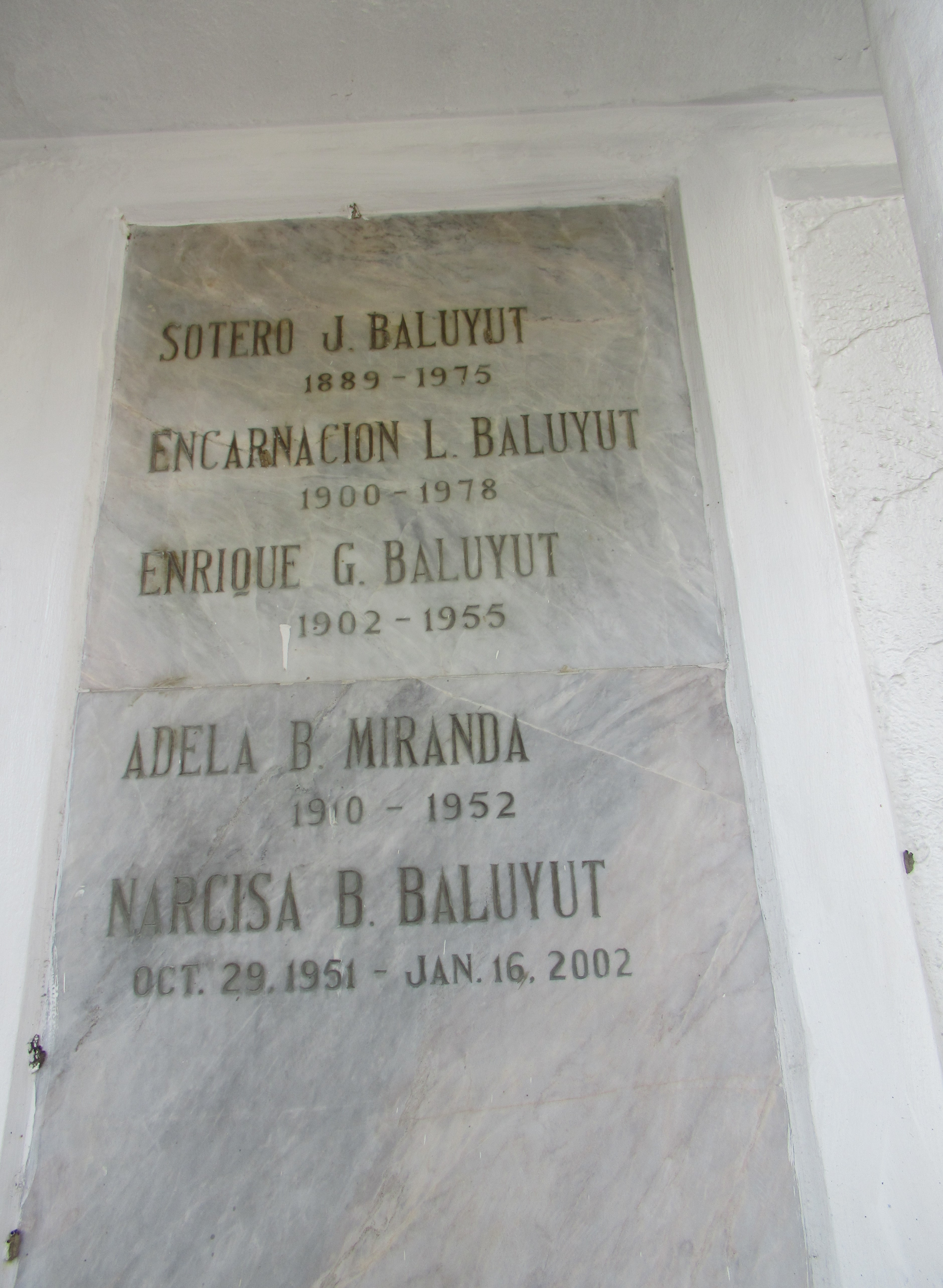
Baluyut tomb

Baluyut died at The Medical Center in Ermita, Manila on January 6, 1975, at the age of 86.
