= Pampanga Sugar Development Company =

Sugar company in the Philippines

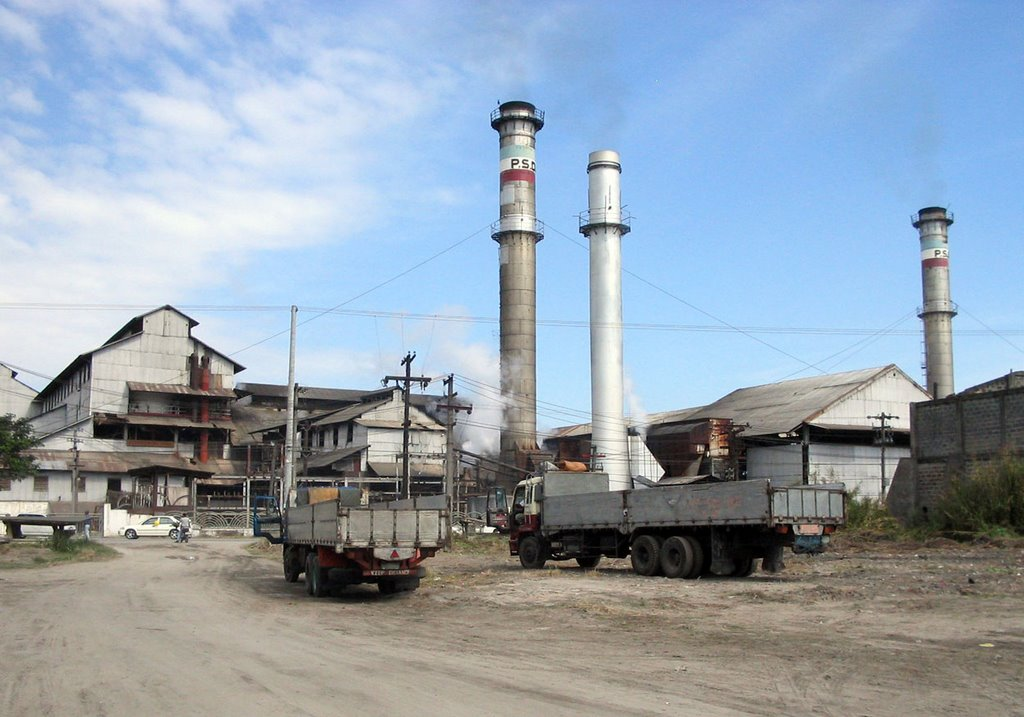
Pasudeco Sugar Central

The Pampanga Sugar Development Company built the first Filipino-financed sugar central in Pampanga, Philippines. It was established in 1921 by several local families in Pampanga. It is the oldest running mill in the province.

== History ==
The Pasudeco Sugar Central was finished in March, 1921, to serve as a central purchasing and processing company for the surrounding sugar plantations. Financed by the Pampanga Sugar Development Company, it was constructed by the Honolulu Iron Works. Its existence became a catalyst for the exponential growth of San Fernando, the capital of the rich sugar-producing province of Pampanga.

On July 12, 1939, two of the founders, Jose de Leon and Augusto Gonzalez, as well as Constabulary Captain Julian Olivas, were gunned down at the administrative offices of Pasudeco. At that time, De Leon and Gonzalez were the two richest men in Pampanga and the biggest Pasudeco shareholders. This was during a period of conflict between sugar hacenderos and sugar millers in terms of participation. Both De Leon and Gonzalez made Pasudeco the most successful and progressively operated sugar central in the Philippines, with possessed fortunes of ₱2.5 million and ₱1.3–1.5 million respectively at the time of their deaths. The killing of De Leon and Gonzalez was the most dramatic event in the sugar planter-miller struggle during the Great Depression in San Fernando.

Despite the Japanese invasion in 1941, some peasant farmers did not stop its attacks on landowners. Peasant forces from Aguman ding Maldang Talapagobra (AMT) assassinated Pasudeco executive Jose Tapia in 1942.

The 30-meter-high 1964 Chimney 3 was transferred to Capital Town gate in July 2022. Chimneys 1 and 2 at 45.73 meter each, which were made from 1918 to 1922 will be rebuilt by Megaworld and relocated to Capital Mall. Capital Town is a 35.6 hectares (88 acres) development in San Fernando, Pampanga, standing in PASUDECO site. It features the 17-story Saint-Marcel Residences, with 361 "smart home" units - Chelsea Parkplace condominium named after Chelsea, New York

== See also ==
- 1937–1941 Pampanga peasant unrests
- Sugar industry of the Philippines
