= Great Depression in the Philippines =

The Great Depression in the Philippines was a result of the impact of the economic downturn happening in the United States from 1929 to 1939. Being a colony of the US, the Philippines experienced falling prices of its key agricultural products and a rice crisis, causing peasant violence throughout the islands.

== Overview ==
The impact of the 1930s depression in the Philippines varied by region and social class. Overall, the Philippines suffered less than its neighboring countries, with high consumption levels from 1934 to 1938. However, the crisis affected agricultural prices differently across regions.

The economic decline in advanced economies influenced tropical colonies through reduced trade, price changes favoring advanced countries, decreased capital flows, and falling world prices. The Philippines experienced these issues but less severely due to its status as a US colony, which allowed some exports, like sugar, to maintain volumes and prices.

== 1935 rice crisis ==
In the 1920s, Philippine rice production increased due to more land being cultivated, leading to the lifting of the rice export ban in 1927. However, the Great Depression starting in 1929 caused rice prices to drop, prompting the government to raise import tariffs on rice in 1931 to support local farmers. By the early 1930s, unemployment grew in Manila, and more people became agricultural laborers in the countryside, leading to widespread starvation and a rise in the peasant movement, particularly in Central Luzon and Southern Tagalog.

During a rice crisis in 1935, rice prices in Manila surged, peaking at ₱7.61 per cavan in November. While this increase was less than during the 1919 crisis, the effects on the population were significant because other goods had lower prices, and the social structure changed. In the Visayas and Bicol regions, rising rice prices worsened social issues amid ongoing economic depression and high unemployment. Municipal governments faced pressure to provide free food, and in Central Luzon, people protested for affordable rice prices and to end the social unrest caused by robbery incidents.

== Sugar industry ==
Sugar cane was another significant cash crop, expanding from 72,000 hectares in 1910 to 306,000 hectares in 1934. Pampanga and Tarlac held a substantial amount of the sugar land and built modern facilities for sugar milling during the 1920s and 1930s.

=== Anti-competitive behaviors ===
As the sugar market declined due to the Great Depression, leadership opportunities in the industry became fewer. Investors engaged in various activities, including buying and selling plantations, sugar futures, and shares. A diversified investment approach, including nonsugar assets, was essential, but it involved significant risks, especially during changes in the market. With slow sales in the sugar industry, businesses focused on acquiring others to increase market share, leading to some consolidation. In 1935 and early 1936, four sugar centrals changed ownership. The Bataan Sugar Company and Ormoc Sugar Company were acquired by Gil Montilla's family. The Lopez Sugar Central bought Central Santos-Lopez, and the Bacolod Sugar Central changed hands to the Lizares family, an influential sugar hacendero family in Negros. While the first three acquisitions had small quotas, Bacolod Central significantly contributed almost 10 percent of the Philippine sugar export quota. By 1937, seven families or corporations controlled two-thirds of sugar milling, though other takeover efforts were unsuccessful.

=== Government response ===
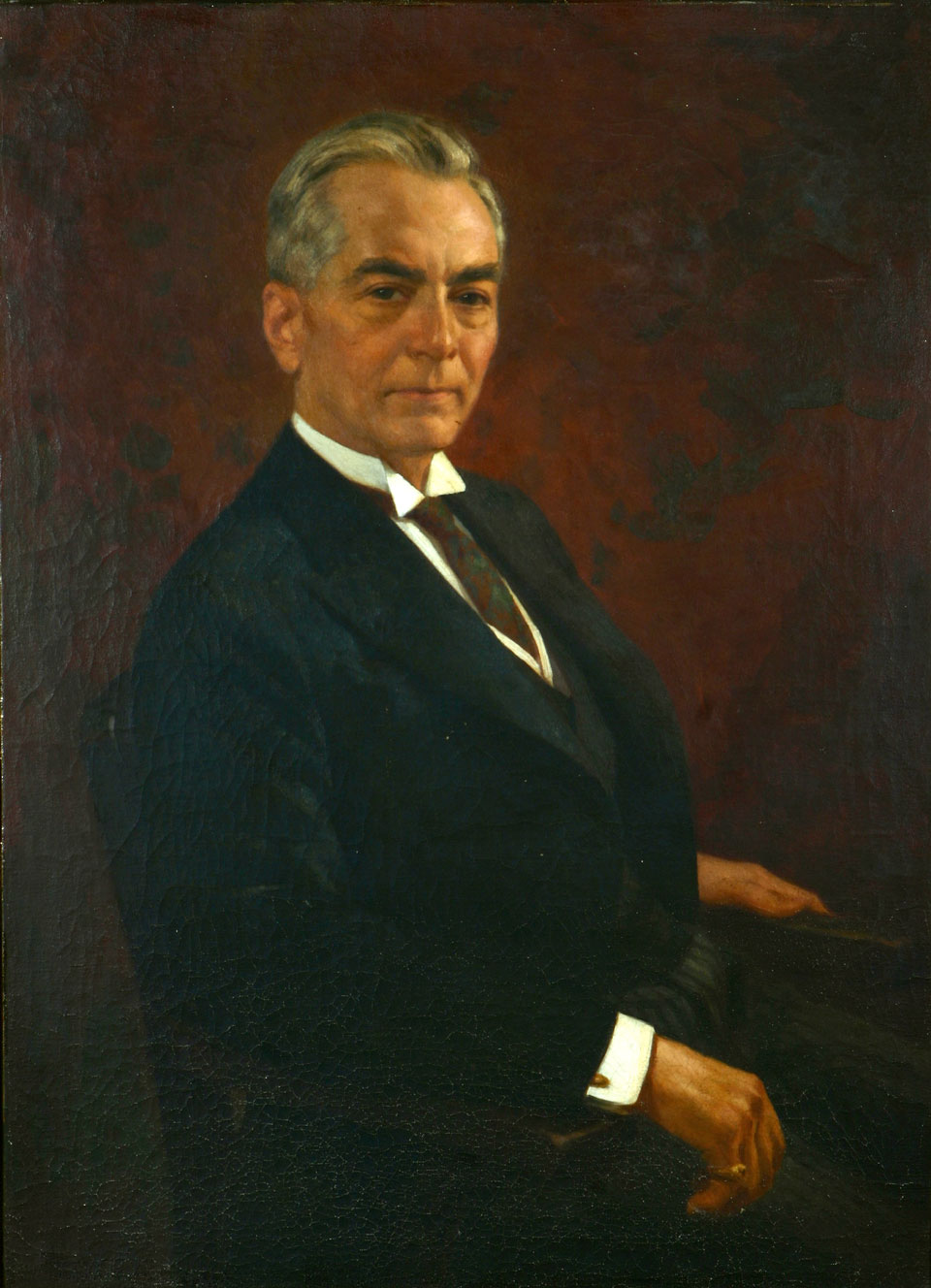
Official Malacañang portrait of Philippine Commonwealth President Manuel Quezon

Philippine Commonwealth President Manuel Quezon influenced the Philippine National Bank's decisions to support the sugar industry. The bank helped struggling hacenderos by offering mortgages on reserve sugar, low-interest loans, and cash for tenants' crops as it did in large numbers in 1937. It also discouraged planters from investing in mining stocks. This helped keep farmers in business and loyal to President Quezon.

The Tydings-McDuffie and US Sugar Acts of 1934 and 1937 shaped the political and economic relationship between the Philippines and the United States, with significant focus on protecting Philippine sugar interests. President Quezon led efforts to address various challenges related to sugar through representatives like Resident Commissioner Joaquin Miguel Elizalde and Felipe Buencamino.

== Social inequality ==
Large landowners benefited from the rice and sugar boom, while peasants struggled to meet their basic needs despite being the ones who produced the crops during the 1920s and 1930s.

During the 1930s, sugar barons in Negros continue to live extravagantly, with gatherings at Negros's University Club for the Negrense "four hundred" and festive balls in rural areas. Bacolod remained popular among wealthy planters, becoming an incorporated city in 1938 with a new capitol built at a cost of ₱1 million and a new pier to increase boat traffic. In Pampanga, townsfolk engaged in various dances, receptions, and meetings held by local groups like the Limbagan Club (San Fernando), Sociedad Pampangueña, and the Mountain Side Club (Magalang). The most highlighted event of the province during the 1930s was the Mancomunidad Pampangueña's annual ball which gained attention among the distinguished guest from the Visayas.

=== Peasant uprisings ===
The economic downturn affected laborers and peasant farmers the most. From 1903 to 1939, Philippine population increased from 7 million to 16 million. By the 1930s, peasants needed land desperately, relying mostly on landowners for farming. If forced to leave, tenants struggled to find new landowners. Consequently, landowners increased demands and threatened to replace tenants who disagreed. Another major concern during the 1930s was the amount of layoffs of agricultural workers and meager wages following the decline of prices among agricultural products, particularly sugar. The rice crisis which emerged in the 1930s caused social unrest.

Major peasant uprisings occurred in the 1930s such as the Tayug uprising (1931), the Sakdalista (principally 1934 to 1935), and the Tangulan incidents (principally 1931). In May 1935 in Manila, more than 6,000 landless peasant farmers gathered at government buildings in protest of the poor economic conditions, however, were met with gunfire from authorities. The bloody clashes between authorities and farmers resulted in more than 100 deaths.

=== Government legislation and actions ===
==== Governorship of Frank Murphy ====
During the administration of Governor-General Frank Murphy, some landowners formed vigilante groups to crush peasant unrests and even directed their allies in the Philippine Legislature to oppose measures to address the concerns of the peasantry.

As peasant unrests occurred in the Philippines during his tenure, Murphy expressed that he did not sufficiently address the income inequality in the Philippines. One of his last official acts as governor-general was to release many of the arrested peasant rebels in 1935 due to concerns of harsh conditions.

==== Presidency of Manuel Quezon ====
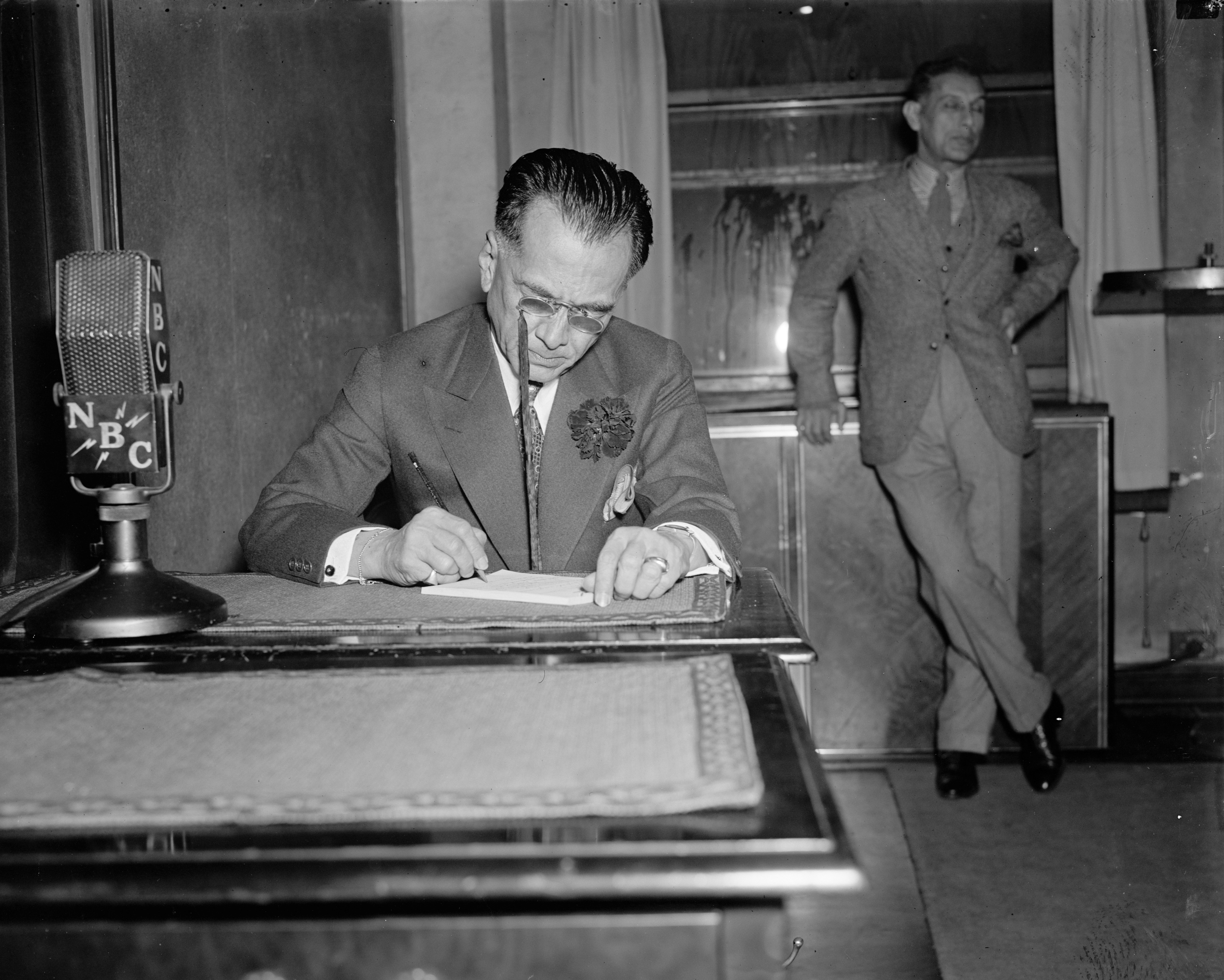
President Manuel Quezon in 1937

President Quezon's dedication to social justice was unclear. Three major studies from the Department of Labor (1936), the National Sugar Board (1939), and the Institute of Pacific Relations (1939) highlighted the poor working conditions and low wages in the Philippines, especially in the sugar industry. However, laws like the eight-hour workday and the Sugar Tenancy Act (Act No. 4113) were weak and hard to enforce. The 1936 Department of Labor Report criticized the tenancy law as "absolutely inadequate" for not clarifying the roles and relationships between tenants and landowners. Social justice served more to divert criticism from the president than to help the poor.

While vetoing one such measure benefiting farmhands than landlords in 1941, Quezon wrote:

Act No. 4054 [Rice Share Tenancy Act] of the Philippine Legislature was intended to prevent the tenants from being exploited by the landowners through certain old practices . . . but it has never been the intention of the legislature in enacting these laws to deprive the landowner of his right of ownership which includes his right to cultivate the land and plant it with such crop as he may think necessary or convenient or profitable, or use the land for other purposes.

— Veto Message of Manuel Quezon to the Members of the National Assembly, June 21, 1941, QP

Another factor that hinder Quezon's "social justice" program was the unwillingness or lack of support thereof from the National Assembly. During his term as president, he also banned labor strikes and various "unwholesome agitations" conducted by peasant rebels.

== Other economic issues ==
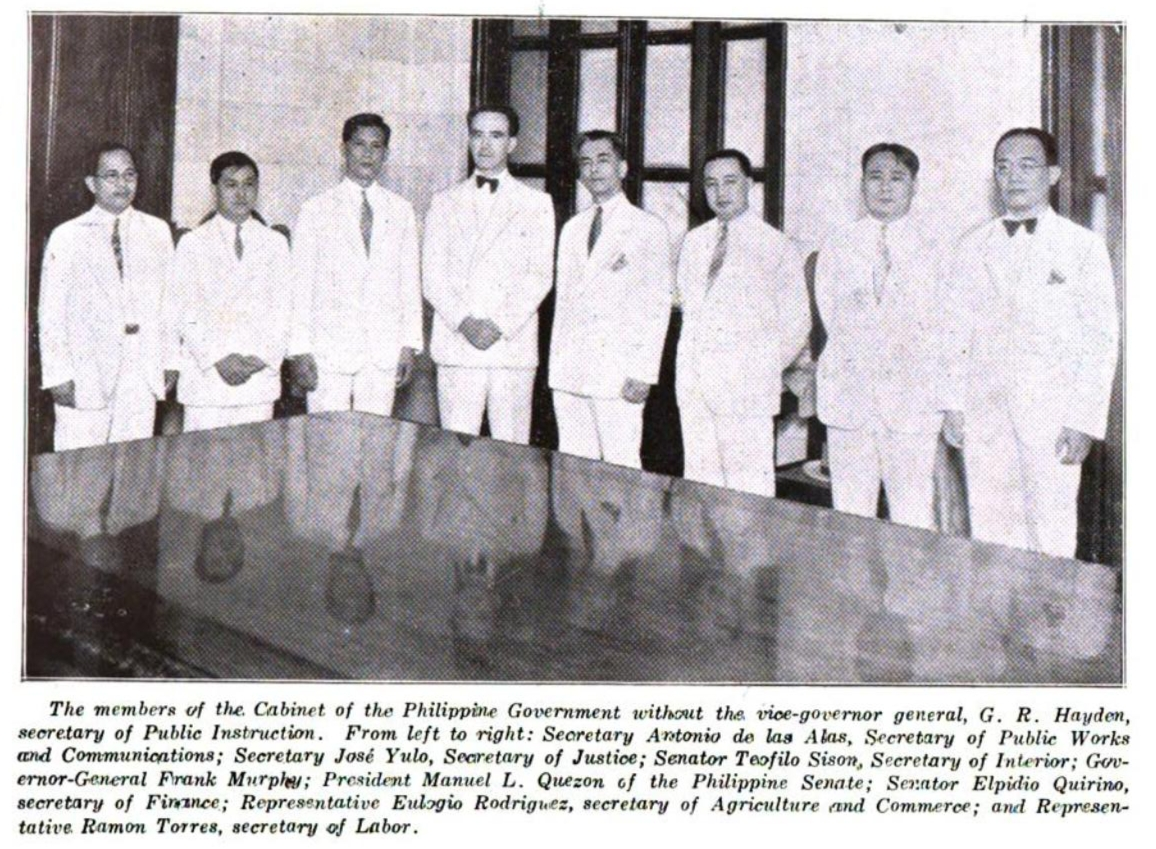
Governor-General Frank Murphy with his Philippine cabinet, c. 1935

The lack of tariff and currency autonomy significantly hindered the Philippines' ability to adjust its economy, particularly in the textile industry. Due to Japanese textiles dominating the Philippine market in the 1930s, American producers faced unfair competition despite high tariffs of roughly 105 percent imposed on Japanese products. The United States restricted the Philippines from raising tariffs further, fearing negative impacts on American cotton exports to Japan.

In 1933, the Philippine Assembly enacted a law allowing the American governor general to modify tariffs based on recommendations from a tariff commission. This law mirrored a US law empowering the US President to adjust tariffs on cheaper imports. However, US officials opposed the Philippine law, citing the country's lack of manufacturing capacity as a reason it was deemed unconstitutional. There was no domestic industry in the Philippines to inform tariff rates. Efforts to manage currency value also failed. In 1934, the acting secretary of Finance Vicente Singson Encarnacion proposed a plan for economic development, including a central bank and independent currency, but the governor-general did not approve it. It took 15 years and an approaching balance of payments crisis for the Philippines to finally establish a central bank.

=== Dependency on the United States ===
The Philippines faced US restrictions on exports and lacked control over foreign trade, preventing the implementation of economic strategies like Export Oriented Industrialization (EOI) or Import Substituting Industrialization (ISI). This led to increased dependency on the United States and worsened underdevelopment. During the Philippine Commonwealth period, US trade share rose from 65% in 1933 to 78% in 1940, and the country shifted from trade surplus to deficit.

== See also ==
- 1937–1941 Pampanga peasant unrests
