= Aguman ding Maldang Talapagobra =

Trade union in the Philippines

League of Poor Laborers
- Aguman ding Maldang Talapagobra
- Predecessor: Aguman ding Talapagobra ning Pilipinas
- Founded: 1933
- Founder: Pedro Abad Santos
- Location: Philippines
- Members: approximately 70,000 (1938)
- Affiliations: Socialist Party of the Philippines

The Aguman ding Maldang Talapagobra (AMT) (Kapampangan, League of Poor Laborers or League of Poor Workers) was a trade union in Pampanga, Philippines, organized by Pedro Abad Santos in 1933. It was influenced by European socialism and anarchism, functioned as a mutual aid association, and participated in electoral politics.

== Activities ==
The AMT was supported by the Partido Sosyalista ng Pilipinas (Socialist Party of the Philippines), a socialist party established by Abad Santos when the Partido Komunista ng Pilipinas (Communist Party of the Philippines) was outlawed in 1932. The AMT employed strike actions and mass demonstrations against landowners.

There were occasions during the 1930s when members of the AMT were found dead, having been killed by security personnel of the sugar centrals or private armies of landowners. The AMT had an estimated 70,000 members by 1938, one of the largest peasant organizations in Central Luzon alongside the Kalipunang Pambansa ng mga Magsasaka sa Pilipinas (KPMP). The AMT was also involved in assassinations of high-profile landlords and businessmen. In early 1942, for instance, AMT peasant forces assassinated Pasudeco executive Jose Tapia. It was reported by several newspapers that the AMT had been engaged in armed conflict with Pampanga governor Sotero Baluyut's private army, Cawal ning Capayapan or simply called the Cawals, between 1939 and 1941.
