= Fiscal policy of the Philippines =

Fiscal policy are "measures employed by governments to stabilize the economy, specifically by manipulating the levels and allocations of taxes and government expenditures". In the Philippines, this is characterized by continuous and increasing levels of debt and budget deficits, though there were improvements in the last few years of the first decade of the 21st century.

The Philippine government's main source of revenue are taxes, with some non-tax revenue also being collected. To finance fiscal deficit and debt, the Philippines relies on both domestic and external sources.

Fiscal policy during the Marcos administration was primarily focused on indirect tax collection and on government spending on economic services and infrastructure development. The first Aquino administration inherited a large fiscal deficit from the previous administration, but managed to reduce fiscal imbalance and improve tax collection through the introduction of the 1986 Tax Reform Program and the value added tax. The Ramos administration experienced budget surpluses due to substantial gains from the massive sale of government assets and strong foreign investment iyears and administrations. The Estrada administration faced a large fiscal deficit due to the decrease in tax effort and the repayment of the Ramos administration's debt to contractors and suppliers. During the Arroyo administration, the Expanded Value Added Tax Law was enacted, national debt-to-GDP ratio peaked, and underspending on public infrastructure and other capital expenditures was observed.

== Revenues and funding ==
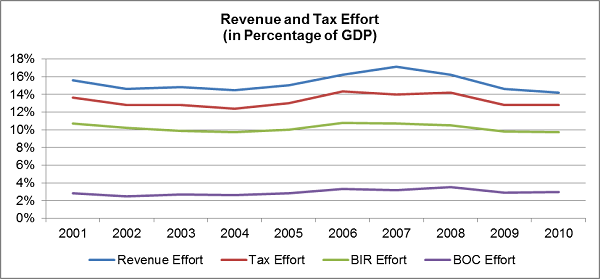
A comparative graph of Revenue and Tax Effort from 2001 to 2010

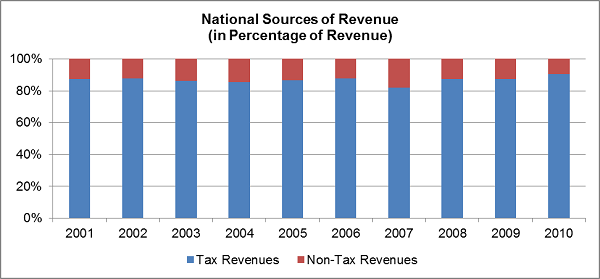
A comparative graph of Tax and Non-Tax Revenue contribution from 2001 to 2010

The Philippine government generates revenues mainly through personal and income tax collection, but a small portion of non-tax revenue is also collected through fees and licenses, privatization proceeds and income from other government operations and state-owned enterprises.

=== Tax revenue ===
Tax collections comprise the biggest percentage of revenue collected. Its biggest contributor is the Bureau of Internal Revenue (BIR), followed by the Bureau of Customs (BOC). Tax effort as a percentage of GDP has averaged at roughly 13% for the years 2001–2010.

==== Income taxes ====
Income tax is a tax on a person's income, wages, profits arising from property, practice of profession, conduct of trade or business or any stipulated in the National Internal Revenue Code of 1997 (NIRC), less any deductions granted. Income tax in the Philippines is a progressive tax, as people with higher incomes pay more than people with lower incomes. Personal income tax rates vary as such:

Annual Taxable Income	Income Tax Rate
Less than ₱10,000	5%
Over ₱10,000 but not over ₱30,000	₱500 + 10% of the excess over ₱10,000
Over ₱30,000 but not over ₱70,000	₱2,500 + 15% of the excess over ₱30,000
Over ₱70,000 but not over ₱140,000	₱8,500 + 20% of the excess over ₱70,000
Over ₱140,000 but not over ₱250,000	₱22,500 + 25% of the excess over ₱140,000
Over ₱250,000 but not over ₱500,000	₱50,000 + 30% of the excess over ₱250,000
Over ₱500,000	₱125,000 + 32% of the excess over ₱500,000

The top rate was 35% until 1997, 34% in 1998, 33% in 1999, and 32% since 2000.

In 2008, Republic Act No. 9504 (passed by then-President Gloria Macapagal Arroyo) exempted minimum wage earners from paying income taxes.

==== E-VAT ====
The Expanded Value Added Tax (E-VAT), is a form of sales tax that is imposed on the sale of goods and services and on the import of goods into the Philippines. It is a consumption tax (those who consume more are taxed more) and an indirect tax, which can be passed on to the buyer. The current E-VAT rate is 12% of transactions. Some items which are subject to E-VAT include petroleum, natural gases, indigenous fuels, coals, medical services, legal services, electricity, non-basic commodities, clothing, non-food agricultural products, domestic travel by air and sea.

The E-VAT has exemptions which include basic commodities and socially sensitive products. Exemptible from the E-VAT are:

1. Agricultural and marine products in their original state (e.g. vegetables, meat, fish, fruits, eggs and rice), including those which have undergone preservation processes (e.g. freezing, drying, salting, broiling, roasting, smoking or stripping);
2. Educational services rendered by both public and private educational institutions;
3. Books, newspapers and magazines;
4. Lease of residential houses not exceeding ₱10,000 monthly;
5. Sale of low-cost house and lot not exceeding ₱2.5 million
6. Sales of persons and establishments earning not more than ₱1.5 million annually.

==== Tariffs and duties ====
Second to the BIR in terms of revenue collection, the Bureau of Customs (BOC) imposes tariffs and duties on all items imported into the Philippines. According to Executive Order 206, returning residents, Overseas Filipino Workers (OFW's) and former Filipino citizens are exempted from paying duties and tariffs.

=== Non-tax revenue ===
Non-tax revenue makes up a small percentage of total government revenue (roughly less than 20%), and consists of collections of fees and licenses, privatization proceeds and income from other state enterprises.

==== The Bureau of the Treasury ====
The Bureau of the Treasury (BTr) manages the finances of the government, by attempting to maximize revenue collected and minimize spending. The bulk of non-tax revenues comes from the BTr's income. Under Executive Order No.449, the BTr collects revenue by issuing, servicing and redeeming government securities, and by controlling the Securities Stabilization Fund (which increases the liquidity and stabilizes the value of government securities) through the purchase and sale of government bills and bonds.

==== Privatization ====
Privatization in the Philippines occurred in three waves: The first wave in 1986–1987, the second during 1990 and the third stage, which is presently taking place. The government's privatization program is handled by the inter-agency Privatization Council and the Privatization and Management Office, a sub-branch of the Department of Finance.

==== PAGCOR ====
The Philippine Amusement and Gaming Corporation (PAGCOR) is a government-owned corporation established in 1977 to stop illegal casino operations. PAGCOR is mandated to regulate and license gambling (particularly in casinos), generate revenues for the Philippine government through its own casinos and promote tourism in the country.

== Spending, debt and financing ==
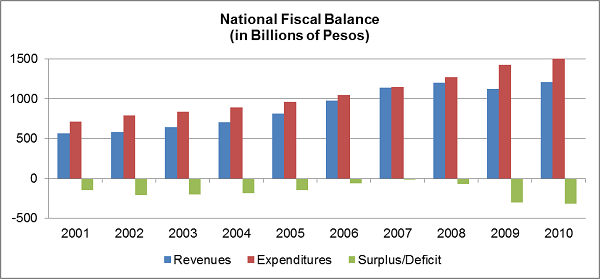
A comparative graph of National Revenues and Expenditures from 2001 to 2010

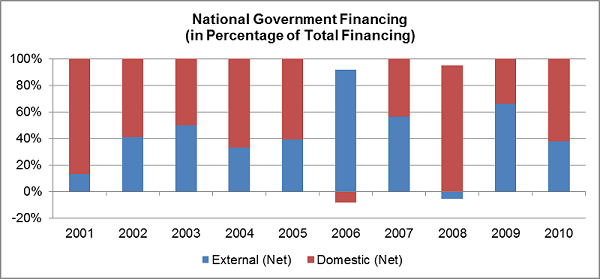
A comparative graph of Domestic and External Sources of Financing from 2001 to 2010

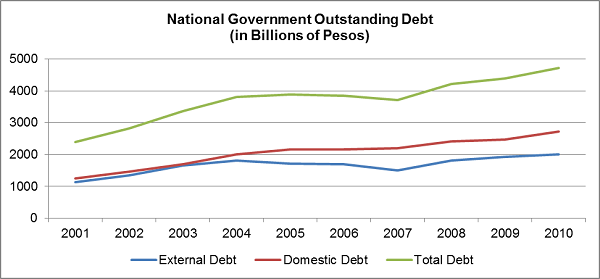
A comparative graph of Total National Debt from 2001 to 2010

=== Government spending and fiscal imbalance ===
In 2010, the Philippine government spent a total of ₱1.5 trillion and earned a total of ₱1.2 trillion from tax and non-tax revenues, thus resulting to a total deficit of ₱314.5 trillion.

Despite the national deficit of the Philippines, the Department of Finance reported an average of ₱29.6 billion in local government unit (LGU) surplus, which is mostly due to an improved LGU financial monitoring system which the government implemented in the recent years. Efforts of the monitoring system include "debt monitoring and creditworthiness monitoring system, effective mobilization of second generation funds (SGF) to promote LGU development, and the implementation of a Land Administration and Management Project (LAMP2) which received a 'very good' rating from the World Bank (WB) and Australian Agency for International Development (AusAid)."

Microfinance management in the Philippines is improving substantially. In 2009, the Economist Intelligence Unit "recognized the Philippines as the best in the world in terms of its microfinance regulatory framework." The DOF-National Credit Council (DOF-NCC) focused on improving the state of local cooperatives by developing a supervision and examination manual, launching advocacies for these cooperatives, and pushing for the Philippine Cooperative Code of 2008. A standardized national strategy for microinsurance and the provisions of grants and technical assistance were formulated.

=== Financing and debt ===
Aside from Tax and Non-Tax Revenues, the government makes use of other sources of financing to support its expenses. In 2010, the government borrowed a total net of ₱351.646 billion for financing:

	Domestic Sources	External Sources
Gross Financing	₱489.844 billion	₱257.357 billion
Less: Repayments/Amortization	₱271.246 billion	₱124.309 billion
Net Financing	₱218.598 billion	₱133.048 billion
Total Financing	₱979.688 billion	₱351.646 billion

External Sources of Financing are:

1. Program and Project Loans – the government offers project loans to external bodies and uses the proceeds to fund domestic projects like infrastructure, agriculture, and other government projects.
2. Credit Facility Loans
3. Zero-coupon Treasury Bills
4. Global Bonds
5. Foreign Currencies

Domestic Sources of Financing are

1. Treasury Bonds
2. Facility loans
3. Treasury Bills
4. Bond Exchanges
5. Promissory Notes
6. Term Deposits

In 2010, the total outstanding debt of the Philippines reached ₱4.718 trillion: ₱2.718 trillion from outstanding domestic sources and ₱2 trillion from foreign sources. According to the Department of Finance, the country has recently reduced dependency on external sources to minimize the risks caused by changes in the global exchange rates. Efforts to reduce national debt include increasing tax efforts and decreasing government spending. The Philippine government has also entered talks with other economic entities, like the ASEAN Finance Ministers Meeting (AFMM), ASEAN+3 Finance Ministers Meeting (AFMM+3), Asia-Pacific Economic Cooperation (APEC), and ASEAN Single-Window Technical Working Group (ASW-TWG), in order to strengthen the countries' and the region's debt management efforts.

== History of Philippine financial management ==
=== Marcos Administration (1981–1985) ===
The tax system under the Marcos administration was generally regressive as it was heavily dependent on indirect taxes. Indirect taxes and international trade taxes accounted for about 35% of total tax revenue, while direct taxes only accounted for 25%. Government expenditure for economic services peaked during this period, focusing mainly on infrastructure development, with about 33% of the budget spent on capital outlays. In response to the higher global interest rates and to the depreciation of the peso, the government became increasingly reliant on domestic financing to finance fiscal deficit. The government also started liberalizing tariff policy during this period by enacting the initial Tariff Reform Program, which narrowed the tariff structure from a range of 100%–0% to 50%–10%, and the Import Liberalization Program, which aimed at reducing or eliminating tariffs and realigning indirect taxes.

=== Corazon Aquino (1986–1992) ===
During the final years of the Marcos administration, from 1981 to 1985, the overall revenue effort averaged 11.7 percent while the tax effort averaged 10.3 percent. The tax system can be characterized as heavily dependent on indirect taxes and, therefore, regressive and weak.

Recognizing the inherent weaknesses of the tax system of Ferdinand Marcos, Corazon Aquino, a few months after she took power in 1986, reformed the tax system. Under a revolutionary government, Aquino exercised executive and legislative powers and overhauled the weak tax system with virtually no resistance. The 1986 tax reform program (TRP) aimed to simplify the tax system, make revenues more responsive to economic activity, promote horizontal equity, and promote growth by correcting existing taxes that impaired business incentives.

The dual tax schedules were unified on the personal income tax system, with the lower 0-35 percent schedule adopted for both compensation and professional incomes. To minimize revenue loss and preserve the relative burden of individuals, ceilings on allowable business deductions were proposed and adopted. Unfortunately, this complementary measure was not fully implemented due to intense lobbying by various professional groups. Passive incomes were taxed at the uniform rate of 20%, rendering passive income taxation neutral concerning investment decisions involving bank deposits and royalty-generating ventures. Personal exemptions were increased to adjust for inflation and to eliminate the taxation of those earning below the poverty threshold income. Married taxpayers were allowed to file separate returns, which lowered the tax burden on married couples by removing the effects of the progressive rates on their combined incomes.

The tax on corporations was simplified. A uniform rate of 35 percent on corporate income replaced the two-tiered corporate tax structure. Tax on inter-corporate dividends was eliminated, and the tax on dividends was phased out gradually over three years. The exemptions from income taxes of franchise grantees were withdrawn. The imposition of an income tax on franchise grantees put this previously favored group on an equal footing with similarly situated individuals or firms. Uniform franchise taxes were imposed on similar types of utilities.

As a result of the 1986 tax reform program, average tax effort rose to 13.1 percent during the Aquino administration (1986–1992) and to 16.2 percent during the Ramos administration (1993–1998). Revenue effort rose steadily until the next round of tax reforms. Tax effort increased from 10.7% in 1985 to 15.4% in 1992, then peaked at 17.0% in 1997. The share of direct taxes to total taxes increased while that of trade taxes decreased. Income taxes could have performed better, and the tax system's fairness enhanced, had BIR implemented fully the approved reform imposing ceilings on allowable deductions. Overall responsiveness of the tax system to changes in economic activity improved from an average of 0.9% from 1980–1985 to an average of 1.5% from 1986 to 1991. The buoyancy coefficient for import duties rose from an average of 0.5% before the reform to an average of 1.89% from 1986 to 1991.

=== Ramos Administration (1993–1998) ===
The Ramos administration had budget surpluses for four of its six years in power. The government benefited from the massive sale of government assets (totalling to about ₱70 billion, the biggest among the administrations) and continued to benefit from the 1986 TRP. The administration invested heavily on the power sector as the country was beset by power outages. The government utilized its emergency powers to fast-track the construction of power projects and established contracts s administration relied heavily on external borrowing to finance its fiscal deficit but quickly switched to domestic dependence on the onset of the Asian financial crisis. The administration has been accused of resorting to “budget trickery” during the crisis: balancing

=== Estrada Administration (1999–2000) ===
President Estrada, who assumed office at the height of the Asian financial crisis, faced a large fiscal deficit, which was mainly attributed to the sharp deterioration in the tax effort (as a result of the 1997 CTRP: increased tax incentives, narrowing of VAT base and lowering of tariff walls) and higher interest payments given the sharp depreciation of the peso during the crisis. The administration also had to pay P60 billion worth of accounts payables left unpaid by the Ramos administration to contractors and suppliers. Public spending focused on social services, with spending on basic education reaching its peak. To finance the fiscal deficit, Estrada created a balance between domestic and foreign borrowing.

=== Arroyo Administration (2002–2009) ===
The Arroyo administration in 2001 inherited a poor fiscal position that was attributed to weakening tax effort (still resulting from the 1997 CTRP) and rising debt servicing costs (due to peso depreciation). Large fiscal deficits and heavy losses for monitored government corporations lingered from 2001 to 2004 as her caretaker administration struggled to reverse downward trends. Following her election in 2004, the national debt-to-GDP ratio reached a high of 79% in that year, before dropping every year thereafter to 57.5% by 2009, her last full year in office. Lesser roads and bridges and other infrastructure were built during the Arroyo administration compare to the previous three administrations. Educational spending likewise increased from only Ps 9.3 Billion in 2001 to Ps 22.7 Billion by 2009. The cost of medicines was brought down by as much as 50% as a result of the Cheaper Medicines Act and the opening of Botikas ng Bayan and Botikas ng Barangay, while the ground-breaking conditional cash transfers (CCT) program was adapted from Latin America to stimulate positive behaviors among the poor. As a result, the Arroyo administration contributed to ever-declining levels in self-rated poverty, from a high of 68% at the start of the Ramons administration, to around 50% at the end of the Arroyo one. Much of the fuel for government activism came from an expanded value-added tax (from 10% to 12%) in 2005 (see final reports of various Cabinet agencies concerned), which with other fiscal reforms paved the way for successive sovereign credit rating upgrades by the time Arroyo stepped down in June 2010. These fiscal reforms complemented conservative liquidity management by the Central Bank, allowing the peso, for the first time ever, to close even stronger at the end of a presidential term than at the start.
