= Waterloo, New York =

- Town
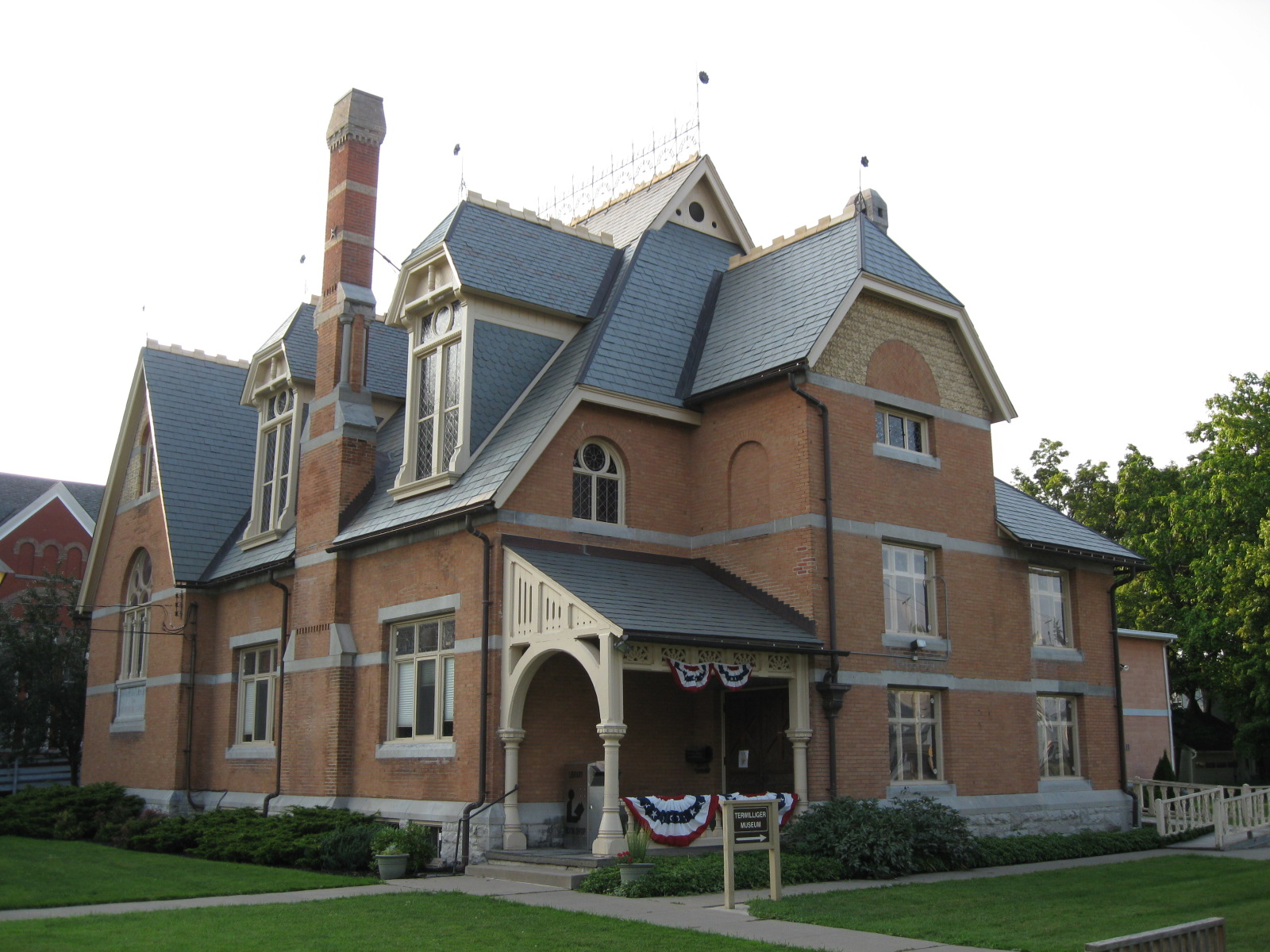
- Library in Waterloo

- Location within the state of New York
- Coordinates: 42°55′16″N 76°51′42″W
- Country: United States
- State: New York
- County: Seneca
- Settled: 1800; 226 years ago
- Established: March 26, 1829; 197 years ago
- Named for: Battle of Waterloo

Area
  - Total: 21.81 sq mi (56.50 km^{2})
  - Land: 21.67 sq mi (56.12 km^{2})
  - Water: 0.15 sq mi (0.38 km^{2})
- Elevation: 469 ft (143 m)

Population (2020)
  - Total: 7,378
  - Estimate (2022): 7,256
- Time zone: UTC-5 (Eastern (EST))
  - Summer (DST): UTC-4 (EDT)
- ZIP Code: 13165
- Area codes: 315 and 680
- FIPS code: 36-78564
- GNIS feature ID: 0979603
- Website: https://waterlootown.org/

Waterloo is a town in Seneca County, New York, United States. The population was 7,378 at the 2020 census. The town and its major community are named after Waterloo, Belgium, where Napoleon was defeated.

There is also a village called Waterloo, the primary county seat of Seneca County. The Town of Waterloo is situated on the western border of the county, east of Geneva.

== History ==
The area was the domain of the Seneca tribe and Cayuga tribe, who were visited in the 17th century by Jesuit missionaries. The Sullivan Expedition passed through the area in 1779 to destroy the natives and their villages. After the war, the area was in the Central New York Military Tract, reserved for veterans.

The region was first settled circa 1800.

The town was formed from the Town of Junius in 1829 and was named after Waterloo, Belgium likely after the Battle of Waterloo.

The town of Waterloo was nationally recognized as the birthplace of Memorial Day in 1966 by President Lyndon B. Johnson. House Concurrent Resolution 587 officially recognized the town as having started the tradition of Memorial Day as a day of remembrance for the lives lost in war. Local pharmacist Henry C. Welles first thought of the holiday in the summer of 1865, however it was not until May 5th, 1866, when the holiday was first celebrated. In 1868 Waterloo joined other communities in observing the holiday on May 30th and in accordance with General Logan’s orders the holiday is still observed on the 30th of May to this day.

== Geography ==
According to the United States Census Bureau, the town has a total area of 21.8 square miles (56.5 km^{2}), of which 21.7 square miles (56.1 km^{2}) is land and 0.1 square mile (0.4 km^{2}) (0.67%) is water.

The western town line is the border of Ontario County, New York, and part of the southern town boundary is Seneca Lake and the Seneca River/Cayuga-Seneca Canal.

The New York State Route 5/U.S. Route 20 concurrency is a major east–west highway in Waterloo. New York State Route 96 is a highway that turns southward at Waterloo village.

== Demographics ==
Historical population
Census	Pop.	Note	%±
1830	1,837		—
1840	3,036		65.3%
1850	3,795		25.0%
1860	4,594		21.1%
1870	4,469		−2.7%
1880	4,309		−3.6%
1890	4,681		8.6%
1900	4,659		−0.5%
1910	4,429		−4.9%
1920	4,287		−3.2%
1930	4,569		6.6%
1940	4,730		3.5%
1950	5,524		16.8%
1960	6,891		24.7%
1970	7,763		12.7%
1980	7,811		0.6%
1990	7,765		−0.6%
2000	7,866		1.3%
2010	7,642		−2.8%
2020	7,338		−4.0%
2022 (est.)	7,256	▼	−1.1%
U.S. Decennial Census

As of the census of 2020, there were 7,378 people and 3,394 households, residing in the town. The population density was 352.2 inhabitants per square mile (136.0/km^{2}). The racial makeup of the town was 86.7% White, 1.3% Black or African American, 0.0% Native American, 0.1% Asian, 0.0% Pacific Islander, 0.4% from other races, and 10.8% from two or more races. Hispanic or Latino of any race were 7.5% of the population.

As of the 2010 census there were 3,118 households, out of which 26.1% had children under the age of 18 living with them, 44.6% were married couples living together, 13.2% had a female householder with no husband present, and 35.6% were non-families. 28.8% of all households were made up of individuals, and 11.9% had someone living alone who was 65 years of age or older. The average household size was 2.35 and the average family size was 2.83.

In the town, the population was spread out, with 23.5% under the age of 20, 5.7% from 20 to 24, 23.1% from 25 to 44, 29.5% from 45 to 64, and 18.2% who were 65 years of age or older. The median age was 43.3 years. For every 100 females, there were 92.3 males. For every 100 females age 18 and over, there were 89.9 males.

The median income for a household in the town was $43,527, and the median income for a family was $53,625. Males had a median income of $39,743 versus $30,211 for females. The per capita income for the town was $23,147. About 7.6% of families and 10.2% of the population were below the poverty line, including 11.7% of those under age 18 and 4.6% of those age 65 or over.

=== Housing ===
There were 3,386 housing units at an average density of 156.0 per square mile (60.2/km^{2}); 7.9% of housing units were vacant.

There were 3,118 occupied housing units in the town, of which 2,179 were owner-occupied units (69.9%), while 939 were renter-occupied (30.1%). The homeowner vacancy rate was 1.2% of total units. The rental unit vacancy rate was 10.1%.

== Schools ==
=== Public schools ===
- Skoi-Yase School is a public school that teaches Grades Pre-School to Grade 2.
- Lafayette Intermediate School is a public school that teaches Grades 3–5.
- Waterloo Middle School is a public school that teaches Grades 6–8.
- Waterloo High School teaches Grades 9–12.

=== Private schools ===
- Fayette Mennonite School is a private Mennonite school that teaches Grades 1–8. Its enrollment is about 50 students. The current head teacher is Elizabeth Zimmerman.

== Communities and locations in the Town of Waterloo ==
- Border City – A hamlet near the western town line and Geneva. (See also Serven below.)
- Dobbins Corner – A hamlet at the west town line on County Road 112.
- East Geneva – A hamlet also near the western town boundary on US-20/NY-5.
- Packwood Corners – A hamlet on US-20/NY-5, on the southern town line.
- Parr Harbour – A location west of Waterloo village on US-20/NY-5.
- Seneca Lake State Park – A state park in the southwestern corner of the town.
- Seneca Meadows – New York State's largest active landfill
- Serven – A location overlapping the portions of Border City and East Geneva northeast of the Northern Terminus of 96A. Extends between 96A and Packwood Road along US-20/NY-5.
- Waterloo – The Village of Waterloo on US-20/NY-5, at the southern town line, partly in the Town of Fayette.
- Women's Rights National Historical Park – A unit of the National Park System administered by the National Park Service. The M'Clintock House and the Hunt House sites are located in Waterloo while the other sites associated with the park are located in Seneca Falls.
- National Memorial Day Museum- listed on the National Register of Historic Places. This Museum is in the Historic William H. Burton House and is located in Waterloo. NY on US-20/NY-5

== Notable people ==
- Louise Blanchard Bethune, architect
- Tom Coughlin, former New York Giants and Jacksonville Jaguars' head coach.
- Mike McLaughlin, NASCAR driver.
- William J. Pomeroy, author and participant in Hukbalahap rebellion in Philippines.
- Louise Scherbyn, motorcyclist and founder of the Women's International Motorcycle Association (WIMA).
- Charles E. Stuart, U.S. Representative and Senator from Michigan.
- George Bradshaw Kelly, U.S. Representative for New York's 38th congressional district, from 1937 to 1939.
- Agnes Woodward, professional whistler, born in Waterloo
- Samuel Birdsall, Former U.S Representative from Waterloo, NY
- George Murray Hulbert, Former U.S Representative from Waterloo, NY
- Peter Whitmer Sr., early member of The Church of Jesus Christ of Latter Day Saints, and father of the church's second founding family.
- Charles E. Stuart, Former Senator and Representative for the state of Michigan
