= Casto Alejandrino =

Filipino guerrilla leader

- Born: November 18, 1911; Arayat, Pampanga
- Died: July 12, 2005 (aged 93)
- Other names: Guan Yek; GY; Torres; GI; Tatang
- Occupation: Vice-commander of the Hukbalahap
- Organization(s): Hukbalahap; Aguman ding Maldang Talapagobra
- Political party: Partido Komunista ng Pilipinas-1930
- Spouses: Teofista Valerio; Belen Bagul-Bagul

Casto Jurado Alejandrino (November 18, 1911 – July 12, 2005) was a Filipino peasant leader and commander of the Hukbalahap. He was the Hukbalahap's vice-commander, second only to its Supremo, Luis Taruc. Alejandrino was one of the few supporters of the Hukbalahap that were also landlords, coming from the Alejandrino family which included former revolutionary general Jose Alejandrino.

== Biography ==
Alejandrino was born on November 18, 1911, in Arayat, Pampanga. His family included Jose Alejandrino, the former revolutionary general and Senator. In the 1930s, Alejandrino managed to inherit 68 hectares of land in Arayat with fourteen tenants. He also became an active spokesperson for the peasant group Aguman ding Maldang Talapagobra (AMT, translated as League of Poor Laborers) and the Partido Sosyalista ng Pilipinas (PSP, translated as Socialist Party of the Philippines). In 1938, when the PSP merged with the Partido Komunista ng Pilipinas, Alejandrino held a position in the party's central committee. During the 1940 elections, Alejandrino ran under the AMT-endorsed Popular Front ticket and won a seat as mayor of Arayat.

During World War II, members of the PKP along with peasant groups such as the AMT and the Kalipunang Pambansa ng Magbubukid sa Pilipinas (KPMP) convened in Cabiao, Nueva Ecija, to discuss organization, strategy, and tactics. A Central Luzon Bureau was formed and Alejandrino was elected as second-in-command of its military committee, under Luis Taruc. A month later, on March 29, 1942, peasant guerrillas and members of the AMT and the KPMP met again in Cabiao to form the Hukbalahap. It was headed by Taruc, Alejandrino, who also served as its vice-commander, Felipa Culala, and Bernardo Poblete.

During this time, Alejandrino adopted multiple aliases, such as Guan Yek (GY), Torres, GI, and Tatang. Alejandrino participated in guerrilla activity at this time, commanding Reco 3 in addition to his duties as General HQ vice-commander. The Huks also set up "provisional governments" in its liberated areas, and Alejandrino was appointed the governor of Pampanga.

At the close of the Second World War, American officials began arresting members of the Hukbalahap on charges of sedition. Alejandrino was arrested along with other leaders in February 1945 in San Fernando, Pampanga. A CIC report stated that their arrest was "the only way to end Huk domination in the area". They were freed in September 1945. The Hukbalahap was officially disbanded and a Huk Veterans' League, with Alejandrino as its nominal chair. The purpose of the Veterans' League was to help get the Hukbalahap recognized as a legitimate guerrilla movement. During this time, the relationship between the American forces and the Hukbalahap deteriorated further, owing to its antagonistic relationship with the USAFFE guerrillas. Huk veterans were persecuted and charged with sedition and rebellion, and some veterans chose to not descend from the mountains. This lack of recognition, combined with peasant abuses by the landowning class, and the results of the 1946 elections, added to the growing unrest in Central Luzon. This led to former Huk veterans going back to the mountains, a situation described as a "spontaneous peasant revolution".

In June 1946, veterans of the Hukbalahap met in Candaba, Pampanga, to form a contingency plan. The Central Luzon Command and the South Luzon Command were both established. Alejandrino was again elected vice-commander. Two months later, Juan Feleo, a noted peasant activist, was taken and killed by armed men. As a result of this, the peasantry took to arms against the government in open rebellion, reforming the Hukbalahap as the Hukbong Mapagpalaya ng Bayan (HMB). Alejandrino would resume his guerrilla activities, commanding Reco 4 from 1949 to 1951.

On February 15, 1954, Alejandrino went into talks with the Magsaysay administration, which failed. That April, he arrived in the Bulacan area of the Sierra Madre, carrying an order from the PKP secretariat to arrest Taruc on charges of deviating from the party line, leading to Taruc's surrender to the government. Alejandrino continued the struggle for three more years. In 1957, Alejandrino met up with remnants of the HMB in Zambales and gradually implemented a strategy of legal struggle, ending the armed rebellion of the Hukbalahap.

On October 21, 1960, Alejandrino was arrested in Malabon on charges of violating RA 1700, known as the Anti-Subversion Law, and was imprisoned, only being released in 1975. He died on July 12, 2005.

== Personal life ==
Alejandrino was a member of the well-to-do Alejandrino family, who were landowners in Pampanga. Members include General Jose Alejandrino, Pio Valenzuela (through Valenzuela's mother's side), Arayat mayor Bonifacio Emmanuel "Bon" Alejandrino, and president of the Hukvets foundation, Carlos Alejandrino. Bon and Carlos are both Casto's nephews.

During his time in the guerrilla movement, Alejandrino had a wife and children living in the barrio. He also had two "forest wives" while in the field, Teofista Valerio and Belen Bagul-Bagul. Valerio (alias "Estrella") was the head of Huk communications in Manila. Valerio and Alejandrino were married in a Huk ceremony on May 26, 1948. Alejandrino and Valerio were separated on August 4, 1949, and would not meet until exactly twenty years later in 1970. They had one daughter. After Valerio's arrest and their separation, Alejandrino met Belen Bagul-Bagul. They were never married, although they had five children.
