= William J. Pomeroy =

American communist (1916–2009)

- Born: November 25, 1916; Waterloo, New York, U.S.
- Died: January 12, 2009 (aged 92); London, England, U.K.
- Occupation: Author

William J. Pomeroy (November 25, 1916 – January 12, 2009) was an American communist, poet, author, and ghostwriter, who served the American army in the Pacific during World War II. He had a connection with the Philippine guerillas during the war, supplying them with materials. He also organized a protest against the decision of the U.S. government to treat the guerillas as enemies. He married Celia Mariano, a Filipina who was a member of the Hukbalahap in 1948.

In 1952, he and Celia were captured by government forces at Sitio Talba, Barrio Pias, Papaya (now General Tinio), Nueva Ecija in the Sierra Madre in the Philippines. They were given a life sentence, but were released in 1962, although Celia was refused a passport. Pomeroy began to campaign, including lobbying Bertrand Russell and Graham Greene. The fight was successful but the Pomeroys were denied entry to the US, so instead settled in England.

== Early life ==
William Joseph "Bill" Pomeroy was born at Waterloo, New York, on November 25, 1916, to William C. Pomeroy, a factory worker, and Bertha Pomeroy.

He came from a working-class family. During the 1930s he moved from job to job and read avidly. By 1937, he was a factory worker in Rochester, New York. He joined the Young Communist League in 1938.

== Military career ==
Pomeroy served in the United States Armed Forces, particularly in the U.S. Air Force. He was drafted at Rochester (his hometown) in October 1942. He was deployed from California for the Pacific theater, arriving first at Brisbane in December 1943 where he was assigned as an aviation and engineering mechanic for the Fifth Bomber Group. His skill in writing later made him being assigned to public relations and the 10th Historical Unit. He later moved to New Guinea and eventually, to the Philippines.

Pomeroy participated in the liberation of the Philippines from Japan at the final months of World War II.

In his entire military career, he took part in four campaigns. He received seven decorations:

- Good Conduct Medal
- Asiatic Pacific Medal (4 bronze stars)
- American Theater Medal
- World War II Victory Medal
- Army of Occupation Medal for Japan
- Philippine Liberation Medal (2 bronze stars)
- Philippine Presidential Unit Citation

He was neither court-martialed nor an AWOL. In November 1945, he returned to the United States, where he stayed at the Bolling Field and later at Camp Dix, New Jersey, where he was given an honorable discharge on April 11, 1946. Pomeroy, as stated by cables in 1952, was a technical sergeant.

== Life in the Philippines ==
=== First years since his return ===
Disgruntled at his post-military civilian life, Pomeroy decided to return to the Philippines in late 1947, leaving his parents and his brother at their residence at Rochester. He reportedly renounced his American citizenship.

He then took part in establishing communist front youth movements.

He enrolled at the University of the Philippines for a four-year journalism course. However, after two years, in 1949, after studying the United States Bill of Rights, he quit and left Manila.

In 1948, Pomeroy married Celia Mariano of Manila; a Bachelor of Science graduate at the same university who joined a communist group in the city in April 1940, and later the Huks—then the anti-Japanese resistance movement.

=== Involvement in the Huk rebellion ===
At the time of the 1949 nationwide elections, Pomeroy joined the Huks, where he remained for the next three years. He became its propaganda chief.

The couple joined the communist Huks, stayed at the Sierra Madre and Tanay mountains, both guerrilla strongholds. They were active educational leaders who reportedly taught in "Stalin Universities", the movement's training school.

The Philippine Army placed Pomeroy and his wife 12th and 13th, respectively, in the hierarchy. There was a $15,000 reward for his capture or death.

In the end of January 1952, Pomeroy was reported seriously wounded in a military encounter while leading his group to a Huk conference somewhere in central or southern Luzon.

In April, Operation Four Roses was launched, aimed to neutralize the Huks' high command and to capture its four highest-ranking members.

At the beginning of the campaign, on April 11, Good Friday, Pomeroy, along with 14 fellow guerrillas, was the first to be captured by the Philippine 12th Battalion Combat Team in the part of Sierra Madre at Talbak, near the provincial boundary of Bulacan and Quezon. He was reported being marched out of the mountains, with his captors brought with him a confiscated typewriter. After three days, they reached Manila for him to meet defense secretary Ramon Magsaysay.

Mariano, who escaped to the mountains with four others at the time of Pomeroy's capture, was captured after a day or two.

==== Incarceration ====
The couple was later detained at Camp Murphy. Pomeroy later renounced communism. Magsaysay, in his U.S. visit in mid-June, reported that after Pomeroy's capture, there were three of four other Americans still with the Huks; and indicated the national government would not deport him who wanted to stay in the country.

On June 7, the couple was charged in the Court of First Instance of Manila with rebellion—a crime punishable by death—with murder, arson, robbery, and kidnapping. On June 18, they pleaded guilty, and were then convicted and sentenced to reclusión perpetua.

In early 1958, the Supreme Court (SC) ruled in a separate rebellion case that such a catch-all charges are unconstitutional. On August 18, the couple filed petitions for writs of habeas corpus, appealing the 1952 verdict and contending that they should be convicted of only simple rebellion, which is punishable of 12-year prison term. The Court of First Instance of Rizal, through its August 27 decision, ordered their release after finding that they were qualified for serving already the good conduct time allowance and a half of the preventive imprisonment.

The order, however, was reversed by the SC on February 24, 1960, stating that the couple must serve their original prison term for taking part of the Huk rebellion, and that its 1958 ruling is not applicable for them because it is not retroactive.

An appeal was later made to president Carlos P. Garcia for their release. On December 29, 1961, the couple was reported pardoned by Garcia (whose presidential term was to end) who also ordered the deportation of Pomeroy to the United States as a condition. They were released on December 31. Pomeroy was given 30 days for his departure, and was later held in Manila port area.

Pomeroy was later deported to the United States. There, he failed to persuade the authorities to grant his wife a visa, while at the same time she was unable to get a Philippine passport.

== Personal life ==
At the time of his departure in Manila, Pomeroy, being six feet in height and had black eyes, was also described as strong and had good posture. After his arrest three years later, he ended very thin and walking slowly at the march with his captors; but reportedly gained weight after two months.

== Writing ==
Prolific as a writer, Pomeroy contributed to Daily World on developments in Africa, Latin America, Asia, Europe, and the Philippines. His publications included Apartheid, Imperialism, and African Freedom; Apartheid Axis: United States and South Africa; American Neo-Colonialism: Its Emergence in the Philippines and Asia; Guerrilla Warfare and Marxism; The Forest (1963). He also published a collection of short stories, Trail of Blame, and poetry: Beyond Barriers and Sonnets for Celia (1963), the latter comprising love poems for his wife composed while they were in prison. He served as the ghostwriter for the autobiography of Luis Taruc, a leader of the Hukbalahap group, titled Born of the People (1953).

== Publications and external links ==
- Pomeroy, William J. "Half a Century of Socialism: Soviet Life in the Sixties". New York: International Publishers, 1967.
- Guerrilla Warfare and Marxism, edited by Pomeroy, 1968.
