= Waterloo CSD =

Waterloo CSD may refer to:

- Waterloo Community School District (Iowa)
- Waterloo Central School District (New York)
