= Waterloo High School (New York) =

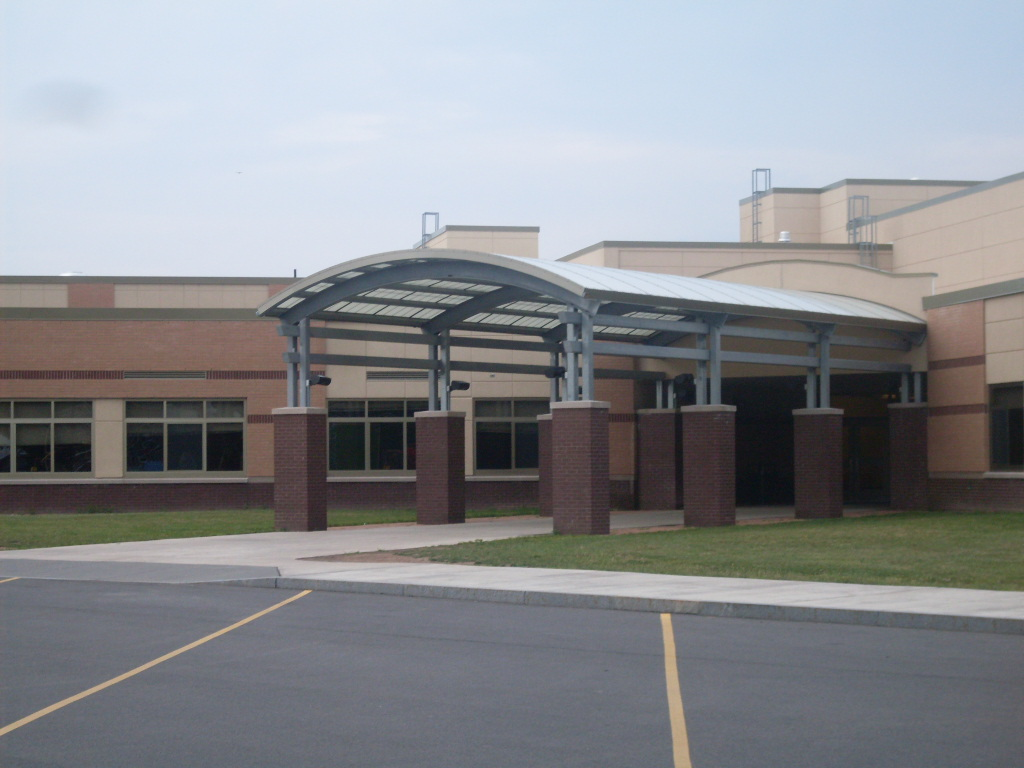

Location
- 96 Stark St; Waterloo, New York 13165; United States; 42°54′48.72″N 76°52′13.37″W

Information
- Type: Public
- Established: 1929
- School district: Waterloo Central School District
- NCES School ID: 360001401425
- Principal: James J. Karcz
- Teaching staff: 44.80 (on an FTE basis)
- Grades: 9-12
- Enrollment: 404 (2024-2025)
- Student to teacher ratio: 9.02
- Campus: Rural
- Colors: Black and Orange
- Slogan: All Students. All Staff. One Family
- Athletics conference: Section V (NYSPHSAA)
- Mascot: Tiger
- Rival: Mynderse Academy
- Newspaper: The Tribune
- Yearbook: Skoi-Yase
- Website: whs.waterloocsd.org

Waterloo High School is a public high school located in Waterloo, New York, United States. As of 2021, it has an enrollment of 471 students from grades 9–12. Waterloo High School is ranked 816th within New York. Students have the opportunity to take Advanced Placement® coursework and exams. The AP® participation rate at Waterloo High School is 19%. The total minority enrollment is 12%, and 57% of students are economically disadvantaged. The current principal is James Karcz and the assistant principals are Tabitha Morris and Katherine Tucker.

== History ==
Waterloo Senior High School was completed in 1929, and was located at 202 West Main Street in Waterloo. Following district centralization in 1939, it served as home for both the junior high and senior high grades. Due to overcrowding, a new senior high building was constructed at 65 Center Street and was completed in time for the 1961-1962 school year. It originally held grades 9 through 12, but again due to crowding issues, the 9th grade was moved to the middle school building on West Main Street until a new wing was constructed on the North end of the building. This wing would house several new classrooms, mostly in the social studies and English departments, as well as a library and study hall classroom. The east wing housed foreign language, mathematics, and the assistant principal's office. The south wing was a longer stretch that contained the nurse, guidance, and the main and principal's office, as well as science classrooms. This wing included a hallway that stretched south vertically and included more science rooms, art and music classrooms, and the cafeteria. The west wing held the gymnasium and home economics.

In January 2006 construction was completed on a new school, attached the western wing of the old building. The old high school houses the district middle school.

== School layout ==
The entrance to the current high school leads through the main office and to an atrium, housing rest areas and the school library, now shared with the middle school. The high school has three main wings on the first floor, with the first wing originally containing English, Spanish, and the guidance office, and the second wing originally containing mostly social Studies, special education, and science. The two wings were connected by a pair of hallways, one leading to the gymnasium and two smaller classrooms, and the other hallway leading to a wing that protruded westward containing art and technology. A rectangular east wing was also constructed that leads to the cafeteria, as well as housing in-school suspension, and the music classrooms. The second wing contains the school's second floor, originally housing mathematics, French, business, and science. This departmental organization of the School was changed when the Freshmen Academy was added to the high school, with teachers of Grade 9 courses were moved to the second floor, swapping classrooms with math teachers who did not teach Grade 9.

=== Scheduling ===
Since January 2001, Waterloo High School has utilized block scheduling for its daily schedule. Classes meet for 40 minutes a day every academic day, with a daily advisory period held in between second and fourth and fifth period. Each academic day holds eight periods, followed by Academic Achievement, Late Detention, and Activity Period.

=== Freshman Academy ===
Waterloo began a Freshman Academy in the 2007-2008 school year. In an effort to increase academic performance and ease the transition from middle school to high school, all freshmen students were scheduled together in teams, with classes primarily based on the second floor.

== Extra/co-curricular activities ==
- Chorus
- Class Offices
- Drama Club
- Drum Line
- French Club
- Future Teachers of America
- Instrumental Music
- Masterminds
- National Honor Society
- Newspaper
- Rotary/Interact
- SADD
- Ski Club
- Student Council
- SURGE After School Program
- Women's Chorale
- Varsity Club
- Yearbook

== Notable alumni ==
- Tom Coughlin - head coach for the New York Giants
- Matt Lamanna - paleontologist
- Mike McLaughlin - former NASCAR driver
- John Schweitz - former NBA player
- Derek Slywka – professional football defensive back
- Steven Stanzak - a New York University student who spent eight months living in the school's library.
- Kevin Sylvester - radio host on WGR for the Buffalo Sabres.
