= Bikerni Association of Women Motorcyclists =

Indian all-women motorcycle club

The Bikerni: Association of Women Motorcyclists
- Pronunciation: bye kur nee
- Formation: January 15, 2011; 15 years ago
- Founder: Urvashi Patole; Firdaus Shaikh
- Founded at: Pune, Maharashtra, India
- Type: Motorcycle club
- Purpose: Women motorcyclists awareness and advocacy
- Headquarters: Pune
- Location: India
- Region served: India
- Members: 2,000+ (2019)
- Official language: Hindi, English
- Board of directors: Urvashi Patole, Firdaus Shaikh, Vartika Pande, Mugdha Chaudhary, Sharvari Manakawad
- Website: about.me/thebikerni

The Bikerni Association of Women Motorcyclists (shortened as The Bikerni) is an all-women motorcycle club in India. It was founded in Pune in 2011 by Urvashi Patole and Firdaus Shaikh, and grew to over 515 members by 2014. As of 2015, the group has over 2,000 members. It is recognized by the Women's International Motorcycle Association and is the first and largest all-women motorcycle association in India. Its Delhi chapter was started by Shabnam Akram in 2012. As of 2021, the club operates 17 chapters across India.
