= Seneca Meadows Landfill =

Landfill in New York, United States

Coordinates: 42.914016°N 76.844945°W

Seneca Meadows, owned by Seneca Meadows, Inc. (SMI) is a landfill in Seneca Falls, New York, near Town of Waterloo, with almost 400 acres (160 ha) of landfill and a 2,600 acres (1,100 ha) facility. It is the largest active landfill in New York State, as well as Seneca County's fourth largest industrial employer. At peak times, the company employs more than 160 full-time workers. In 2005, it accepted more than 6,000 tons of garbage a day from multiple states (then three). The height limit was 280 feet (85 m).

Methane gas is sent to a nearby independent facility for producing electricity, some of which Seneca Meadows buys back for its own power needs. Seneca Meadows began producing gas for electricity in 1995, then producing 2.4 Megawatts. Today it produces 18 Megawatts, enough to power 15,000 to 18,000 homes. Seneca Meadows parent company, IESI Corporation, claims that the revenue of the landfill is around $48 million.

In the 2020s, as the existing operating license neared expiration, the owners sought to expand the landfill in both area and height, which was met with opposition amongst the nearby residents and municipalities. The swale between the existing mounds would be filled in and extend the peak height of the landfill by over 70 feet (21 m) to about 350 feet (107 m). The town voted to expire the operating license at the end of 2025, but this was not recognized by county and state authorities and the landfill continues to operate into 2026. The company plans to continue operations until 2040.

== History ==
The landfill accepts trash from New York, Massachusetts, Connecticut, New Jersey and Pennsylvania. It will continue its operation through at least 2023.

The site was first created in 1953 and owned by the Tantalo Construction. Tantalo Construction was later purchased and the corporation's name was changed to Seneca Meadows Inc. Seneca Meadows Inc. was later purchased by Canadian company IESI.

Seneca Meadows recycles about two million tires a year, making it one of the largest tire recyclers in the country. The tires are chopped up and the chips used in place of stone for drainage.

In 2007, a 181-acre (0.73 km^{2}) expansion was added that was estimated to provide 14 years of landfilling.

In 2009, Seneca Meadows opened its Environmental Education Center, a LEED Gold Certified building, which uses geothermal heat. Environmental related courses and labs for area schools are held there by the Audubon Society staff. The building was part of a wetland creation project which the landfill was required to do because natural wetland was taken by the landfill during expansion. The amount and extensiveness of the wetland created, however, was far beyond the minimum requirement, exceeding 1,000 acres in total.

In a pre-election event in 2010, New York State Senate challenger Edward O'Shea questioned his Republican opponent Mike Nozzolio for accepting a $4,000 campaign donation from Seneca Meadows. Nozzolio won re-election.

In 2015, a US$3.3 billion, 20-year contract to haul trash to Seneca Meadows from New York City by train moved towards approval. A railyard would be built adjacent the landfill to replace many of the current 50 trucks a day, carrying 1,415 tons, with approximately 30-car trains.
