= Louise Scherbyn =

American motorcyclist (1903-2003)

- Born: November 9, 1903; Waterloo, New York
- Died: June 18, 2003 (aged 99)
- Organization: Women's International Motorcycle Association
- Known for: Motorcyclist

Louise Scherbyn (November 9, 1903 - June 18, 2003) was a motorcyclist and the founder of the Women's International Motorcycle Association (WIMA).

== Early life ==
Louise Scherbyn was born on November 9, 1903 in Waterloo, a small town near Rochester, New York. As an adult, she lived in Waterloo and worked for Kodak, and her husband George worked as a pipe coverer.

== Motorcycle career ==
Scherbyn started riding motorcycles in 1932, after years of riding in a sidecar and then as a pillion passenger. Scherbyn's first motorcycle, purchased by her husband George as a gift, was a Hendee Indian Scout. She was initially concerned what others might think but was supported by women from work and embraced riding. She stayed loyal to the brand and became known for riding its bikes, which she often chose to paint white. Her 1940 model Indian Scout is held by the Springfield Museum.

Scherbyn became known as a stunt and endurance rider. She appeared in America's First All-Girl Motorcycle Show. She was recorded as the first woman to ride from the US into Canada and up as far as the Temagami Forest.

Scherbyn was also an assistant editor for The Motorcyclist magazine.

== Motorcycle clubs ==
Because Scherbyn was one of the first women motorcyclists, she was a founder or charter member of every motorcycle club that she joined. Scherbyn was a member of the American Motorcyclist Association, the Canadian Motorcycle Association, and the British Pathfinders Motor-Cycle Club. She was a member of Motor Maids but disagreed about priorities with other leadership members of the group. She believed that they focused too much on appearance and too little on sharing riding and mechanical skills.

After riding in various places in North America, Scherbyn had made contact with other women motorcyclists and formed WIMA in 1950.

== Recognition ==
Scherbyn died on 18 June 2003.

Scherbyn was inducted into the Indian Motorcycle Museum Hall of Fame in 1988. The museum also holds around 350 motorcycle toys that Scherbyn collected.
