= Juan Feleo =

Filipino peasant leader and politician

Juan Feleo (May 1, 1896 – August 24, 1946) was a Filipino peasant leader and politician. He was one of the founders of one of the Philippines' leading peasant groups, the Kalipunang Pambansa ng Magbubukid sa Pilipinas (National Confederation of Peasants in the Philippines) and a top-ranking member of the Partido Komunista ng Pilipinas. He was also involved in the HUKBALAHAP, and his death sparked the subsequent Huk Rebellion.

== Biography ==
=== Early life ===
Feleo was born on May 1, 1896, in Santa Rosa, Nueva Ecija and was the son of a small landowner who had to mortgage his land. In the early 1920s, Feleo worked as a school teacher in his own town, eventually devoting his time defending tenants in Santa Rosa against landlords who threatened to evict them. Feleo was described as a man who was too busy defending peasants to have any real job, and lived on stipends from the KPMP. Feleo, at the time, was disgusted with early peasant organizations in that he felt that they were being taken over "by men who were basically trying to get publicity for themselves and hoping to work their way onto a ticket of a major political party and get elected to office, and then forget about the peasants completely."

=== Involvement in the PKP ===
In 1919, Jacinto Manahan founded the Union de Aparceros de Filipinas, which expanded in the next decade before becoming the Kalipunang Pambansa ng Magbubukid sa Pilipinas. Feleo is noted as one of its early founders and worked tirelessly with it, partly due to his conviction that it should be a union for peasants. Initially a so-called "apolitical" peasant union, the KPMP had ties to Manuel Quezon and the Nacionalista Party. By 1928, however, the KPMP was more militant and aligned itself fully with the left. This change was largely orchestrated by both Manahan and Feleo, who was the President and First Vice President of the KPMP, respectively.

His involvement in the KPMP eventually led him to be a central member of the Partido Komunista ng Pilipinas during its initial founding, heading the PKP Peasant Department. Feleo at this time also assumed the role of KPMP General Secretary. He also served as Executive Secretary in the government's National Commission of Peasants. Feleo was noted as an impassioned orator and a notorious agitator who was detained multiple times by the Philippine Constabulary. His longest stint in jail was in October 1933, when he was sentenced for four years, nine months, and eleven days in jail.

His release coincided with the PKP's direction of creating a Popular Front party, to act as a united front against imperialism. In 1939, Feleo organized the United Peasant Center in Cabanatuan, Nueva Ecija, uniting peasants from Bulacan, Nueva Ecija, Tarlac, and Pampanga.

=== Second World War ===
By December 1941, with the Second World War looming, Feleo began organizing the peasantry of Nueva Ecija for guerrilla war. By March of the following year, he and other elements of the PKP, most notably Luis Taruc, met in Cabiao, Nueva Ecija to form the Hukbalahap, a guerrilla movement aimed at defending against the Japanese. Feleo was part of the military commissariat formed to ensure PKP control of the Huks.

The Huks were successful in wresting control from the Japanese in Central Luzon, forming local government units called Barrio United Defense Corps to maintain the peace and to act as a support structure for the Huk guerrillas. By 1945, the Huks have created provisional governments in the areas they controlled, and elected Feleo as the provisional governor of Nueva Ecija.

=== Post war and death ===
After the war, the KPMP and the Pampanga-based Aguman ding Maldang Talapagobra were reformed into the Pambansang Kaisahan ng mga Magbubukid. Feleo was appointed vice-president of the PKM. During this time, there was an impetus to have Feleo elected as governor of Nueva Ecija in the 1946 elections. However, there were no gubernatorial elections in 1946, and President Sergio Osmena did not appoint him as governor.

Feleo also involved himself the Democratic Alliance and as a spokesperson for Huk veterans during the post-war period, in addition to his PKM duties. His activities and activism, however, earned the ire of the land-owning elite. In September 1945, his house in Nueva Ecija was reportedly raided by military police. This, and other repressive practices by both the land-owning elites and the government in Central Luzon, contributed to growing unrest. A turning point was after the 1946 elections, when six Democratic Alliance candidates, including Luis Taruc, won seats in Congress but were not allowed to sit in session.

The Roxas administration decided to send the six DA candidates, along with peasant leaders such as Feleo and Mateo del Castillo to try and talk to peasant groups and pacify unrest, to little avail. Feleo claimed that civilian guards and government officials were "sabotaging the peace process".

On August 24, 1946, Feleo, on his way back to Manila after a pacification sortie in Cabiao, was stopped by a large band of "armed men in fatigue uniforms" in Gapan, Nueva Ecija. Feleo was accompanied by his bodyguards and four barrio lieutenants, and he had planned to present them to the Secretary of the Interior Jose Zulueta to testify that their barrios were shelled by government forces for no reason at all, forcing them to evacuate. Feleo and the four barrio officials were taken by the men and killed. Thousands of Huk veterans and PKM members were sure that Feleo was murdered by landlords, or possibly the Roxas administration itself.

As a direct result of Feleo's death, Luis Taruc issued the government an ultimatum before joining the Hukbalahap in rebellion against the government.
