= Waterloo Central School District =

School district in New York, United States

Location
- Waterloo, New York United States

District information
- Motto: Striving for Excellence
- Grades: K–12
- Established: 1950
- Superintendent: Sarah Cupelli.
- Schools: 4

Students and staff
- Teachers: 172
- Staff: 321

Other information
- Website: waterloocsd.org

Waterloo Central School District is a school district in Waterloo, New York, United States. The current superintendent is Sarah Cupelli.

The district operates four schools: Waterloo High School, Waterloo Middle School, LaFayette Intermediate School, and Skoi-Yase Primary School.

== Administration ==
The district offices are located at 109 Washington Street.

== History ==
Waterloo's school district began as individual schools located around the town's wards. Many of the schools were based in one-room schoolhouses, and totaled in 23 students. Following the advice of Waterloo Supervising Principal Albert Brown, voters approved the centralization of schools by a margin of 435 to 68 votes. All public schools from Waterloo and the nearby villages Seneca Falls, Tyre, Fayette, and Junius were brought in to the Waterloo Central district. The Central School was located at 202 West Main Street until enrollment caused the school to expand to other campuses. Until these buildings were completed, schools located at 5 East River Street and on Mill Street in Waterloo served as additional school buildings.

== Waterloo High School ==
Waterloo High School is located at 96 Stark Street and serves grades 9 through 12. The current principal is James Karcz.

=== History ===
Waterloo High School was originally known as "Waterloo Central School" and located on 202 West Main Street. In 1957, construction began on a new senior high school that was completed in time for the 1961 school year. Immediately, grades 9-12 began to be housed at the new building located on Center Street, while grades 7-8 remained on Main Street. Starting in 1966, the ninth grade was housed at Main Street until renovations could be made to the high school building to increase capacity. The Center Street building remained home to the high school until January 2006, when the school was moved into the brand new location on Stark Street.

== Waterloo Middle School ==
Waterloo Middle School
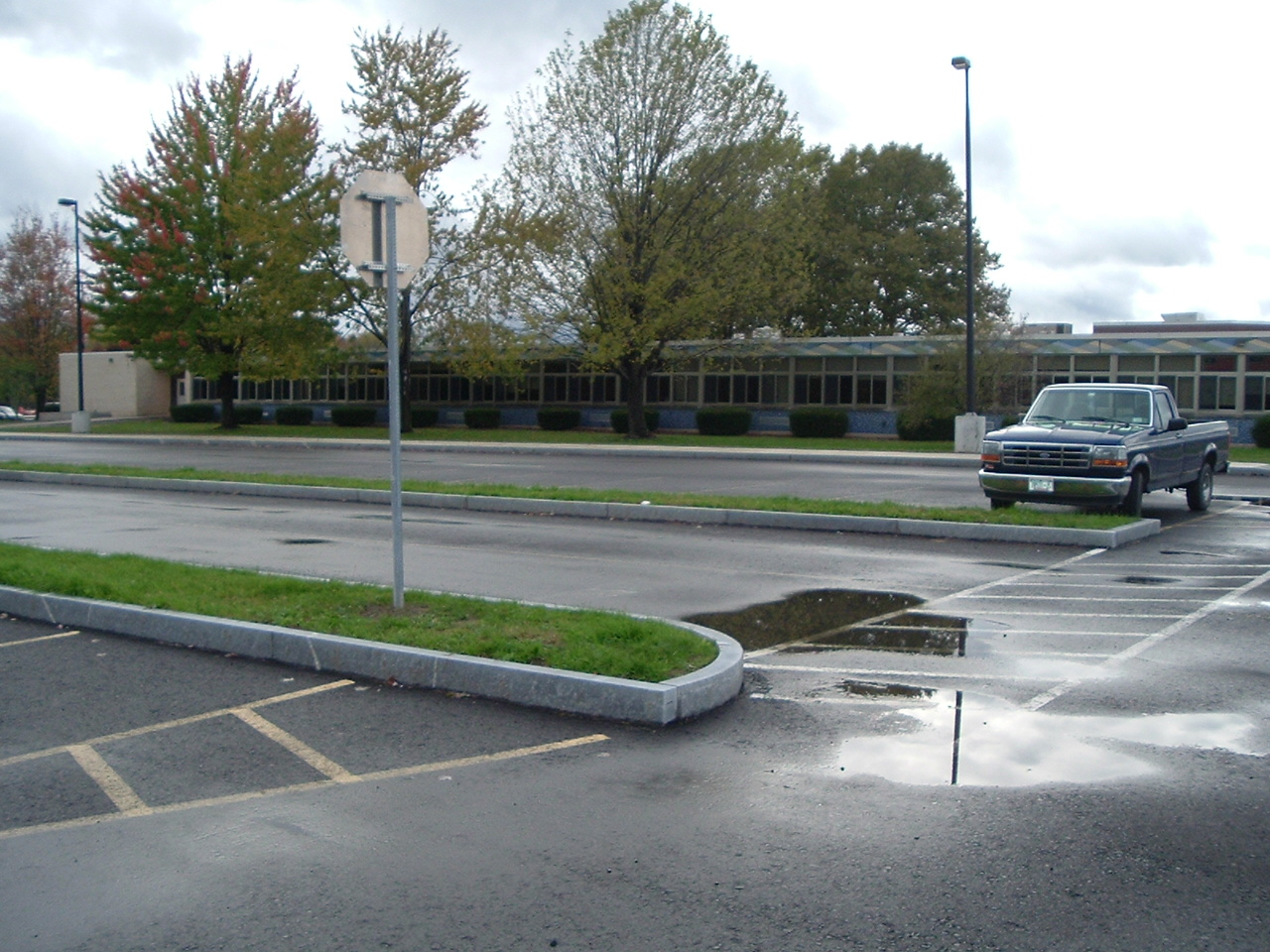

Location
- 65 Center Street

Information
- Motto: Academics and Character Together - "A Class Act"
- Principal: Vincent G. Vitale
- Grades: 6-8
- Website: wms.waterloocsd.org

Waterloo Middle School is located at 65 Center Street and serves grades 6 through 8. The current principal is Vincent Vitale. Waterloo Middle School was awarded the first National School of Character Award in 2008.

=== History ===
Waterloo Middle School was part of the Waterloo Central School until 1961, when the senior high grades moved to Center Street, and grades 7-8 remained at the Junior High building at 202 West Main Street. Grade 6 was part of the Middle School in the 1970s and 1980s. In the fall of 2006, Waterloo Middle School moved to the former High School on Center Street and is now adjacent to the new High School building.

== Lafayette Intermediate ==
LaFayette Intermediate School
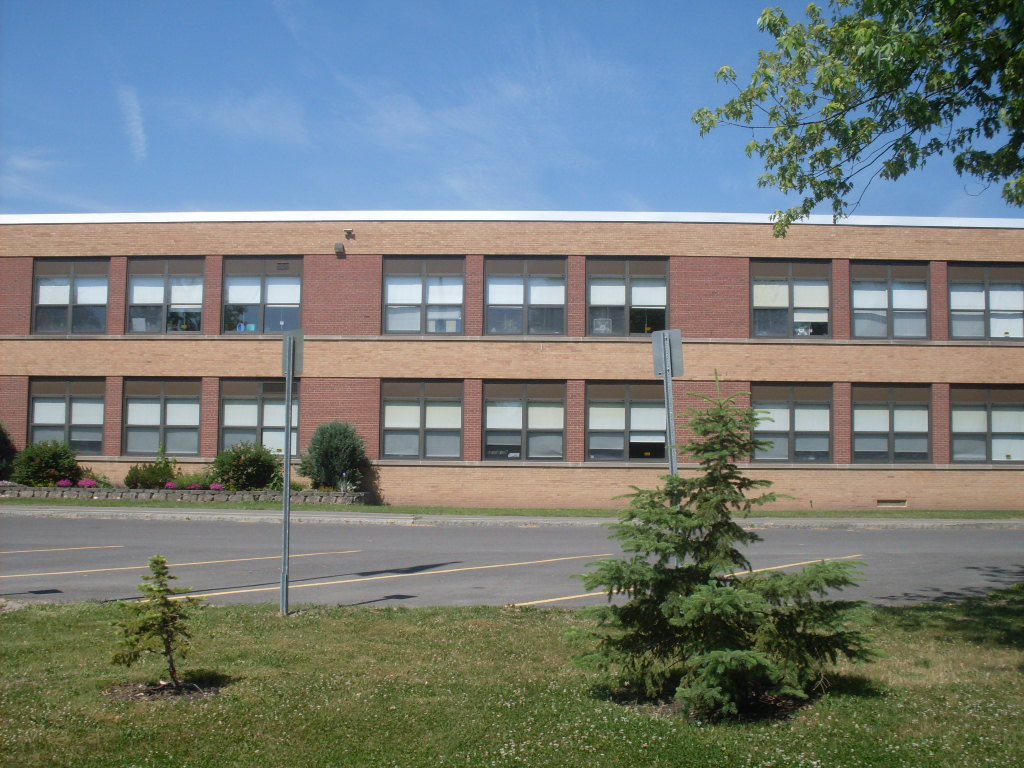

Location
- 71 Inslee Street

Information
- Motto: "Working Together as a Team to be People of Good Character!"
- Principal: Ms. Molly Lahr
- Grades: 3-5
- Website: lafayette.waterloocsd.org

Lafayette Intermediate School is located at 71 Inslee Street and serves grades 3 through 5. The current principal is Molly Lahr.

=== History ===
LaFayette was built in 1951 and served Grades K-5 for students in the northern half of the canal district in Waterloo. In the 1980s, the school's grades changed to meet enrollment demands, now offering Grades 3-5 for all students.

The building originally held two stories. In 2000, another wing on the western side of the school was constructed to build a new gymnasium and four new classrooms. The current layout of the school has the third and fourth grades as well as art classes on the second floor, while the fifth grade, library, music classrooms, and computer labs are also located on the main wing of the first floor.

The school has been recognized as a High Performing/Closing Gap School by New York State for several years.

== Skoi-Yase Primary ==
Skoi-Yase Primary School
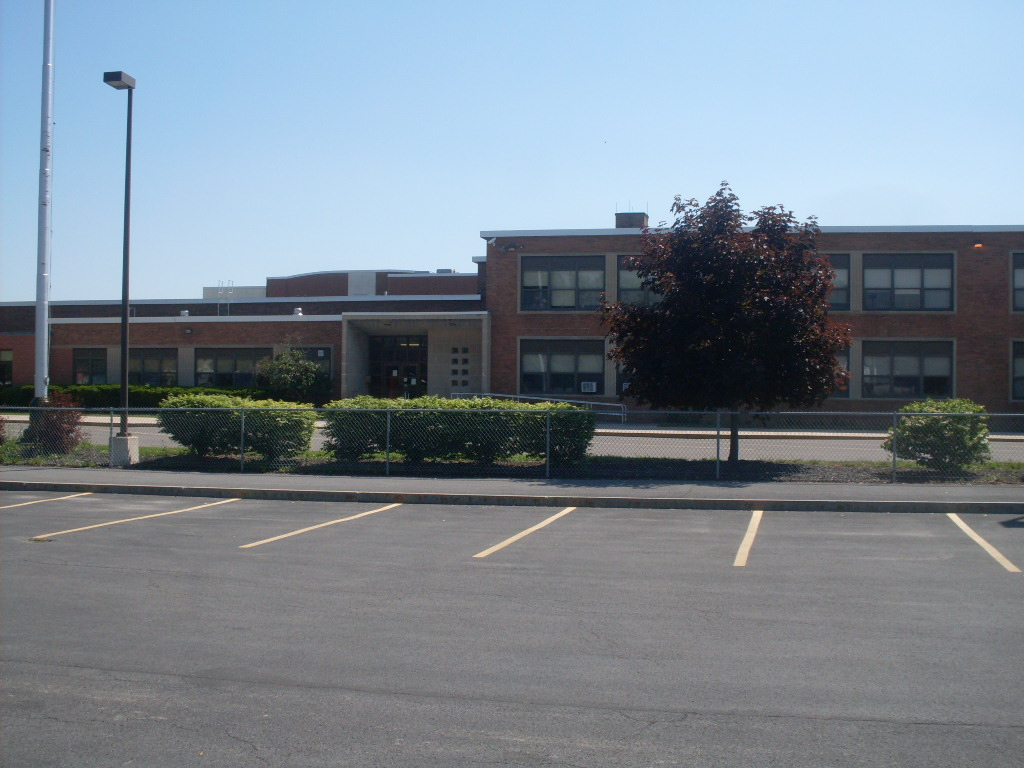

Location
- 65 Fayette Street

Information
- Motto: "Ready, Set, Grow"
- Principal: Mrs.Sarah Marchitell
- Grades: K-2
- Website: skoiyase.waterloocsd.org

Skoi-Yase School is located at 65 Fayette Street and serves grades K-2. The current principal is Mrs.Sarah Marchitell.

=== History ===
Skoi-Yase's construction was completed in 1953 and served grades 1-5 for Waterloo students located in the southern half of Waterloo's canal district. In the 1980s, the school changed to serve grades K through 2 for all Waterloo students. Originally, the building contained a two-story southern wing, and a western wing. The first floor of the southern wing contained the main office, gymnasium, art and music classrooms, library, and some kindergarten classrooms. The western wing contained more kindergarten classrooms, first grade classrooms, a large play room and a computer lab. The second floor held the entire second grade.

In 2000, a new wing was created off of the first floor of the southern wing. This wing contained kindergarten and first grade classrooms and a new gymnasium.

== Defunct schools ==
=== Main Street Elementary ===
Main Street Elementary
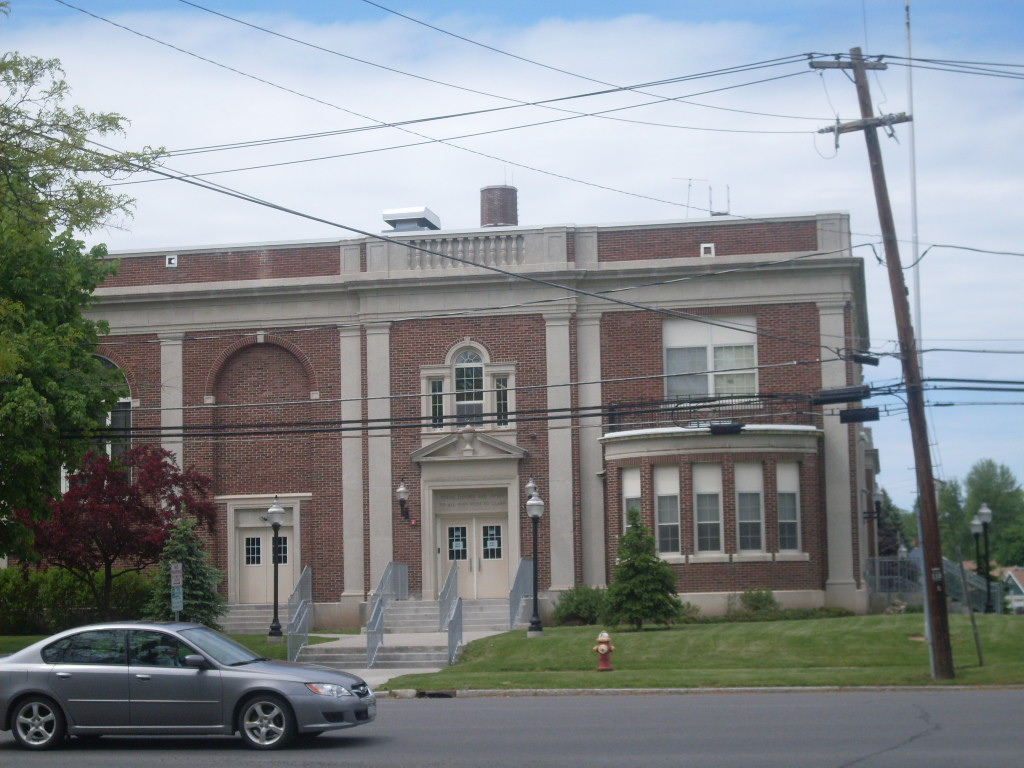

Location
- 202 West Main Street

Information
- Motto: "Children First"
- Grades: K-5

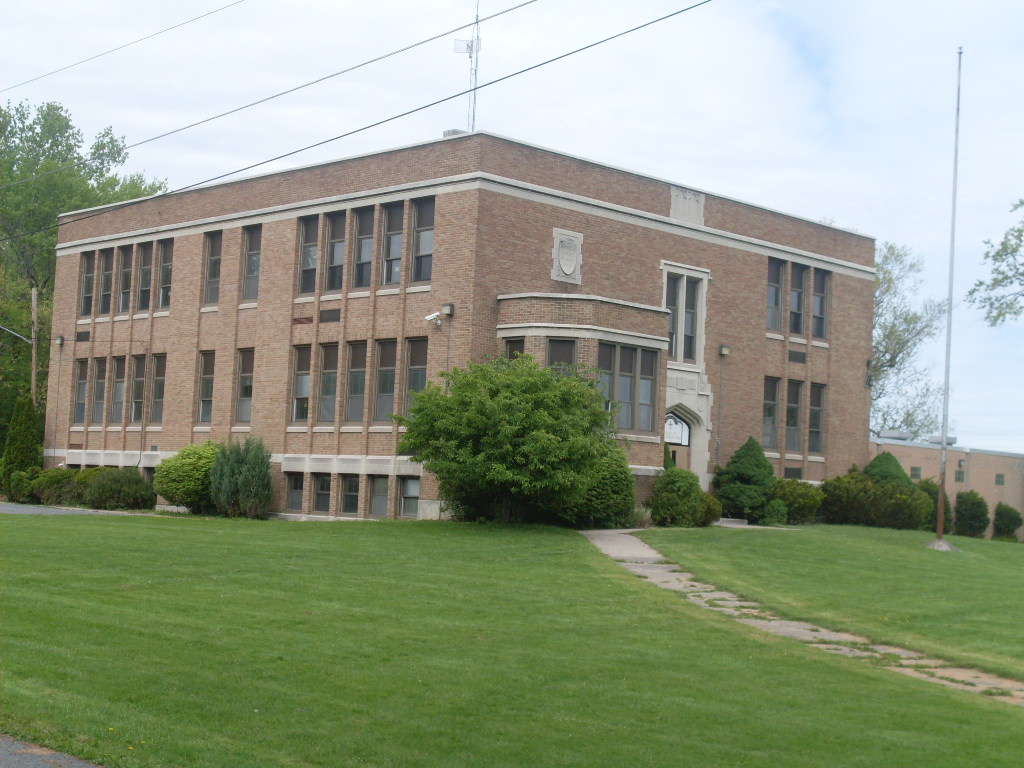
The Border City campus (1994–2006)

Main Street Elementary was a multi-age school located at 202 West Main Street and serves Grades K-5. The current principal is Mrs. Wendy Doyle. The school differed from LaFayette and Skoi Yase in that grades are instead known as "levels" in which students are placed for two consecutive years.

=== History ===
The school was formerly known as Border City Multi-Age School and was located on 125 Border City Road in Border City, New York, a small region connecting Waterloo and Geneva, New York. It was annexed by the Waterloo School District in 1994. Before being integrated into Waterloo, the school was known as the Border City Union Free School and served nearby students living in the Border City region. It moved to the current Main Street location, previously the Waterloo Middle School campus, in 2006. The school was closed in 2012 due to budget constraints.

The former Border City campus was sold by the Waterloo district is now used as headquarters for God's Church of Revealed Truth.
