= Women's International Motorcycle Association =

WIMA
- Abbreviation: WIMA
- Founded: 1950
- Founder: Louise Scherbyn
- Founded at: United States
- Type: Association
- Region served: Worldwide
- International President: Mihaela Hodvoianu (2025)
- Key people: Louise Scherbyn - Founder
- Website: www.wimaworld.com

The Women's International Motorcycle Association (WIMA) is a motorcycle women association established by Louise Scherbyn in 1950 in the United States. Branches began in many countries, including Great Britain (Theresa Wallach was the first international vice president) and Australia where the branch was started by Hazel Mayes. It was the first organization to recognize all women in the sport, and the first ever stand-alone women-led motorcycle association. Currently spanning 39 countries, it is purportedly the largest motorcycle association for women in the world. The group is known for organising annual "Pink Ribbon Rides" to raise awareness for breast cancer.

== National divisions ==
The national divisions in June 2026:

- Australia
- Austria
- Bangladesh
- Belgium
- Bulgaria
- Canada
- Curaçao
- Denmark
- Estonia
- Finland
- France
- Germany
- Great Britain
- Greece
- Hungary
- India
- Italy
- Iran
- Japan
- Korea
- Lithuania
- Luxembourg
- Mexico
- Malaysia
- Morocco
- Netherlands
- Nepal
- New Zealand
- Norway
- Pakistan
- Poland
- Romania
- Sweden
- Switzerland
- Thailand
- Ukraine
- United States

== Bibliography ==
- Easy Motorcycle Riding. Wallach, Theresa. New York, Sterling, 1970. ISBN 978-0806977126
- Iron Horse Cowgirls: Louise Scherbyn and the Women Motorcyclists of the 1930s and 1940s. Linda Back McKay and Kate St. Vincent Vogl. McFarland Books. ISBN 978-1476669465
- The Rugged Road. Theresa Wallach, Panther Publications, 2010 ISBN 978-0956497529
