= List of members of the House of Representatives of the Philippines (L) =

This is a complete list of past and present members of the House of Representatives of the Philippines whose last names begin with the letter L.

This list also includes members of the Philippine Assembly (1907–1916), the Commonwealth National Assembly (1935–1941), the Second Republic National Assembly (1943–1944) and the Batasang Pambansa (1978–1986).

== La ==
- Glona Labadlabad, member for Zamboanga del Norte's 2nd district (2016–2025)
- Irene Labadlabad, member for Zamboanga del Norte's 2nd district (2025–present)
- Rosendo Labadlabad, member for Zamboanga del Norte's 2nd district (2007–2016)
- Violeta Labaria, member for Bukidnon's 2nd district (1987–1992)
- Alejo Labrador, member for Zambales (1922–1928)
- Medina Lacson-de Leon, member for Bataan (1949–1953)
- Josephine Lacson-Noel, member for Malabon–Navotas (2009–2010), and Malabon (2010–2016, 2019–2025)
- Arsenio Lacson, member for Manila's 2nd district (1949–1952)
- Isaac Lacson, member for Negros Occidental's 3rd district (1925–1928)
- Jose Carlos Lacson, member for Negros Occidental's 3rd district (1987–1998, 2001–2010)
- Virgilio Lacson, member for Manila Teachers party-list (2016–2025)
- Ricardo Ladrido, member for Iloilo's 4th district (1949–1969)
- Danilo Lagbas, member for Misamis Oriental's 1st district (2004–2008)
- Antonio Lagdameo Jr., member for Davao del Norte's 2nd district (2007–2016)
- Monique Lagdameo, member for Makati's 1st district (2010–2016)
- Edcel Lagman, member for Albay's 1st district (1987–1998, 2004–2013, 2016–2025)
- Edcel Lagman Jr., member for Albay's 1st district (2013–2016)
- Eligio Lagman, member for Pampanga's 1st district (1935–1941, 1945–1946), and Pampanga (1943–1944)
- Krisel Lagman, member for Albay's 1st district (1998–2004)
- Daphne Lagon, member for Cebu's 6th district (2022–present)
- Sonny Lagon, member for Ako Bisaya party-list (2019–present)
- Salvador Laguda, member for Iloilo's 3rd district (1907–1909)
- Salvador S. Laguda, member for Negros Occidental's 1st district (1987–1992)
- Wenceslao Lagumbay, member for Laguna's 2nd district (1953–1965), and Laguna (1984–1986)
- Ananias Laico, member for Laguna's 2nd district (1925–1998)
- Alfredo Lamen, member for Mountain Province's 1st district (1962–1964, 1969–1972)
- Scott Davies Lanete, member for Masbate's 3rd district (2010–2019)
- Henry Lanot, member for Pasig (1998–2004)
- Macabangkit Lanto, member for Lanao del Norte's 2nd district (1992–1994)
- Dennis Laogan, member for Ang Kabuhayan party-list (2016–2019)
- Ramon Lapez, member for Bohol (1984–1986)
- Jeci Lapus, member for Tarlac's 3rd district (2007–2013)
- Jesli Lapus, member for Tarlac's 3rd district (1998–2006)
- Edgar Lara, member for Cagayan's 2nd district (1992–2001)
- Joseph Lara, member for Cagayan's 3rd district (2019–present)
- Gabriel Lasam, member for Cagayan's 2nd district (1907–1909)
- Manuel Laserna, member for Capiz's 3rd district (1925–1928)
- Minerva Laudico, sectoral member (1992–1998)
- Jose Laurel Jr., member for Batangas (1943–1944, 1984–1986), and Batangas's 3rd district (1945–1957, 1961–1972)
- Jose Laurel IV, member for Batangas's 3rd district (1957–1961, 1998–2001)
- Salvador Laurel, member for Region IV-A (1978–1984)
- Milagros Laurel-Trinidad, member for Batangas's 3rd district (1987–1998)
- Jesus Lava, member for Bulacan's 1st district (1946–1949)
- Francisco Lavides, member for Tayabas's 2nd district (1935–1941, 1945–1946)
- Manolet Lavides, member for Quezon's 4th district (1992–1995)
- Eulogio Lawenko, member for Albay's 1st district (1946–1949)
- Jaime C. Laya, Cabinet member (1978–1981)
- Rodolfo Layumas, member for Region VI (1978–1984)
- Carmelo Lazatin Sr., member for Pampanga's 1st district (1987–1998, 2007–2013)
- Carmelo Lazatin II, member for Pampanga's 1st district (2016–2025)
- Carmelo Lazatin Jr., member for Pampanga's 1st district (2025–present)
- Rafael Lazatin, member for Pampanga (1984–1986)
- Vicente Lazo, member for Ilocos Norte's 1st district (1931–1941, 1945–1946)

== Le ==
- Paulino Salvador Leachon, member for Oriental Mindoro's 1st district (2013–2022)
- Francisco Lecaroz, member for Marinduque (1957–1972)
- Carlos Ledesma, member for Iloilo's 2nd district (1909–1912)
- Julio Ledesma IV, member for Negros Occidental's 1st district (1995–2004, 2007–2016, 2025–present)
- Oscar Ledesma, member for Iloilo's 2nd district (1945–1949)
- Delphine Gan Lee, member for AGRI party-list (2013–2019)
- Wilbert T. Lee, member for AGRI party-list (2022–present)
- Nelson Legacion, member for Camarines Sur's 3rd district (2025–present)
- Antonio Legarda Jr., member for Antique (2022–present)
- Loren Legarda, member for Antique (2019–2022)
- Jose Legaspi, member for Aklan (1957–1961)
- Rafael Legaspi, member for Aklan (1965–1972, 1984–1986)
- Ramon Legaspi, member for Aklan (1987–1992)
- Valentino Legaspi, member for Region VII (1978–1984)
- Franz Vincent Legazpi, member for Pinoy Workers party-list (2025–2026)
- Karl Josef Legazpi, member for Pinoy Workers party-list (2026–present)
- Jose Leido Sr., member for Oriental Mindoro (1958–1961)
- Jose Leido Jr., member for Oriental Mindoro (1969–1972), and Region IV-A (1978–1984)
- Evelio Leonardia, member for Bacolod (2013–2016)
- Catalina Leonen-Pizzaro, member for ABS party-list (2009–2016)
- Jose Lerma, member for Bataan (1907–1909)
- Eulogio Lerum, sectoral member (1978–1986)
- Potenciano Lesaca, member for Zambales (1935–1938)
- Mariano Leuterio, member for Mindoro (1914–1922, 1925–1928, 1931–1932)
- Raul Leuterio, member for Mindoro (1934–1935, 1938–1941, 1943–1944, 1945–1951), and Oriental Mindoro (1951–1953)
- Charity Leviste, member for Oriental Mindoro's 1st district (2001–2004)
- Expedito Leviste, member for Batangas's 2nd district (1969–1972), and Region IV-A (1978–1984)
- Leandro Leviste, member for Batangas's 1st district (2025–present)
- Renato Leviste, member for Oriental Mindoro's 1st district (1992–2001)
- Jose Leyson, member for Cebu (1943–1944)

== Li ==
- Dante Liban, member for Quezon City's 2nd district (1992–2001)
- Marcelino Libanan, member for Eastern Samar (1998–2007), and 4Ps party-list (2022–present)
- Roan Libarios, member for Agusan del Norte's 2nd district (1998–2001)
- Isidro Lico, member for Ating Koop party-list (2010–2013)
- Benjamin Ligot, member for Cagayan's 2nd district (1957–1969)
- Aloysia Lim, member for RAM party-list (2019–2022)
- Benjamin Lim, member for Pangasinan's 4th district (1998–2001)
- Marciano Lim, member for Samar's 2nd district (1953–1957)
- Pacifico Lim, member for Sorsogon's 1st district (1946–1949)
- Reno Lim, member for Albay's 3rd district (2007–2010)
- Roseller T. Lim, member for Zamboanga (1949–1953), and Zamboanga del Sur (1953–1957)
- Teodoro Lim, member for UNI-MAD party-list (2009–2010)
- Eliseo Limsiaco, member for Negros Occidental's 3rd district (1922–1925, 1946–1949)
- Joaquin Linao, member for Bataan (1943–1944)
- Emigdio Lingad, member for Pampanga (1984–1986), and Pampanga's 2nd district (1987–1995)
- Jose B. Lingad, member for Pampanga's 1st district (1969–1972)
- Pedro Liongson, member for Pampanga's 1st district (1922–1928)
- Juan Liwag, member for Region III (1978–1983)
- Enrique Lizardo, member for Batanes (1992–1995)
- Mariano Lizardo, member for Batanes (1928–1934)

== Ll ==
- Higino Llaguno Jr., member for Surigao del Sur (1984–1986)
- Brian Poe Llamanzares, member for FPJ Panday Bayanihan party-list (2025–present)
- Antonio Llamas, member for Bataan (1922–1925, 1945–1946)
- Cresente Llorente Jr., member for Zamboanga del Norte's 2nd district (1995–1998)
- Ricardo Lloret, member for Bulacan's 2nd district (1916–1919)
- Salvador Lluch, member for Lanao (1945–1946)

== Lo ==
- Celso Lobregat, member for Zamboanga City (1998–2004), and Zamboanga City's 1st district (2013–2019)
- Maria Clara Lobregat, member for Zamboanga City (1987–1998)
- Carmelo Locsin, member for Leyte's 4th district (1987–1998)
- José Locsín, member for Negros Occidental's 1st district (1928–1931)
- Jose E. Locsin, member for Iloilo's 3rd district (1919–1922)
- Julian Locsin, member for Albay's 1st district (1931–1934)
- Leopoldo Locson, member for Region VI (1978–1984)
- Mariano Locsin, member for Albay's 2nd district (1912–1916), and Albay (1943–1944)
- Maria Victoria Locsin, member for Leyte's 4th district (1998–2002)
- Teodoro Locsin Jr., member for Makati's 1st district (2001–2010)
- Vicente Locsin, member for Negros Oriental's 2nd district (1907–1909)
- Mariano Logarta, member for Region VII (1978–1984)
- Vicente Logarta, member for Cebu's 2nd district (1946–1949)
- Adriano Lomuntad, member for Samar's 3rd district (1946–1949)
- Vicente Lontok, member for Batangas's 1st district (1919–1922)
- Guardson Lood, member for Region IX (1978–1984), and Zamboanga del Norte (1984–1986)
- Hussin Loong, member for Region IX (1978–1984), and Sulu (1984–1986)
- Tupay Loong, member for Sulu's 1st district (2010–2016)
- Alberto Lopez, member for Iloilo's 2nd district (1987–1998)
- Benhur Lopez Jr., member for YACAP party-list (2016–2019)
- Carlo Lopez, member for Manila's 2nd district (2010–2019)
- Carol Jane Lopez, member for YACAP party-list (2008–2016)
- Elias Lopez, member for Davao City's 3rd district (1992–1998)
- Emily Relucio Lopez, member for Guimaras (1998–2001)
- Jaime Lopez, member for Manila's 2nd district (1987–1998, 2001–2010)
- Jose Antonio Lopez, member for Marino party-list (2019)
- Luis Lopez, member for Batangas's 1st district (1963–1965)
- Manny Lopez, member for Manila's 1st district (2016–2022)
- Maria Cristina Lopez, member for ALONA party-list (2025–present)
- Mel Lopez, member for Manila (1984–1986)
- Natalio Lopez, member for Batangas's 1st district (1935–1938)
- Pedro Lopez, member for Cebu's 2nd district (1945–1946, 1953–1957)
- Ramon Lopez, member for Iloilo's 5th district (1909–1912)
- Ruy Elias Lopez, member for Davao City's 3rd district (1998–2007)
- Rafael Lopez Vito, member for Iloilo City (1987–1995)
- Pablo Lorenzo, member for Mindanao and Sulu (1917–1925)
- Victorio Lorenzo, member for Nueva Ecija's 4th district (1992–1995)
- Eriberto Loreto, member for Leyte's 5th district (1987–1998)
- Caloy Loria, member for Albay's 2nd district (2025–present)
- Artemio Loyola, member for Davao del Sur (1967–1972)
- Dahlia Loyola, member for Cavite's 5th district (2019–2022)
- Roy Loyola, member for Cavite's 5th district (2010–2019, 2022–present)
- Sergio Loyola, member for Manila's 3rd district (1965–1969)
- Jose Apolinario Lozada, member for Negros Occidental's 5th district (1998–2004)
- Vicente Lozada, member for Cebu's 6th district (1909–1916)
- Crescenciano Lozano, member for Iloilo's 2nd district (1916–1925)

== Lu ==
- Cayetano Lucero, member for Samar (1943–1944)
- Juan Lucero, member for La Union's 1st district (1916–1922)
- Santiago Lucero, member for Cebu's 6th district (1953–1957)
- Wilmar Lucero, member for Northern Samar's 2nd district (1992–1998)
- Andres Luciano, member for Pampanga's 2nd district (1912–1916)
- Leonor Ines Luciano, sectoral member (1994–1998)
- Rashid Lucman, member for Lanao del Sur (1961–1969)
- Jose Lugay, member for Samar's 3rd district (1916–1922)
- Gerville Luistro, member for Batangas's 2nd district (2022–present)
- Agustin Lukban, member for Camarines Norte (1928–1931)
- Cayetano Lukban, member for Rizal's 1st district (1907–1909)
- Justo Lukban, member for Manila's 1st district (1908–1911)
- Miguel Lukban, member for Camarines Norte (1931–1934)
- Macario Lumain, member for Bohol's 2nd district (1916–1922)
- Gualberto Lumauig, member for Region II (1978–1984), and Ifugao (1987–1992)
- Romulo Lumauig, member for Ifugao (1969–1972)
- Ed Lumayag, member for South Cotabato's 1st district (2022–present)
- Joaquin Luna, member for La Union's 1st district (1909–1916)
- Jose Lino Luna, member for Rizal's 1st district (1909–1912)
- Juan L. Luna, member for Mindoro (1922–1925, 1928–1934, 1935–1938)
- Tomas Luna, member for Albay's 3rd district (1916–1919)
- Macnell Lusotan, member for Marino party-list (2019–2022)
- Tiburcio Lutero, member for Iloilo's 4th district (1914–1919), and Iloilo's 3rd district (1945–1949)
