= Legislative districts of Oriental Mindoro =

Legislative district of the Philippines

The legislative districts of Oriental Mindoro are the representations of the province of Oriental Mindoro in the various national legislatures of the Philippines. The province is currently represented in the lower house of the Congress of the Philippines through its first and second congressional districts.

== History ==
Prior to gaining separate representation, areas now under the jurisdiction of Oriental Mindoro were represented under the lone district of the undivided Mindoro Province from 1898 to 1951.

The enactment of Republic Act No. 505 on June 13, 1950 split the old Mindoro Province into Occidental Mindoro and Oriental Mindoro, and provided each of them separate representation in Congress. Pursuant to Section 6 of Republic Act No. 505, the incumbent representative of Mindoro began to represent only Oriental Mindoro in the second half of the 2nd Congress, following the election of Occidental Mindoro's separate representative in a special election held on the same day as the 1951 senatorial elections.

Oriental Mindoro was represented in the Interim Batasang Pambansa as part of Region IV-A from 1978 to 1984, and returned two representatives, elected at large, to the Regular Batasang Pambansa in 1984.

Under the new Constitution which was proclaimed on February 11, 1987, the province was reapportioned into two congressional districts; each elected its member to the restored House of Representatives starting that same year.

== Current districts ==
Legislative Districts and Congressional Representatives of Oriental Mindoro
District	Current Representative	Party	Municipalities	Population (2020)	Area
1st	Arnan Panaligan (since 2022); Calapan	Lakas	List: Baco; Calapan; Naujan; Pola; Puerto Galera; San Teodoro; Socorro; Victoria	515,487	2,015.19 km^{2}
2nd	Alfonso Umali Jr. (since 2019); Bongabong	Liberal	List: Bansud; Bongabong; Bulalacao; Gloria; Mansalay; Pinamalayan; Roxas	422,852	223.19 km^{2}

== Defunct districts ==
=== Lone District (defunct) ===
Period	Representative
2nd Congress; 1949–1953	see Lone district of Mindoro
2nd Congress; 1949–1953	Raul Leuterio (Note: Elected in 1949 as representative of undivided Mindoro Province; began to serve as the representative of Oriental Mindoro beginning in the second half of the 2nd Congress, after the election of a separate representative for Occidental Mindoro in 1951, pursuant to R.A. 505.)
3rd Congress; 1953–1957	Conrado M. Morente
4th Congress; 1957–1961	Jose Leido, Sr.
5th Congress; 1961–1965	Luciano A. Joson
6th Congress; 1965–1969	Luciano A. Joson
7th Congress; 1969–1972	Jose J. Leido, Jr.

=== At-Large (defunct) ===
Period	Representatives
Regular Batasang Pambansa; 1984–1986	Rolleo L. Ignacio
Regular Batasang Pambansa; 1984–1986	Jose Reynaldo V. Morente

== See also ==
- Legislative district of Mindoro
