= Legislative districts of Occidental Mindoro =

Legislative district of the Philippines

The legislative districts of Occidental Mindoro are the representations of the province of Occidental Mindoro in the various national legislatures of the Philippines. The province is currently represented in the lower house of the Congress of the Philippines through its lone congressional district.

== History ==
Prior to gaining separate representation, areas now under the jurisdiction of Occidental Mindoro were represented under the lone district of the undivided Mindoro Province from 1898 to 1951.

The enactment of Republic Act No. 505 on June 13, 1950 split the old Mindoro Province into Occidental Mindoro and Oriental Mindoro, and provided each of them separate representation in Congress. Pursuant to Section 6 of R.A. 505, the incumbent representative of Mindoro continued to serve the entire province until Occidental Mindoro's separate representative was elected in a special election held on the same day as the 1951 senatorial elections.

Occidental Mindoro was represented in the Interim Batasang Pambansa as part of Region IV-A from 1978 to 1984, and returned one representative, elected at large, to the Regular Batasang Pambansa in 1984.

Under the new Constitution which was proclaimed on February 11, 1987, the province constituted a lone congressional district, and elected its member to the restored House of Representatives starting that same year.

Beginning in 2019, the districts used in appropriation of members is coextensive with the legislative districts of Occidental Mindoro. Prior to 2019 while the province was just one congressional district, the Commission on Elections divided the province into two provincial board districts.

== Current districts ==
Legislative Districts and Congressional Representatives of Occidental Mindoro
District	Current Representative	Party	Population (2020)	Area
Lone	Leody Tarriela (since 2022); Looc	PFP	525,354	5,865.71 km^{2}

== See also ==
- Legislative district of Mindoro
