= Legislative districts of Mindoro =

The legislative district of Mindoro was the representation of the historical province of Mindoro in the various national legislatures of the Philippines until 1951. The undivided province's representation encompassed the present-day provinces of Occidental Mindoro and Oriental Mindoro.

== History ==
Mindoro initially comprised a lone district for the purposes of electing representatives to the First Philippine Assembly in 1907. When seats for the upper house of the Philippine Legislature were elected from territory-based districts between 1916 and 1935, the province formed part of the fifthsenatorial district which elected two out of the 24-member Senate.

During the Second World War, two delegates represented Surigao in the National Assembly of the Japanese-sponsored Second Philippine Republic: one was the provincial governor (an ex officio member), while the other was elected through a provincial assembly of KALIBAPI members during the Japanese occupation of the Philippines. Upon the restoration of the Philippine Commonwealth in 1945, the province continued to constitute a single representative district.

The enactment of Republic Act No. 505 on 13 June 1950 split Mindoro into Occidental Mindoro and Oriental Mindoro, and provided each province separate representation in Congress. Pursuant to Section 6 of R.A. 505, the incumbent representative of Mindoro began to represent only Oriental Mindoro in the second half of the 2nd Congress, following the election of Occidental Mindoro's separate representative in a special election held on the same day as the 1951 senatorial elections.

== Lone District (defunct) ==
Period	Representative
1st Philippine Legislature; 1907–1909	Macario Adriatico^{1}
2nd Philippine Legislature; 1909–1912	Macario Adriatico^{1}
3rd Philippine Legislature; 1912–1916	Macario Adriatico^{1}
3rd Philippine Legislature; 1912–1916	Mariano P. Leuterio^{2}
4th Philippine Legislature; 1916–1919	Mariano P. Leuterio^{2}
5th Philippine Legislature; 1919–1922	Mariano P. Leuterio^{2}
6th Philippine Legislature; 1922–1925	Juan L. Luna
7th Philippine Legislature; 1925–1928	Mariano P. Leuterio
8th Philippine Legislature; 1928–1931	Juan L. Luna
9th Philippine Legislature; 1931–1934	Mariano P. Leuterio^{3}
9th Philippine Legislature; 1931–1934	Juan L. Luna^{4}
10th Philippine Legislature; 1934–1935	Raul Leuterio
1st National Assembly; 1935–1938	Juan L. Luna
2nd National Assembly; 1938–1941	Raul Leuterio^{1}
1st Commonwealth Congress; 1941–1946	Raul Leuterio^{1}
1st Congress; 1946–1949	Raul Leuterio^{1}
2nd Congress; 1949–1953	Raul Leuterio^{1}
2nd Congress; 1949–1953	see Lone districts of Occidental Mindoro and Oriental Mindoro

^1 Resigned on 1 March 1914.
^2 Assumed office after winning special election held on 8 June 1914; served for the remainder of the 3rd Legislature.
^3 Died on 23 April 1932.
^4 Assumed office after winning special election held on 4 June 1932; served for the remainder of the 9th Legislature.
^5 Elected in 1949 as representative of Mindoro Province; began to serve as the representative of Oriental Mindoro beginning in the second half of the 2nd Congress, after the election of a separate representative for Occidental Mindoro in 1951, pursuant to R.A. 505.

== At-Large (defunct) ==
Period	Representatives
National Assembly; 1943–1944	Raul Leuterio
National Assembly; 1943–1944	Felipe S. Abeleda (ex officio)

== See also ==
- Legislative district of Occidental Mindoro
- Legislative district of Oriental Mindoro
