= Oriental Mindoro's at-large congressional district =

Legislative district of the Philippines

Oriental Mindoro's at-large congressional district is a former congressional district that encompassed the area of Oriental Mindoro in the Philippines. It was represented in the House of Representatives from 1952 to 1972 and in the Regular Batasang Pambansa from 1984 to 1986. The province of Oriental Mindoro was created as a result of the partition of Mindoro in 1950 and elected its first representative provincewide at-large during the 1953 Philippine House of Representatives elections. Raul Leuterio, who served as representative of Mindoro's at-large congressional district during the partition was this district's first representative upon the election of a representative for Occidental Mindoro on January 25, 1952. The district remained a single-member district until the dissolution of the lower house in 1972. It was later absorbed by the multi-member Region IV-A's at-large district for the national parliament in 1978. In 1984, provincial and city representations were restored, and Oriental Mindoro elected two members for the regular parliament. The district was abolished following the 1987 reapportionment under a new constitution.

== Representation history ==
#	Term of office		Congress	Single seat							
#	Start	End	Congress	Image	Member	Party	Electoral history				
=== Oriental Mindoro's at-large district for the House of Representatives of the Philippines ===
District created June 13, 1950 from Mindoro's at-large district.
1	January 28, 1952	December 30, 1953	2nd		Raul Leuterio	Liberal	Redistricted from Mindoro's at-large district.				
2	December 30, 1953	December 30, 1957	3rd		Conrado M. Morente	Democratic	Elected in 1953.				
3	December 30, 1957	December 30, 1961	4th		José A. Leido Sr.	Nacionalista	Elected in 1957.				
4	December 30, 1961	December 30, 1969	5th		Luciano A. Joson	Liberal	Elected in 1961.				
4	December 30, 1961	December 30, 1969	6th		Luciano A. Joson	Liberal	Re-elected in 1965.				
5	December 30, 1969	September 23, 1972	7th		José J. Leido Jr.	Nacionalista	Elected in 1969. Removed from office after imposition of martial law.				
District dissolved into the twenty-seat Region IV-A's at-large district for the Interim Batasang Pambansa.
#	Term of office		Batasang Pambansa	Seat A				Seat B			
#	Start	End	Batasang Pambansa	Image	Member	Party	Electoral history	Image	Member	Party	Electoral history
=== Oriental Mindoro's at-large district for the Regular Batasang Pambansa ===
District re-created February 1, 1984.
–	July 23, 1984	March 25, 1986	2nd		Rolleo L. Ignacio	UNIDO	Elected in 1984.		Jose Reynaldo V. Morente	KBL	Elected in 1984.
District dissolved into Oriental Mindoro's 1st and 2nd districts.

== See also ==
- Legislative districts of Oriental Mindoro
