= Augurio Abeto =

Filipino politician and essayist (1904–1977)

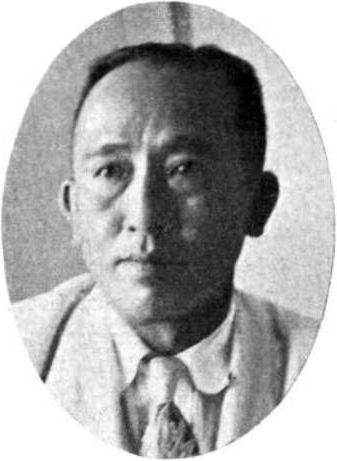
- Abeto official portrait during the 2nd Congress.

Member of the Philippine House of Representatives from Negros Occidental's 3rd district
- In office December 30, 1949 – December 30, 1953
- Preceded by: Eliseo Limsiaco
- Succeeded by: Agustín Gatuslao

Personal details
- Born: Augurio Marañon Abeto; January 21, 1904 Binalbagan, Negros Occidental, Philippine Islands
- Died: January 27, 1977 (aged 73)
- Party: Liberal
- Education: University of Santo Tomas

Augurio Marañon Abeto (January 21, 1904 – January 27, 1977) was an essayist in Hiligaynon during the Golden Age of Hiligaynon Literature. He was also a lawyer and politician, serving as a Municipal President (modern equivalent to Mayor) during 1940s and the representative for Negros Occidental's 3rd district from 1949 to 1953.

He is the composer of the Visayan song, Dalawidaw.

House of Representatives of the Philippines
Preceded by Eliseo Limsiaco	Representative, Negros Occidental's 3rd District; 1949–1953	Succeeded by Agustín Gatuslao
