= Mambusao =

Municipality in Capiz, Philippines

- Municipality
- Municipality of Mambusao
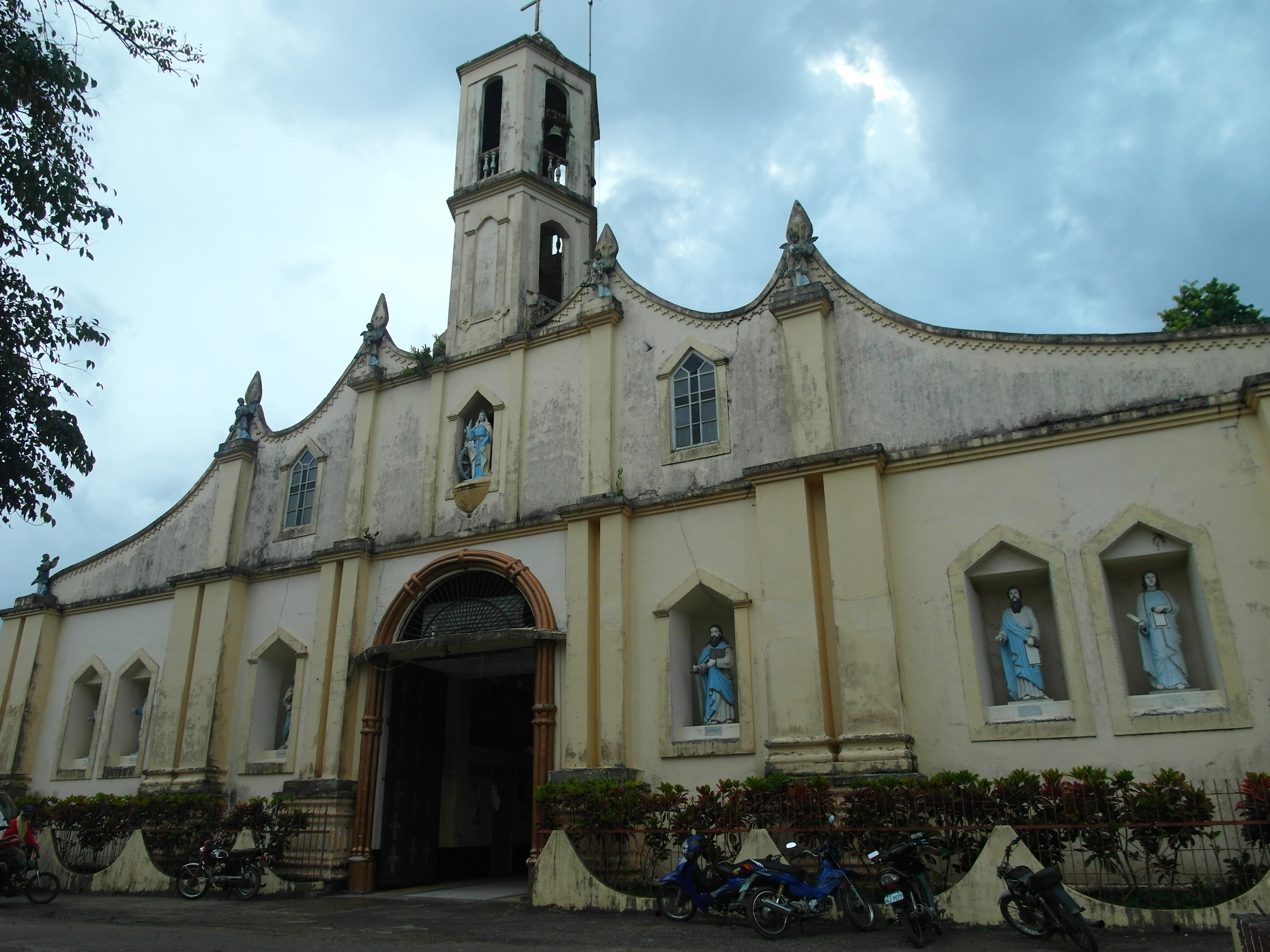
- Church of Mambusao (St. Catherine of Alexandria Parish Church)

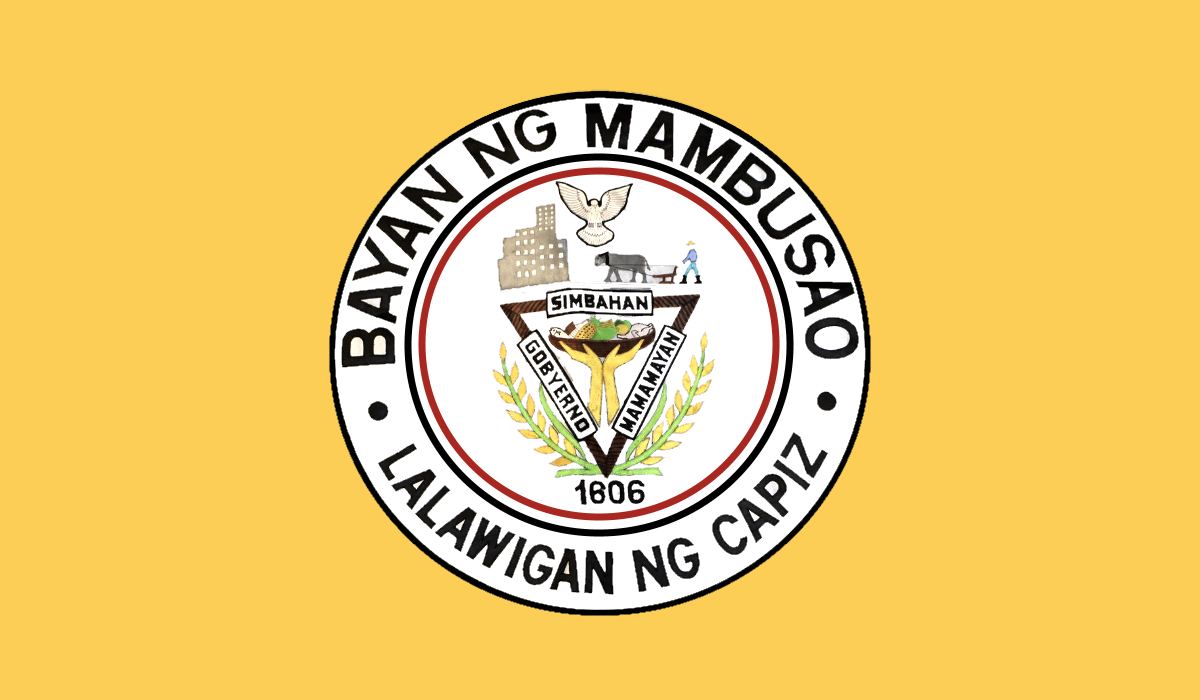
- Flag

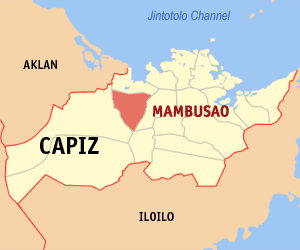
- Map of Capiz with Mambusao highlighted
- Interactive map of Mambusao
- Location within the Philippines
- Coordinates: 11°25′48″N 122°35′43″E
- Country: Philippines
- Region: Western Visayas
- Province: Capiz
- District: 2nd district
- Founded: 1606
- Barangays: 26 (see Barangays

Government
  - Type: Sangguniang Bayan
  - Mayor: Leodegario A. Labao, Jr. (PDP)
  - Vice Mayor: Richard L. Buenavista (PDP)
  - Representative: Jane T. Castro (Lakas)
  - Municipal Council: Members: Mary Ann D. Labao; Catherine L. Villaester; Raul L. Ticar; Joefred Sheen A. Jumbas; John V. Laurilla; Fatima T. Trajano; Jeffrey L. Layo; Maria Rhodora B. Uy
  - Electorate: 28,901 voters (2025)

Area
  - Total: 136.91 km^{2} (52.86 sq mi)
- Elevation: 42 m (138 ft)
- Highest elevation: 253 m (830 ft)
- Lowest elevation: 8 m (26 ft)

Population (2024 census)
  - Total: 41,768
  - Density: 305.08/km^{2} (790.14/sq mi)
  - Households: 10,275

Economy
  - Income class: 2nd municipal income class
  - Poverty incidence: 12% (2023)
  - Revenue: ₱ 197.3 million (2024)
  - Assets: ₱ 687.8 million (2024)
  - Expenditure: ₱ 169.5 million (2024)
  - Liabilities: ₱ 263.8 million (2024)

Service provider
  - Electricity: Capiz Electric Cooperative (CAPELCO)
- Time zone: UTC+8 (PST)
- ZIP code: 5807
- PSGC: 061908000
- IDD : area code: +63 (0)36
- Native languages: Capisnon; Hiligaynon; Tagalog

Mambusao, officially the Municipality of Mambusao (Capiznon/Hiligaynon: Banwa sang Mambusao; Tagalog: Bayan ng Mambusao), is a municipality in the province of Capiz, Philippines. According to the 2024 census, it has a population of 41,768 people.

It is known for its natural scenery, local traditions, and welcoming community. It offers a relaxed setting with outdoor spots, local food, and heritage sites such as old churches and ancestral homes. The 1818 Spanish census showed that there were 1,926 native families and 18 Spanish-Filipino families flourishing here.

== Etymology ==
The name Mambusao comes from a Hiligaynon word meaning “to carry.” It is linked to the river’s past role as a route for moving people and goods within the area.

== Geography ==
It is 36 kilometres (22 mi) from Roxas City.

=== Barangays ===
Mambusao is politically subdivided into 26 barangays. Each barangay consists of puroks and some have sitios.

- Atiplo
- Balat-an
- Balit
- Batiano
- Bating
- Bato Bato
- Baye
- Bergante
- Bunga
- Bula
- Bungsi
- Burias
- Caidquid
- Cala-agus
- Libo-o
- Manibad
- Maralag
- Najus-an
- Pangpang Norte
- Pangpang Sur
- Pinay
- Poblacion Proper
- Poblacion Tabuc
- Sinondojan
- Tugas
- Tumalalud

=== Climate ===
Climate data for Mambusao, Capiz
Month	Jan	Feb	Mar	Apr	May	Jun	Jul	Aug	Sep	Oct	Nov	Dec	Year
Mean daily maximum °C (°F)	27 (81)	28 (82)	29 (84)	31 (88)	32 (90)	31 (88)	30 (86)	30 (86)	29 (84)	29 (84)	29 (84)	27 (81)	29 (85)
Mean daily minimum °C (°F)	23 (73)	23 (73)	23 (73)	24 (75)	25 (77)	25 (77)	24 (75)	24 (75)	24 (75)	24 (75)	24 (75)	23 (73)	24 (75)
Average precipitation mm (inches)	61 (2.4)	39 (1.5)	46 (1.8)	48 (1.9)	90 (3.5)	144 (5.7)	152 (6.0)	145 (5.7)	163 (6.4)	160 (6.3)	120 (4.7)	90 (3.5)	1,258 (49.4)
Average rainy days	12.3	9.0	9.9	10.0	18.5	25.0	27.4	26.0	25.9	24.9	17.9	14.2	221
Source: Meteoblue

== Demographics ==
Population census of Mambusao
Year	Pop.	±% p.a.
1903	8,225	—
1918	11,913	+2.50%
1939	15,723	+1.33%
1948	18,619	+1.90%
1960	19,504	+0.39%
1970	24,530	+2.32%
1975	28,129	+2.78%
1980	32,097	+2.67%
1990	33,213	+0.34%
1995	35,632	+1.33%
2000	36,793	+0.69%
2007	37,498	+0.26%
2010	37,672	+0.17%
2015	39,644	+0.98%
2020	40,690	+0.55%
2024	41,768	+0.63%
Source: Philippine Statistics Authority

In the 2024 census, the population of Mambusao was 41,768 people, with a density of 310 inhabitants per square kilometre or 800 inhabitants per square mile.

== Economy ==
Poverty incidence of Mambusao (%)

Source: Philippine Statistics Authority

The economy is based on agriculture with rice and coconut as the primary products and crops.

== Culture ==
The annual festival is called Inilusan honoring of St. Catherine of Alexandria, the patron saint of the town, celebrated every November 25. Inilusan literally means sharing of dish by neighbors.

== Education ==
There are two schools district offices which govern all educational institutions within the municipality. They oversee the management and operations of all private and public, from primary to secondary schools. These are the:

- Mambusao East Schools District
- Mambusao West Schools District

Primary and elementary schools

- Angelo Llorente Elementary School
- Atiplo Elementary School
- Balat-an Elementary School
- Balit Elementary School
- Batiano Elementary School
- Burias Elementary School
- Caidquid Elementary School
- Diosdado Bayot Elementary School
- Doane Baptist Early Childhood Education
- Gavino M. Navarra Elementary School
- Baye Elementary School
- Bergante Elementary School
- Bungsi Elementary School
- Cala-agus Elementary School
- Eusebio Villareal Memorial School
- Ilawod Elementary School
- Juan Andaya Elementary School
- Libo-o Primary School
- Malogo Elementary School
- Mambusao Christian Center Academy
- Mambusao Elementary School
- Mambusao Seventh-Day Adventist Preparatory School
- Manibad Elementary School
- Minoro Elementary School
- Najus-an Elementary School
- Pangpang Norte Elementary School
- Pangpang Sur Primary School
- Pinay Elementary School
- Ramon A. Villareal Memorial School
- Shekhinah Institute
- Sinondojan Primary School
- Tongatong Elementary School
- Tugas Elementary School
- Tumalalud Elementary School

Secondary schools

- Agkawayan Integrated School
- Bula Integrated School
- Capiz State University (High School)
- David Moises Memorial High School
- Mambusao East National High School
- Mambusao National High School

Higher educational institution

- Capiz State University

== Notable personalities ==
- Sonny Lagon (b. 1969), Engineer, elected member of Ako Bisaya party list
- Salvador Laguda (1872–1931), Lawyer and politician, member of the Philippine Assembly from 1907 to 1909
- Roy Señeres (1947–2016), Politician and diplomat
- Cornelio Villareal (1904–1992), Lawyer and politician, served as house speaker from 1962 to 1967
