= Ako Bisaya =

Party-list in the Philippines

- — Philippine partylist —
- Founded: 2011; 15 years ago
- COMELEC accreditation: 2018; 8 years ago
- Headquarters: Central Visayas
- Ideology: Visayan regionalism
- Colors: Blue

Current representation (20th Congress)
- Seats in the House of Representatives: 1 / 3 (Out of 63 party-list seats)
- Representative(s): Sonny Lagon

Ako Bisaya (stylized as AKO Bisaya; lit. 'I am Bisaya') is a political organization with representation in the House of Representatives of the Philippines.

== Background ==
Ako Bisaya is a political organization established in 2011 and is based in Central Visayas. Its stated constituents in the House of Representatives are the Visayan people. Ako Bisaya aims to facilitate the preservation of the Visayan culture and tradition and provide skills training and financial assistance especially for indigents.

== History ==
=== 18th Congress ===
It participated in the 2019 elections where it won a single seat for the 18th Congress. The seat was filled in by Sonny Lagon, a native of Mambusao, Capiz who is an engineer and a cockfighter. It received support from various politicians

Among Lagon's actions during the 18th Congress include proposing a measure that would recognize January as the Visayan Heritage Month, and a bill mandating cash aid to senior citizens if they reach certain age milestones.

=== 19th Congress ===
Ako Bisaya participated in the 2022 elections and retained a seat in the House of Representatives. Lagon's wife Daphne Lagon was the group's first nominee while Joannes Alegado, mayor of Consolacion, was the second nominee.

== Electoral history ==
Election	Votes	%	Seats
2019	394,304	1.41	1
2022	512,795	1.39	1
2025	477,796	1.14	1

== Representatives to Congress ==
Period	Representative
18th Congress; 2019–2022	Sonny Lagon
19th Congress; 2022–2025	Sonny Lagon
20th Congress; 2025–2028	Sonny Lagon
Note: A party-list group, can win a maximum of three seats in the House of Representatives.
