= Sonny Lagon =

Filipino politician (born 1969)

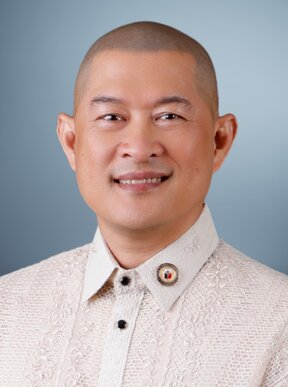
- Official portrait, 2025

Member of the Philippine House of Representatives for Ako Bisaya
- Incumbent
- Assumed office July 30, 2019
- Preceded by: Office established

Personal details
- Born: Sonny Lavado Lagon; February 2, 1969 (age 57) Mambusao, Capiz, Philippines
- Party: Ako Bisaya (partylist; 2018–present); 1CEBU (2018–present)
- Spouse: Daphne Lagon
- Children: 6
- Profession: Engineer

Sonny Lavado Lagon (born February 2, 1969) is a Filipino engineer and an elected member of the representative for the Ako Bisaya party list since 2019. He owns an engineering firm and a massive game fowl farm.

== Early life and business career ==
Lagon was born in Mambusao, Capiz, on February 2, 1969 to Jose Lagon, a wealthy businessman and contractor from Tacurong, Sultan Kudarat and Babie Lavado from Capiz. Lagon owns an engineering firm, where his wife worked as an official since 1995. He also owns a game fowl farm.

== Political career ==
Lagon was a nominee for the 2019 Philippine party-list elections from the Ako Bisaya party list. In the results, the party gained 17th place with 393,101 votes, 1.42% of the total votes. The party gained one seat, gained by Lagon. Lagon originally planned to run for Cebu's 6th congressional district, but eventually he was the first nominee for the 2022 Philippine party-list elections from the Ako Bisaya party list. In the results, the party got 17th place with 508,481 votes, 1.41% of the national votes. This was enough to get one seat, which was taken by Lagon. Lagon is part of the One Cebu party, led by the Governor of Cebu. Lagon supports providing assistance to schools.

== Personal life ==
Lagon is married to Daphne Lagon, another congresswoman for Cebu's 6th congressional district. This caused, for the first time in history, a married couple from Cebu to be sitting in the House of Representatives of the Philippines at the same time. Their sons, Larenz and Lorenz, ran for the 6th and 3rd Sangguniang Panlalawigan district seats.
