= 2nd Congress of the Philippines =

19th legislative term of the Philippines

←	1st	3rd	→
- Old Legislative Building (c. 1988)

Overview
- Term: December 30, 1949 – December 8, 1953
- President: Elpidio Quirino
- Vice President: Fernando Lopez

Senate
- Members: 24
- President: Mariano Jesus Cuenco (until March 5, 1952); Quintin Paredes (March 5 – April 17, 1952); Camilo Osias (April 17–30, 1952); Eulogio Rodriguez (April 30, 1952 – April 17, 1953); Camilo Osias (April 17–30, 1953); Jose Zulueta (April 30 – May 20, 1953); Eulogio Rodriguez (from May 20, 1953)
- President pro tempore: Quintin Paredes (until March 5, 1952); Esteban Abada (March 5 – May 7, 1952); Manuel Briones (May 7, 1952 – April 17, 1953); Jose Zulueta (April 17–30, 1953); Manuel Briones (from April 30, 1953)
- Majority leader: Tomas Cabili
- Minority leader: Carlos P. Garcia

House of Representatives
- Members: 100
- Speaker: Eugenio Perez
- Speaker pro tempore: Domingo Veloso
- Majority leader: Raul Leuterio
- Minority leader: Jose Laurel Jr.

The 2nd Congress of the Philippines (Filipino: Ikalawang Kongreso ng Pilipinas), composed of the Philippine Senate and House of Representatives, met from December 30, 1949, until December 8, 1953, during the second term of President Elpidio Quirino.

== Sessions ==
- First Special Session: December 30, 1949 – January 5, 1950
- First Regular Session: January 23 – May 18, 1950
- Second Special Session: August 1–25, 1950
- Third Special Session: December 4, 1950 – January 6, 1951
- Fourth Special Session: January 8–19, 1951
- Second Regular Session: January 22 – May 17, 1951
- Fifth Special Session: May 21–29, 1951
- Third Regular Session: January 28 – May 22, 1952
- Sixth Special Session: June 23 – July 15, 1952
- Seventh Special Session: November 4–8, 1952
- Fourth Regular Session: January 26, 1953 – May 21, 1953
- Joint Session: December 8, 1953

== Legislation ==
The Second Congress passed a total of 551 laws.

== Leadership ==
=== Senate ===
Senate President

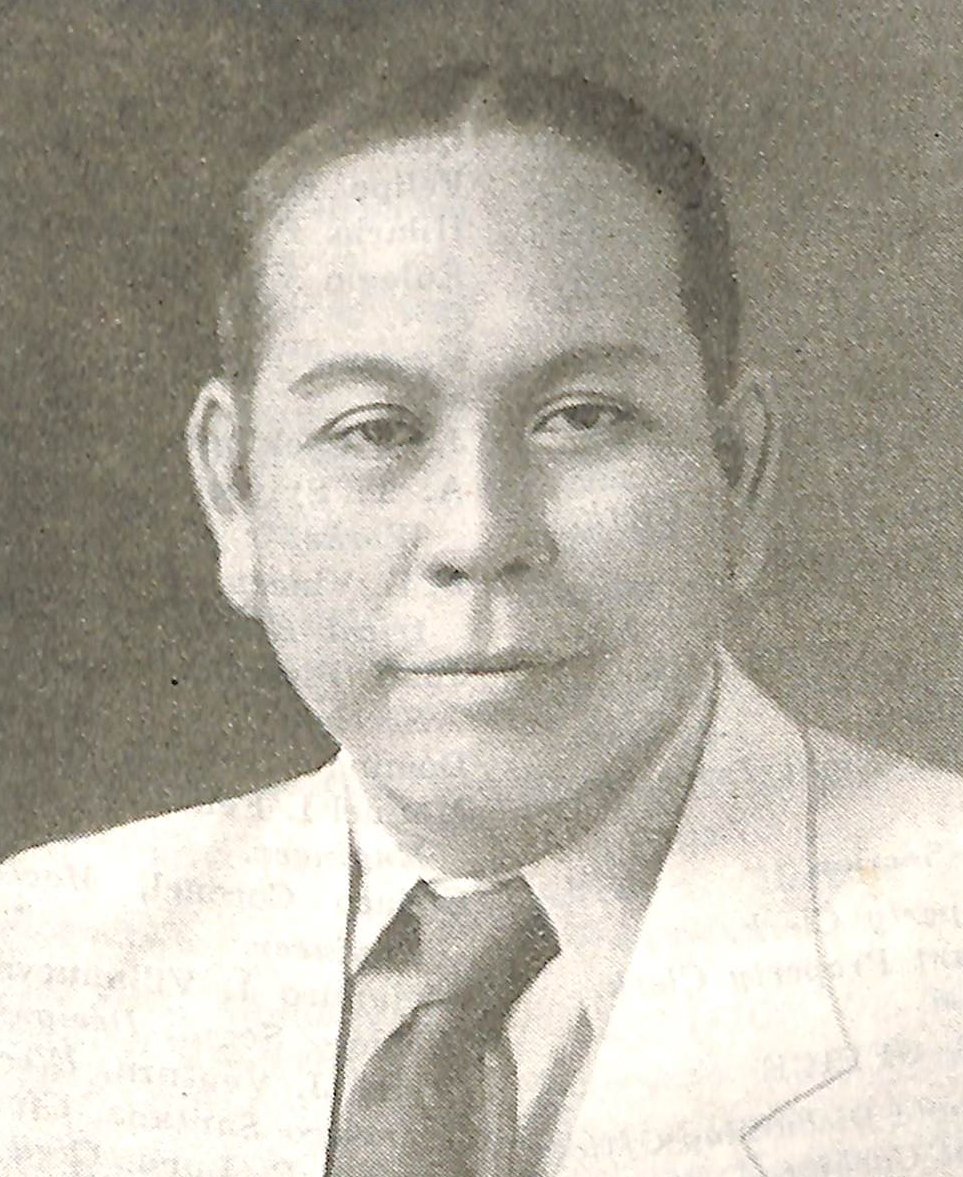
Mariano Jesús Cuenco,
until March 5, 1952

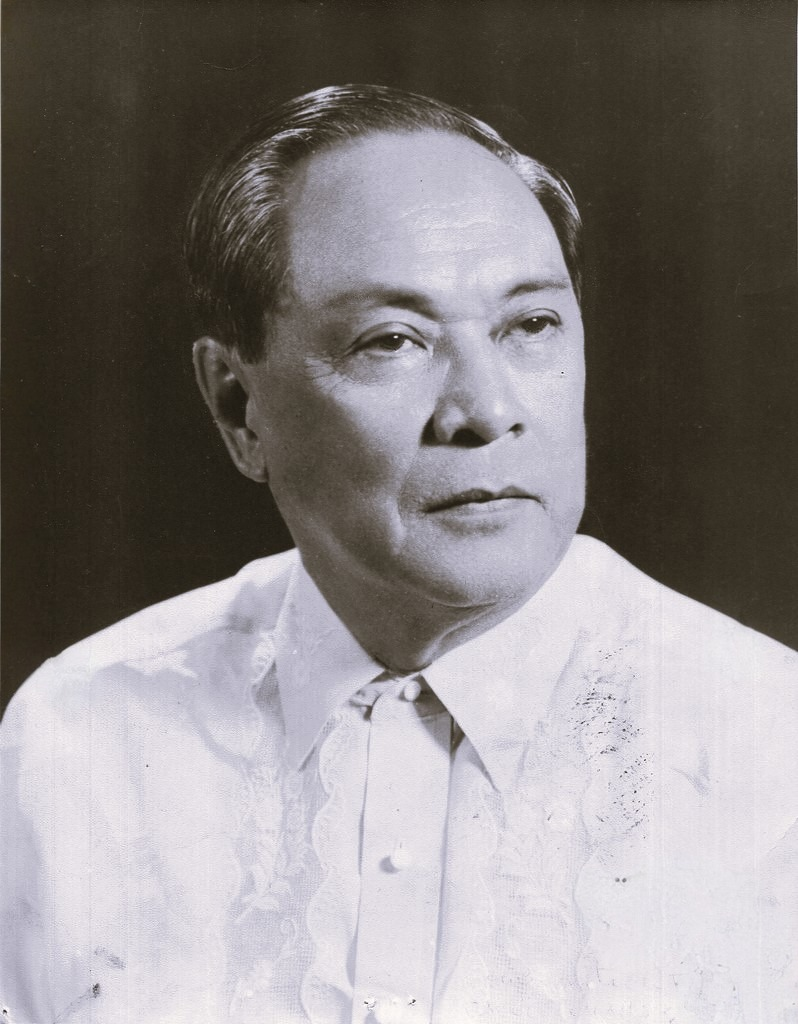
Quintín Paredes,
March 5 – April 17, 1952

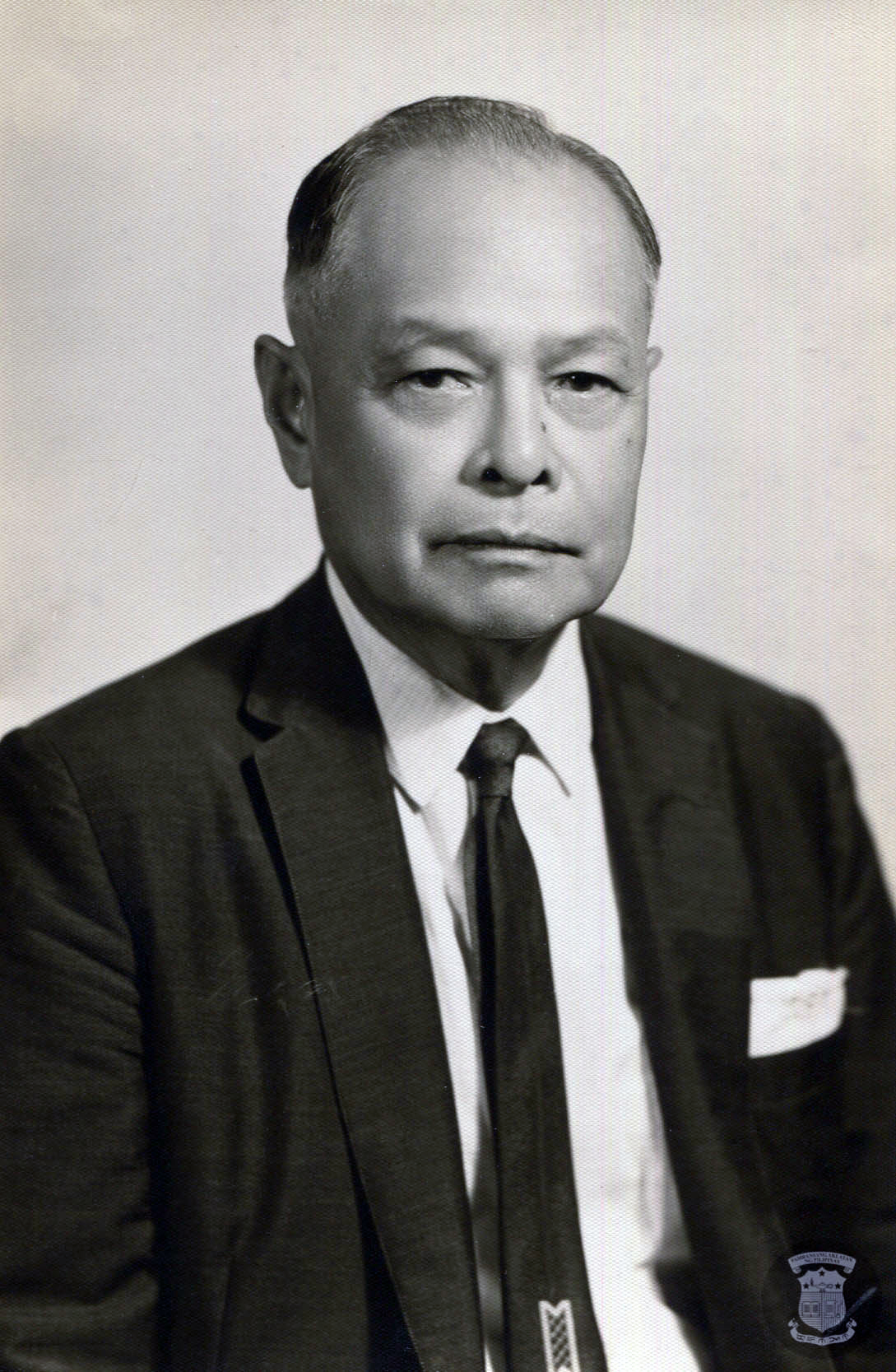
Camilo Osías,
April 17–30, 1952,
April 17–30, 1953

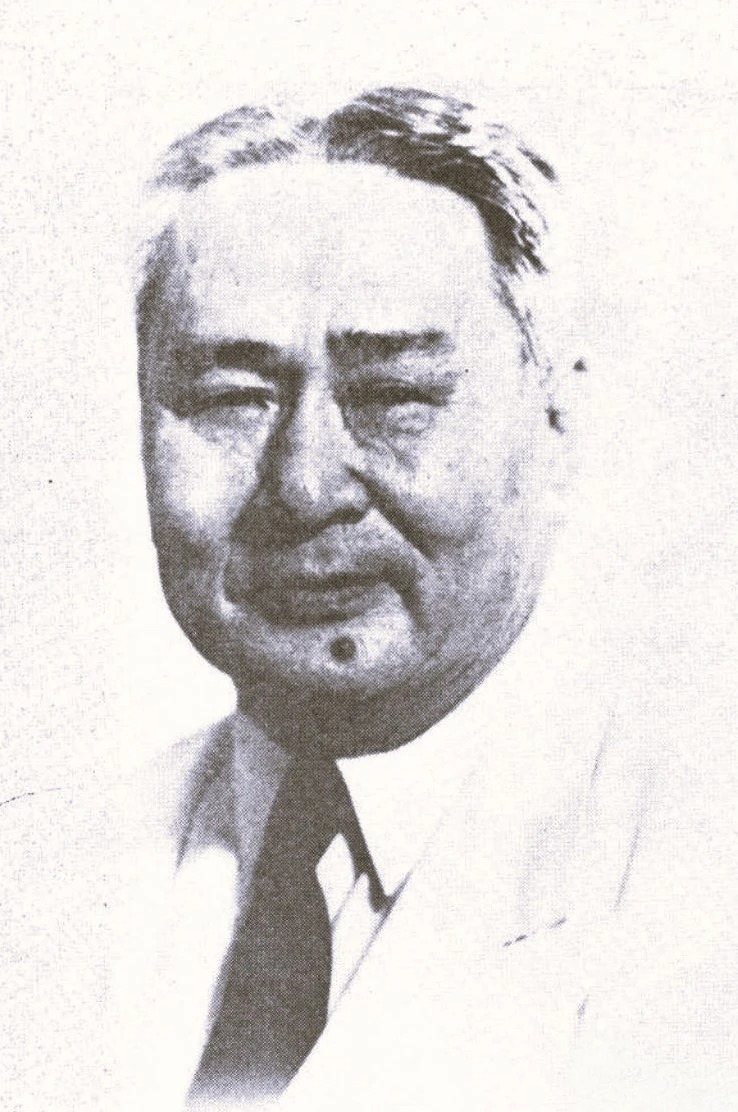
Eulogio Rodriguez,
April 30, 1952 – April 17, 1953,
from May 20, 1953

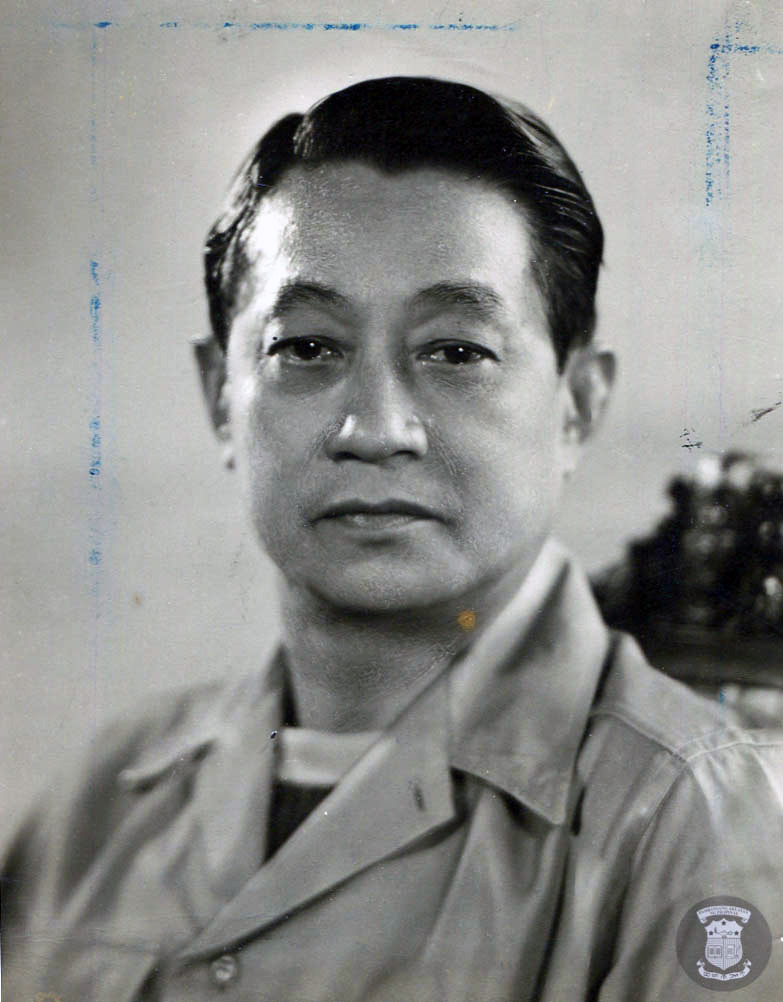
Jose Zulueta,
April 30 – May 20, 1953

- President:
  - Mariano Jesus Cuenco (Liberal), until March 5, 1952
  - Quintin Paredes (Liberal), March 5 – April 17, 1952
  - Camilo Osias (Nacionalista), April 17–30, 1952
  - Eulogio Rodriguez (Nacionalista), April 30, 1952 – April 17, 1953
  - Camilo Osias (Nacionalista), April 17–30, 1953
  - Jose Zulueta (Nacionalista), April 30 – May 20, 1953
  - Eulogio Rodriguez (Nacionalista), from May 20, 1953
- President pro tempore:
  - Quintin Paredes (Liberal), until March 5, 1952
  - Esteban Abada (Liberal), March 5 – May 7, 1952
  - Manuel Briones (Liberal), May 7, 1952 – April 17, 1953
  - Jose Zulueta (Nacionalista), April 17–30, 1953
  - Manuel Briones (Liberal), from April 30, 1953
- Majority Floor Leader: Tomas Cabili (Liberal)
- Minority Floor Leader: Carlos P. Garcia (Nacionalista)

=== House of Representatives ===
House Speaker

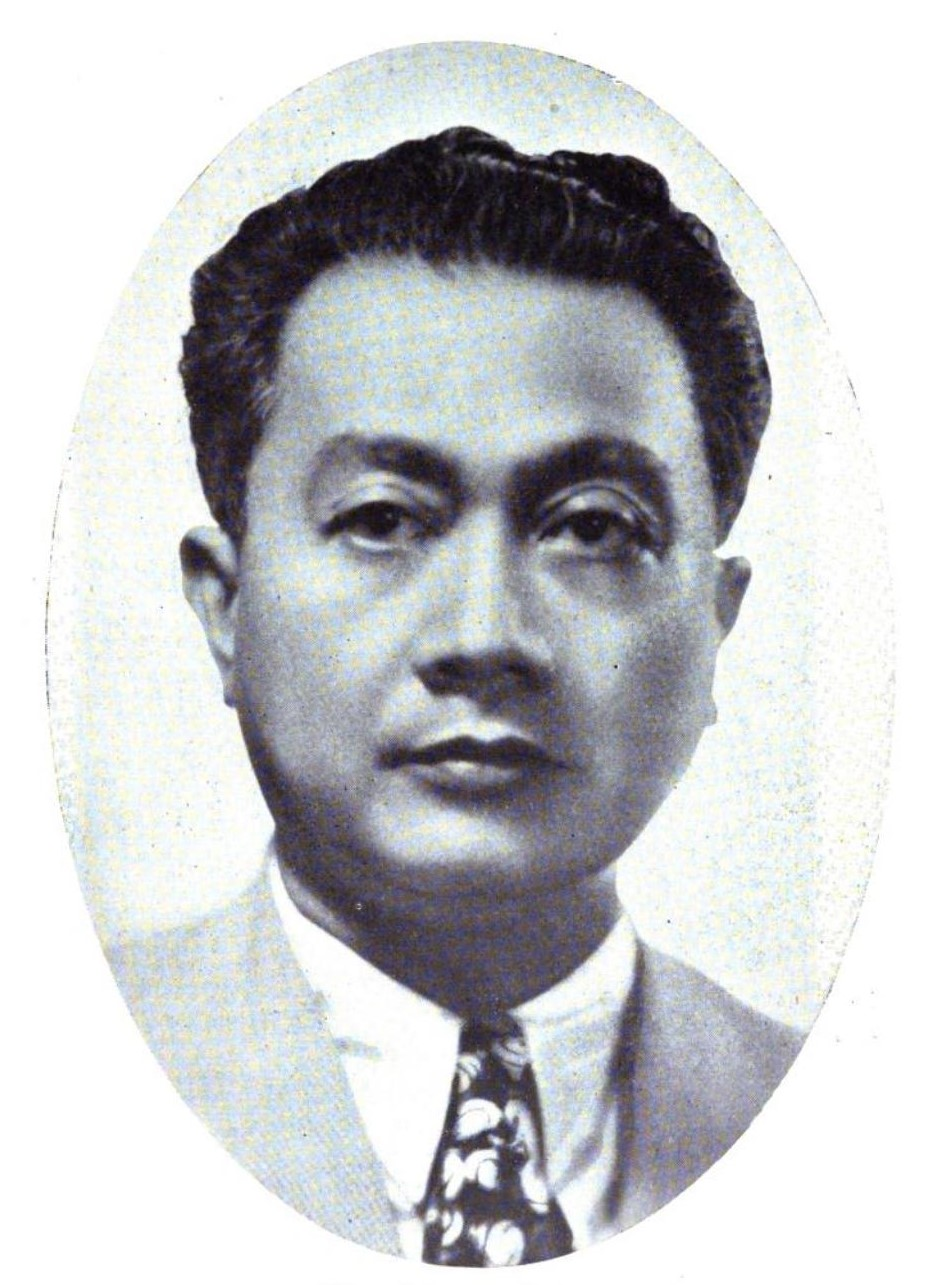
Eugenio Pérez

- Speaker: Eugenio Perez (Pangasinan–2nd, Liberal)
- Speaker pro tempore: Domingo Veloso (Leyte–2nd, Liberal)
- Majority Floor Leader: Raul Leuterio (Oriental Mindoro (Note: Raul Leuterio represented Mindoro's lone district until January 28, 1952.), Liberal)
- Minority Floor Leader: Jose Laurel Jr. (Batangas–3rd, Nacionalista)

== Members ==
=== Senate ===
Composition of the Senate during the 3rd Congress' 1st and 2nd (left), and 3rd & 4th (right) sessions.

The following are the terms of the senators of this Congress, according to the date of election:

- For senators elected on April 23, 1946: May 25, 1946 – December 30, 1951
- For senators elected on November 11, 1947: December 30, 1947 – December 30, 1953
- For senators elected on November 8, 1949: December 30, 1949 – December 30, 1955
- For senators elected on November 13, 1951: December 30, 1951 – December 30, 1957

Senator	Party	Term end
Esteban Abada	Liberal	1955
Pablo Angeles David	Liberal	1953
Melecio Arranz	Liberal	1951
Jose Avelino	Liberal	1951
Manuel Briones	Nacionalista	1957
Tomas Cabili	Nacionalista	1955
Tomas V. Confesor (Note: Tomas V. Confesor died on June 6, 1951.)	Nacionalista	1951
Mariano Jesus Cuenco	Liberal	1951
Teodoro de Vera (Note: Teodoro de Vera was removed by the Senate Electoral Tribunal on April 3, 1952, after an electoral protest.)	Liberal	1955
Francisco Afan Delgado	Nacionalista	1957
Vicente Francisco	Liberal	1951
Carlos P. Garcia (Note: Carlos P. Garcia resigned on December 30, 1953, upon taking office as Vice President of the Philippines.)	Nacionalista	1951, 1957
Jose P. Laurel	Nacionalista	1957
Jose Locsin	Liberal	1957
Vicente Madrigal	Liberal	1953
Enrique Magalona	Liberal	1955
Justiniano Montano	Liberal	1955
Camilo Osias	Nacionalista	1953
Quintin Paredes	Liberal	1955
Geronima Pecson	Liberal	1953
Macario Peralta Jr.	Liberal	1955
Cipriano Primicias Sr.	Nacionalista	1957
Gil Puyat	Liberal	1957
Claro M. Recto (Note: Claro M. Recto replaced Teodoro de Vera on April 3, 1952, after winning an electoral protest.)	Nacionalista	1955
Eulogio Rodriguez	Nacionalista	1953
Vicente Sotto (Note: Vicente Sotto died on May 28, 1950.)	Popular Front	1951
Lorenzo Sumulong	Liberal	1955
Lorenzo Tañada	Liberal	1953
Emiliano Tria Tirona (Note: Emiliano Tria Tirona died on April 8, 1952.)	Liberal	1953
Ramon Torres	Liberal	1951
Felixberto Verano (Note: Felixberto Verano was elected on November 13, 1951, to succeed Fernando Lopez, who took office as Vice President of the Philippines on December 30, 1949. He took office on December 30, 1951.)	Nacionalista	1953
Jose Zulueta	Nacionalista	1957

=== House of Representatives ===
Composition of the House of Representatives during the 2nd Congress.

Seal of the House of Representatives (1950)

House seats by province in the 2nd Congress.

Province/City	District	Representative	Party
Abra	Lone	Virgilio Valera	Liberal
Agusan	Lone	Marcos M. Calo	Liberal
Albay	1st	Lorenzo P. Ziga	Liberal
Albay	2nd	Justino Nuyda	Nacionalista
Albay	3rd	Pio Duran	Nacionalista
Antique	Lone	Tobias Fornier	Nacionalista
Bataan	Lone	Medina Lacson de Leon	Nacionalista
Batanes	Lone	Jorge Abad	Independent
Batangas	1st	Apolinario R. Apacible	Nacionalista
Batangas	2nd	Numeriano U. Babao	Nacionalista
Batangas	3rd	Jose Laurel Jr.	Nacionalista
Bohol	1st	Luis T. Clarin	Liberal
Bohol	2nd	Simeon G. Toribio	Liberal
Bohol	3rd	Esteban Bernido	Nacionalista
Bukidnon	Lone	Cesar M. Fortich	Liberal
Bulacan	1st	Florante C. Roque (Note: Florante C. Roque was removed by the House of Representatives Electoral Tribunal on May 4, 1953 after an electoral protest.)	Liberal
Bulacan	1st	Erasmo Cruz (Note: Erasmo Cruz replaced Florante C. Roque on May 4, 1953, after an electoral protest.)	Nacionalista
Bulacan	2nd	Alejo Santos	Nacionalista
Cagayan	1st	Domingo S. Siazon	Nacionalista
Cagayan	2nd	Paulino A. Alonzo	Liberal
Camarines Norte	Lone	Esmeraldo Eco	Liberal
Camarines Sur	1st	Emilio M. Tible	Nacionalista
Camarines Sur	2nd	Edmundo B. Cea	Nacionalista
Capiz	1st	Ramon A. Arnaldo	Liberal
Capiz	2nd	Cornelio Villareal	Liberal
Capiz	3rd	Godofredo P. Ramos	Nacionalista
Catanduanes	Lone	Severiano P. de Leon	Liberal
Cavite	Lone	Manuel S. Rojas	Liberal
Cebu	1st	Ramon M. Durano	Liberal
Cebu	2nd	Leandro Tojong (Note: Leandro Tojong was removed by the House of Representatives Electoral Tribunal on December 6, 1952, after an electoral protest.)	Liberal
Cebu	2nd	Vicente Logarta (Note: Vicente Logarta replaced Leandro Tojong on December 6, 1952, after winning an electoral protest.)	Nacionalista
Cebu	3rd	Primitivo Sato (Note: Primitivo Sato was removed by the House of Representatives Electoral Tribunal on November 22, 1952, after an electoral protest.)	Liberal
Cebu	3rd	Maximino Noel (Note: Maximino Noel replaced Primitivo Sato on November 22, 1952, after winning an electoral protest.)	Nacionalista
Cebu	4th	Filomeno C. Kintanar	Liberal
Cebu	5th	Miguel Cuenco	Nacionalista
Cebu	6th	Manuel A. Zosa	Nacionalista
Cebu	7th	Nicolas Escario	Liberal
Cotabato	Lone	Blah T. Sinsuat	Nacionalista
Davao	Lone	Ismael L. Veloso	Nacionalista
Ilocos Norte	1st	Antonio Raquiza	Liberal
Ilocos Norte	2nd	Ferdinand Marcos	Liberal
Ilocos Sur	1st	Floro Crisologo	Liberal
Ilocos Sur	2nd	Ricardo Gacula	Liberal
Iloilo	1st	Jose Zulueta (Note: Jose Zulueta took office as Senator of the Philippines on December 30, 1951.)	Liberal
Iloilo	2nd	Pascual Espinosa	Liberal
Iloilo	3rd	Patricio V. Confesor	Nacionalista
Iloilo	4th	Ricardo Ladrido	Nacionalista
Iloilo	5th	Jose Aldeguer	Nacionalista
Isabela	Lone	Samuel Formoso Reyes	Liberal
La Union	1st	Miguel Rilloraza Jr.	Nacionalista
La Union	2nd	Manuel T. Cases	Liberal
Laguna	1st	Manuel Concordia	Liberal
Laguna	2nd	Juan A. Baes (Note: Juan A. Baes was removed by the House of Representatives Electoral Tribunal on December 27, 1951, after an electoral protest.)	Nacionalista
Laguna	2nd	Estanislao Fernandez (Note: Estanislao Fernandez replaced Juan A. Baes on December 27, 1951, after winning an electoral protest.)	Liberal
Lanao	Lone	Mohammad Ali Dimaporo	Liberal
Leyte	1st	Mateo Canonoy	Nacionalista
Leyte	2nd	Domingo Veloso	Liberal
Leyte	3rd	Francisco M. Pajao	Liberal
Leyte	4th	Daniel Romualdez	Nacionalista
Leyte	5th	Atilano R. Cinco	Liberal
Manila	1st	Engracio Clemeña	Nacionalista
Manila	2nd	Arsenio Lacson	Nacionalista
Manila	3rd	Arturo Tolentino	Nacionalista
Manila	4th	Hermenegildo Atienza (Note: Hermenegildo Atienza was removed on February 26, 1952, after an electoral protest.)	Liberal
Manila	4th	Gavino Viola Fernando (Note: Gavino Viola Fernando replaced Hermenegildo Atienza on February 26, 1952, after winning an electoral protest.)	Nacionalista
Marinduque	Lone	Panfilo M. Manguera	Nacionalista
Masbate	Lone	Emilio B. Espinosa	Liberal
Mindoro	Lone (Note: Mindoro was divided into Occidental Mindoro's lone district and Oriental Mindoro's lone district on June 14, 1950.)	Raul Leuterio (Note: Raul Leuterio was redistricted to Oriental Mindoro's lone district on January 28, 1952.)	Liberal
Misamis Occidental	Lone	Porfirio G. Villarin	Liberal
Misamis Oriental	Lone	Emmanuel Pelaez	Liberal
Mountain Province	1st	Antonio Canao	Liberal
Mountain Province	2nd	Dennis Molintas (Note: Dennis Molintas was removed by the House of Representatives Electoral Tribunal on September 25, 1951, after an electoral protest.)	Liberal
Mountain Province	2nd	Ramon P. Mitra (Note: Ramon P. Mitra replaced Dennis Molintas on September 25, 1951, after winning an electoral protest.)	Nacionalista
Mountain Province	3rd	Gabriel Dunuan	Liberal
Negros Occidental	1st	Francisco Ferrer	Liberal
Negros Occidental	2nd	Carlos Hilado	Liberal
Negros Occidental	3rd	Augurio Abeto (Note: Augurio Abeto was removed by the House of Representatives Electoral Tribunal on March 6, 1953, after an electoral protest.)	Liberal
Negros Oriental	1st	Pedro A. Bandoquillo	Liberal
Negros Oriental	2nd	Enrique Medina	Liberal
Nueva Ecija	1st	Jose O. Corpus	Liberal
Nueva Ecija	2nd	Jesus Ilagan	Liberal
Nueva Vizcaya	Lone	Leon Cabarroguis	Liberal
Occidental Mindoro	Lone (Note: Occidental Mindoro's lone district was created from Mindoro's lone district on June 14, 1950.)	Jesus V. Abeleda (Note: Jesus V. Abeleda was elected on November 13, 1951.)	Nacionalista
Oriental Mindoro	Lone (Note: Oriental Mindoro's lone district was created from Mindoro's lone district on June 14, 1950.)	Raul Leuterio (Note: Raul Leuterio was redistricted from Mindoro's lone district on January 28, 1952.)	Liberal
Palawan	Lone	Gaudencio E. Abordo (Note: Gaudencio E. Abordo was removed by the House of Representatives Electoral Tribunal on April 6, 1953, after an electoral protest.)	Nacionalista
Palawan	Lone	Sofronio Española (Note: Sofronio Española replaced Gaudencio E. Abordo on April 6, 1953, after winning an electoral protest.)	Liberal
Pampanga	1st	Diosdado Macapagal	Liberal
Pampanga	2nd	Artemio Macalino	Liberal
Pangasinan	1st	Sulpicio R. Soriano	Liberal
Pangasinan	2nd	Eugenio Perez	Liberal
Pangasinan	3rd	Jose L. de Guzman	Liberal
Pangasinan	4th	Amadeo J. Perez	Liberal
Pangasinan	5th	Cipriano S. Allas	Liberal
Quezon	1st	Narciso H. Umali	Nacionalista
Quezon	2nd	Gaudencio V. Vera	Liberal
Rizal	1st	Eulogio Rodriguez Jr.	Nacionalista
Rizal	2nd	Emilio de la Paz (Note: Emilio de la Paz died on August 30, 1951.)	Nacionalista
Rizal	2nd	Isaias R. Salonga (Note: Isaias R. Salonga was elected on November 13, 1951, to succeed Emilio de la Paz.)	Nacionalista
Romblon	Lone	Florencio Moreno	Nacionalista
Samar	1st	Agripino Escareal	Liberal
Samar	2nd	Tito V. Tizon	Liberal
Samar	3rd	Gregorio B. Abogado	Liberal
Sorsogon	1st	Modesto Galias	Liberal
Sorsogon	2nd	Tomas Clemente	Liberal
Sulu	Lone	Gulamu Rasul (Note: Gulamu Rasul was removed by the House of Representatives Electoral Tribunal on May 5, 1951, after an electoral protest.)	Nacionalista
Sulu	Lone	Ombra Amilbangsa (Note: Ombra Amilbangsa replaced Gulamu Rasul on May 5, 1951, after winning an electoral protest.)	Liberal
Surigao	Lone	Felixberto Verano (Note: Felixberto Verano took office as Senator of the Philippines on December 30, 1951.)	Nacionalista
Tarlac	1st	Jose Roy	Liberal
Tarlac	2nd	Jose Y. Feliciano	Liberal
Zambales	Lone	Ramon Magsaysay (Note: Ramon Magsaysay was appointed Secretary of National Defense on September 1, 1950.)	Liberal
Zambales	Lone	Cesar Miraflor (Note: Cesar Miraflor was elected on November 13, 1951, to succeed Ramon Magsaysay.)	Liberal
Zamboanga	Lone	Roseller T. Lim	Nacionalista

== See also ==
- Congress of the Philippines
- Senate of the Philippines
- House of Representatives of the Philippines
- 1949 Philippine general election
- 1951 Philippine general election
