= Negros Occidental's 3rd congressional district =

Legislative district of the Philippines

- Constituency for the House of Representatives of the Philippines
- Boundary of Negros Occidental's 3rd congressional district in Negros Occidental
- Location of Negros Occidental within the Philippines
- Province: Negros Occidental
- Region: Negros Island Region
- Population: 482,646 (2020)
- Electorate: 313,671 (2022)
- Major settlements: 5 LGUs: Cities; Silay; Talisay; Victorias; Municipalities; Enrique B. Magalona; Murcia
- Area: 942.29 km^{2} (363.82 sq mi)

Current constituency
- Created: 1907
- Representative: Javi Benitez
- Political party: PFP
- Congressional bloc: Majority

Negros Occidental's 3rd congressional district is one of the six congressional districts of the Philippines in the province of Negros Occidental. It has been represented in the House of Representatives of the Philippines since 1916 and earlier in the Philippine Assembly from 1907 to 1916. The district consists of the cities of Silay, Talisay and Victorias, as well as the adjacent municipalities of Enrique B. Magalona and Murcia. The seat is currently represented in the 20th Congress by Javier Miguel L. Benitez of the Partido Federal ng Pilipinas (PFP).

The district served as an electoral district in the 1934 Constitutional Convention, electing two delegates, and in the 1971 Constitutional Convention, electing four delegates.

It is one of two congressional districts that produced at least two House Speakers (the other district is Leyte's 1st): Gil Montilla and José Yulo.

== List of members representing the district ==
=== Philippine Assembly (1907–1916) ===
Portrait	Member (Lifespan)	Term of office	Party	Legislature	Electoral history	Constituencies
District created January 9, 1907.
	Agustin Montilla	October 16, 1907 – October 16, 1909	Progresista	1st Legislature	Elected in 1907.	1907–1916; Binalbagan, Cauayan, Himamaylan, Hinigaran, Ilog, Isabela, Kabankalan, Pontevedra
	Rafael Ramos	October 16, 1909 – October 16, 1912	Nacionalista	2nd Legislature	Elected in 1909.	1907–1916; Binalbagan, Cauayan, Himamaylan, Hinigaran, Ilog, Isabela, Kabankalan, Pontevedra
	Gil Montilla (1876–1946)	October 16, 1912 – October 16, 1916	Nacionalista	3rd Legislature	Elected in 1912.	1907–1916; Binalbagan, Cauayan, Himamaylan, Hinigaran, Ilog, Isabela, Kabankalan, Pontevedra

=== House of Representatives (1916–1935) ===
Portrait	Member (Lifespan)	Term of office	Party	Legislature	Electoral history	Constituencies
	Gil Montilla (1876–1946)	October 16, 1916 – June 3, 1919	Nacionalista	4th Legislature	Re-elected in 1916.	1916–1919; Binalbagan, Cauayan, Himamaylan, Hinigaran, Ilog, Isabela, Kabankalan, Pontevedra
	Tito Silverio (1873–1964)	June 3, 1919 – June 6, 1922	Nacionalista	5th Legislature	Elected in 1919.	1919–1935; Binalbagan, Cauayan, Himamaylan, Hinigaran, Ilog, Isabela, Kabankalan, La Castellana, Pontevedra
	Eliseo Limsiaco (1895–1950)	June 6, 1922 – June 2, 1925	Nacionalista Colectivista	6th Legislature	Elected in 1922.	1919–1935; Binalbagan, Cauayan, Himamaylan, Hinigaran, Ilog, Isabela, Kabankalan, La Castellana, Pontevedra
	Isaac Lacson (1889–1964)	June 2, 1925 – June 5, 1928	Nacionalista Consolidado	7th Legislature	Elected in 1925.	1919–1935; Binalbagan, Cauayan, Himamaylan, Hinigaran, Ilog, Isabela, Kabankalan, La Castellana, Pontevedra
	Emilio Montilla	June 5, 1928 – June 2, 1931	Nacionalista Consolidado	8th Legislature	Elected in 1928.	1919–1935; Binalbagan, Cauayan, Himamaylan, Hinigaran, Ilog, Isabela, Kabankalan, La Castellana, Pontevedra
	Emilio Yulo	June 2, 1931 – June 5, 1934	Nacionalista Consolidado	9th Legislature	Elected in 1931.	1919–1935; Binalbagan, Cauayan, Himamaylan, Hinigaran, Ilog, Isabela, Kabankalan, La Castellana, Pontevedra
	Agustin S. Ramos (1885–1957)	June 5, 1934 – November 15, 1935	Nacionalista Democratico	10th Legislature	Elected in 1934.	1919–1935; Binalbagan, Cauayan, Himamaylan, Hinigaran, Ilog, Isabela, Kabankalan, La Castellana, Pontevedra

=== 1934 Constitutional Convention (1934–1935) ===
Seat A					Seat B					Legislature	Constituencies
Portrait	Member (Lifespan)	Term of office	Party	Electoral history	Portrait	Member (Lifespan)	Term of office	Party	Electoral history	Legislature	Constituencies
	Enrique Montilla	July 30, 1934 – February 19, 1935	Nonpartisan	Elected in 1934.		Jesus Y. Perez	July 30, 1934 – February 19, 1935	Nonpartisan	Elected in 1934.	1934 Constitutional Convention	1934–1935; Binalbagan, Cauayan, Himamaylan, Hinigaran, Ilog, Isabela, Kabankalan, La Castellana, Pontevedra

=== National Assembly (1935–1945) ===
==== Commonwealth ====
Portrait	Member (Lifespan)	Term of office	Party	Legislature	Electoral history	Constituencies
	Gil Montilla (1876–1946)	November 15, 1935 – December 30, 1938	Nacionalista Democratico	1st National Assembly	Re-elected in 1935.	1935–1941; Binalbagan, Cauayan, Himamaylan, Hinigaran, Ilog, Isabela, Kabankalan, La Castellana, Pontevedra
	José Yulo (1894–1976)	December 30, 1938 – December 30, 1941	Nacionalista	2nd National Assembly	Elected in 1938.	1935–1941; Binalbagan, Cauayan, Himamaylan, Hinigaran, Ilog, Isabela, Kabankalan, La Castellana, Pontevedra
District dissolved into the two-seat Negros Occidental's at-large district for the Second Republic National Assembly.

=== House of Representatives (1945–1973) ===
Portrait	Member (Lifespan)	Term of office	Party	Legislature	Electoral history	Constituencies
District re-created May 24, 1945.
	Raymundo Vargas	June 9, 1945 – May 25, 1946	Nacionalista	1st Commonwealth Congress	Elected in 1941.	1945–1949; Binalbagan, Cauayan, Himamaylan, Hinigaran, Ilog, Isabela, Kabankalan, La Castellana, Pontevedra
	Eliseo Limsiaco (1895–1950)	May 25, 1946 – December 30, 1949	Liberal	2nd Commonwealth Congress	Elected in 1946.	1945–1949; Binalbagan, Cauayan, Himamaylan, Hinigaran, Ilog, Isabela, Kabankalan, La Castellana, Pontevedra
	Eliseo Limsiaco (1895–1950)	May 25, 1946 – December 30, 1949	Liberal	1st Congress	Elected in 1946.	1945–1949; Binalbagan, Cauayan, Himamaylan, Hinigaran, Ilog, Isabela, Kabankalan, La Castellana, Pontevedra
	Augurio Abeto (1904–1977)	December 30, 1949 – December 30, 1953	Liberal	2nd Congress	Elected in 1949.	1949–1953; Asia, Binalbagan, Cauayan, Himamaylan, Hinigaran, Ilog, Isabela, Kabankalan, La Castellana, Pontevedra, Sipalay
	Agustin Gatuslao (1904–1973)	December 30, 1953 – December 30, 1965	Nacionalista	3rd Congress	Elected in 1953.	1953–1957; Asia, Binalbagan, Cauayan, Himamaylan, Hinigaran, Ilog, Isabela, Kabankalan, La Castellana, Magallon, Pontevedra, Sipalay
	Agustin Gatuslao (1904–1973)	December 30, 1953 – December 30, 1965	Nacionalista	4th Congress	Re-elected in 1957.	1957–1961; Asia, Binalbagan, Cauayan, Himamaylan, Hinigaran, Ilog, Isabela, Kabankalan, La Castellana, Moises Padilla, Pontevedra, Sipalay
	Agustin Gatuslao (1904–1973)	December 30, 1953 – December 30, 1965	Nacionalista	5th Congress	Re-elected in 1961.	1961–1973; Binalbagan, Candoni, Cauayan, Himamaylan, Hinigaran, Hinoba-an, Ilog, Isabela, Kabankalan, La Castellana, Moises Padilla, Pontevedra, Sipalay
	Felix Feria Jr.	December 30, 1965 – December 30, 1969	Liberal	6th Congress	Elected in 1965.	1961–1973; Binalbagan, Candoni, Cauayan, Himamaylan, Hinigaran, Hinoba-an, Ilog, Isabela, Kabankalan, La Castellana, Moises Padilla, Pontevedra, Sipalay
	Agustin Gatuslao (1904–1973)	December 30, 1969 – January 17, 1973	Nacionalista	7th Congress	Elected in 1969. Term cut short upon the ratification of a new Constitution.	1961–1973; Binalbagan, Candoni, Cauayan, Himamaylan, Hinigaran, Hinoba-an, Ilog, Isabela, Kabankalan, La Castellana, Moises Padilla, Pontevedra, Sipalay
District dissolved into the sixteen-seat Region VI's at-large district for the Interim Batasang Pambansa, followed by the seven-seat Negros Occidental's at-large district for the Regular Batasang Pambansa.

=== 1971 Constitutional Convention (1971–1972) ===
Seat A					Seat B					Seat C					Seat D					Legislature	Constituencies
Portrait	Member (Lifespan)	Term of office	Party	Electoral history	Portrait	Member (Lifespan)	Term of office	Party	Electoral history	Portrait	Member (Lifespan)	Term of office	Party	Electoral history	Portrait	Member (Lifespan)	Term of office	Party	Electoral history	Legislature	Constituencies
	Jacinto Montilla	June 1, 1971 – November 29, 1972	Nonpartisan	Elected in 1970.		Gregorio Tingson	June 1, 1971 – November 29, 1972	Nonpartisan	Elected in 1970.		Plaridel Villadelgado	June 1, 1971 – November 29, 1972	Nonpartisan	Elected in 1970.		Juan Yulo	June 1, 1971 – November 29, 1972	Nonpartisan	Elected in 1970.	1971 Constitutional Convention	1971–1972; Binalbagan, Candoni, Cauayan, Himamaylan, Hinigaran, Hinoba-an, Ilog, Isabela, Kabankalan, La Castellana, Moises Padilla, Pontevedra, Sipalay

=== House of Representatives (1987–present) ===
Portrait	Member (Lifespan)	Term of office	Party	Legislature	Electoral history	Constituencies
District re-created February 2, 1987.
	Jose Carlos Lacson	June 30, 1987 – June 30, 1998	UNIDO	8th Congress	Elected in 1987.	1987–present Enrique B. Magalona, Murcia, Silay, Talisay, Victorias
	Jose Carlos Lacson	June 30, 1987 – June 30, 1998	Lakas	9th Congress	Re-elected in 1992.	1987–present Enrique B. Magalona, Murcia, Silay, Talisay, Victorias
	Jose Carlos Lacson	June 30, 1987 – June 30, 1998	Lakas	10th Congress	Re-elected in 1995.	1987–present Enrique B. Magalona, Murcia, Silay, Talisay, Victorias
	Edith Villanueva	June 30, 1998 – June 30, 2001	LDP	11th Congress	Elected in 1998.	1987–present Enrique B. Magalona, Murcia, Silay, Talisay, Victorias
	Jose Carlos Lacson	June 30, 2001 – June 30, 2010	Lakas	12th Congress	Elected in 2001.	1987–present Enrique B. Magalona, Murcia, Silay, Talisay, Victorias
	Jose Carlos Lacson	June 30, 2001 – June 30, 2010	Lakas	13th Congress	Re-elected in 2004.	1987–present Enrique B. Magalona, Murcia, Silay, Talisay, Victorias
	Jose Carlos Lacson	June 30, 2001 – June 30, 2010	Lakas	14th Congress	Re-elected in 2007.	1987–present Enrique B. Magalona, Murcia, Silay, Talisay, Victorias
	Albee Benitez (born 1966)	June 30, 2010 – June 30, 2019	Liberal	15th Congress	Elected in 2010.	1987–present Enrique B. Magalona, Murcia, Silay, Talisay, Victorias
	Albee Benitez (born 1966)	June 30, 2010 – June 30, 2019	Independent	16th Congress	Re-elected in 2013.	1987–present Enrique B. Magalona, Murcia, Silay, Talisay, Victorias
	Albee Benitez (born 1966)	June 30, 2010 – June 30, 2019	PDP–Laban	17th Congress	Re-elected in 2016.	1987–present Enrique B. Magalona, Murcia, Silay, Talisay, Victorias
	Jose Francisco Benitez (born 1969)	June 30, 2019 – August 16, 2024	PDP–Laban (until 2022)	18th Congress	Elected in 2019.	1987–present Enrique B. Magalona, Murcia, Silay, Talisay, Victorias
	Jose Francisco Benitez (born 1969)	June 30, 2019 – August 16, 2024	PFP (from 2022)	18th Congress	Elected in 2019.	1987–present Enrique B. Magalona, Murcia, Silay, Talisay, Victorias
	Jose Francisco Benitez (born 1969)	June 30, 2019 – August 16, 2024	PFP (from 2022)	19th Congress	Re-elected in 2022. Resigned on appointment as Technical Education and Skills Development Authority director general.	1987–present Enrique B. Magalona, Murcia, Silay, Talisay, Victorias
Vacant (August 16, 2024 – June 30, 2025)				19th Congress	No special election held to fill vacancy.	1987–present Enrique B. Magalona, Murcia, Silay, Talisay, Victorias
	Javi Benitez (born 1994)	June 30, 2025 – present	PFP	20th Congress	Elected in 2025.	1987–present Enrique B. Magalona, Murcia, Silay, Talisay, Victorias

== Election results ==
=== 2010 ===
2010 Philippine House of Representatives election in Negros Occidental
Party	Candidate	Votes	%
NPC	Albee Benitez	116,772	62.21
Independent	Esteban Coscolluela	40,602	21.63
Independent	Ted Jimenez	30,325	16.16
Valid ballots		187,699	92.05
Invalid or blank votes		16,219	7.95
Total votes		203,918	100.00
NPC gain from Lakas–Kampi			

=== 2013 ===
2013 Philippine House of Representatives election in Negros Occidental
Party	Candidate	Votes	%
Liberal	Albee Benitez (incumbent)	107,422	64.83
Lakas	Jose Carlos Lacson	58,268	35.17
Valid ballots		165,690	91.06
Invalid or blank votes		16,263	8.94
Total votes		181,953	100.00
Liberal hold			

=== 2016 ===
2016 Philippine House of Representatives election in Negros Occidental
Party	Candidate	Votes	%
Independent	Albee Benitez (incumbent)	177,232	90.37
NUP	Anthony Puey	13,393	6.83
Independent	Antonio Barello Jr.	5,488	2.80
Valid ballots		196,113	82.63
Invalid or blank votes		41,240	17.37
Total votes		237,353	100.00
Independent hold			

=== 2019 ===
2019 Philippine House of Representatives election in Negros Occidental
Party	Candidate	Votes	%
PDP–Laban	Jose Francisco Benitez	173,352	100.00
Total votes		173,352	100.00
PDP–Laban hold			

=== 2022 ===
2022 Philippine House of Representatives election in Negros Occidental
Party	Candidate	Votes	%
PDP–Laban	Jose Francisco Benitez (incumbent)	204,301	92.33
Reform	Toto Bernard Ferraris	16,967	7.67
Total votes		221,268	100.00
PDP–Laban hold			

=== 2025 ===
2025 Philippine House of Representatives election in Negros Occidental
Party	Candidate	Votes	%
PFP	Javi Benitez	200,044	92.03
PLM	Toto Bernard Ferraris	17,336	7.97
Total votes		217,380	100.00
PFP hold			

== See also ==
- Legislative districts of Negros Occidental

House of Representatives of the Philippines
Preceded by Abra's at-large congressional district (as the home district of the speaker of the House of Representatives)	Home district of the speaker of the National Assembly; November 25, 1935 – December 30, 1938; January 24, 1939 – December 30, 1941	Succeeded by Tarlac's at-large congressional district
