= Salvador Laguda =

Filipino lawyer and politician

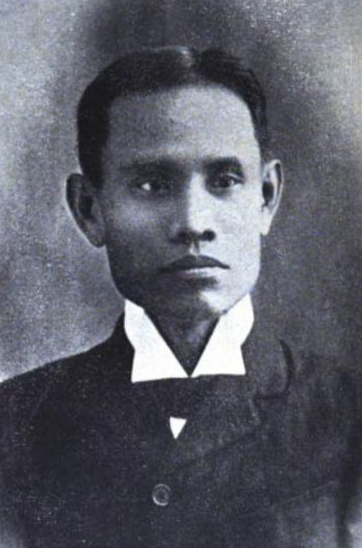
- Laguda as member of the Philippine Assembly, c. 1908

Philippine Secretary of Commerce and Communications
- In office February 1923 – July 1923
- Appointed by: Leonard Wood
- Preceded by: Dionisio Jakosalem; Miguel Unson (acting)

Member of the Philippine Assembly representing Iloilo's 3rd district
- In office 1907–1909
- Preceded by: position established
- Succeeded by: José López Vito

Vice president of the Philippine National Bank
- In office 1924–1926

Personal details
- Born: November 6, 1872 Mambusao, Capiz
- Died: May 27, 1931 (aged 58) Iloilo City, Iloilo
- Political party: Progresista
- Education: Escuela de Ingenieros Industriales de Barcelona; Universidad de Madrid

Salvador Laguda y Andaya (November 6, 1872 – May 27, 1931) was a Filipino lawyer and politician. He represented Iloilo's 3rd district in the Philippine Assembly.

He also served as the Secretary of Commerce and Communications under Governor General Leonard Wood until his resignation in 1923.

== Early life and career ==
He was born in Mambusao, Capiz. His father, Don Marcelino Laguda, was gobernadorcillo of the town. He studied at the Colegio-Seminario de Jaro, where he received minor orders in his ecclesiastical career. He also studied at the Escuela de Ingenieros Industriales de Barcelona in 1894 and spent two years in Spain at the Universidad de Madrid for law. In 1903, he passed the bar examination. Back in the Philippines, he practiced law but held no office and was an active member of the Progresista Party. He had worked in journalism, being an editor of the newspaper "El Tiempo" in Iloilo. He was also editor-in-chief of La Vanguardia and Las Noticias.

== Business and political career ==
Laguda was one of the active sugar hacenderos in politics, becoming a Filipino assemblyan, vice-president of the Philippine National Bank, first Agricultural Congress, and the National Development Company. He also became president of the Lopez Sugar Central in Negros. He was married to Carmen Lopez, a member of the Lopez family.

=== Sugar centrals financed by the Philippine National Bank ===
Under Governor General Leonard Wood, Laguda was appointed as the Secretary of Commerce and Communications in February 1923.

Disagreements with developmental frameworks and economic reforms following the 1921 Philippine financial crisis further fueled tensions between the governor-general and Filipino government officials. In 1923, for instance, Wood's motives were questioned when he faced two potential buyers for sugar centrals in the receivership of the PNB. The first buyer was a group of sugar planters from Negros Occidental, led by Rafael Alunan. They offered to buy the centrals for cash but wanted the price of P34.1 million to be reduced due to depreciation and financial constraints. This offer was supported by the Philippine Chamber of Commerce, especially with Laguda as the commerce secretary. Laguda supported Alunan's proposal, however, suggesting a price of P21 million, with cash payment required within six to eight months. He also recommended that the PNB should provide P6 million for commercial loans to keep operations running, to be paid back with 8% interest within five years. The proposed plan included terms for potential bonds and required the new owners to pay dividends to the PNB until the original amount was settled.

Wood was not in favor of selling the centrals to Negros hacenderos, believing they lacked strong technical and management skills. Instead, he preferred the second group which consisted of American firms, Hayden, Stone and Company and E. Atkins and Company of Cuba, for their better capabilities.

In July 1923, Laguda resigned as commerce secretary during the "cabinet crisis".
