= Daphne Lagon =

Filipino politician (born 1978)

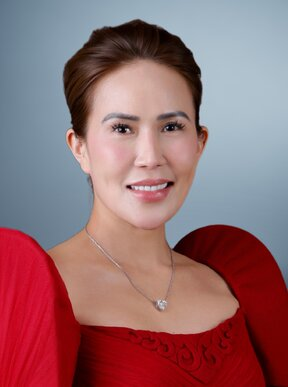
- Official portrait, 2025

Member of the House of Representatives of the Philippines from Cebu's 6th congressional district
- Incumbent
- Assumed office June 30, 2022
- Preceded by: Emmarie Dizon

Personal details
- Born: Daphne Arias; November 29, 1978 (age 47) Catmon, Cebu, Philippines
- Party: NUP (2026–present); 1CEBU (2021–present)
- Other political affiliations: Lakas (2021–2026)
- Spouse: Sonny Lagon
- Children: 5
- Education: University of San Jose-Recoletos (undergraduate)

Daphne Arias Lagon (born November 29, 1978) is a Filipino politician who has been a member of the House of Representatives representing Cebu's 6th congressional district since 2022.

== Personal life ==
She was born to police officer Rogelio Arias and Perla Arias, both of whom are from Tuburan. She has 5 siblings.

She married businessman and incumbent Ako Bisaya Party List Representative Sonny Lagon.

she and Sonny Lagon have 5 children 4 sons and 1 daughter their sons Lorenz and Larenz are twins and currently both serve as Cebu Provincial Board members Lorenz serving from the Cebu's 3rd congressional district and Larenz serving from her own district their other son Patric is currently a municipal councilor of Cordova

== Political career ==
Lagon is a long-time member of the One Cebu party.

She first entered politics in 2013 when she ran for vice mayor of Tuburan, Cebu as the running mate of former mayor Rose Marie Suezo. However, she was unsuccessful, losing to Danilo Diamante.

In 2016_{,} she ran for mayor but lost to incumbent Democrito Diamante by a mere 46 votes. She made another mayoral bid in 2019 but lost to vice mayor Danilo Diamante by 3,253 votes.

=== Representative, 6th District of Cebu ===
In 2021, she filed her candidacy under the Lakas–CMD banner for representative of the 6th congressional district of Cebu, aiming to succeed Emmarie Ouano-Dizon who chose to run for representative of the newly-created lone district of Mandaue City in the 2022 elections. Lagon's bid was successful; she earned almost 75% of the vote and defeated four candidates.

Lagon won reelection in 2025 unopposed, still under Lakas-CMD.

During her term in office, Lagon filed several bills for the benefit of the 6th district, and has done several other projects and programs, including eye care programs, aid hand-outs, and infrastructure projects.

In February 2025, Lagon was among the 240 House representatives – and one of 9 from Cebu – to vote for the articles of impeachment against Vice President Sara Duterte, the process of which later encountered legal scrutiny.

==== House committee memberships ====
- Member for the majority, Appropriatios
- Member for the majority, Creative Industries
- Member for the majority, Ethics and Privileges
- Member for the majority, Foreign Affairs
- Vice chairperson, Nuclear Energy
- Vice chairperson, Population and Family Relations
- Member for the majority, Public Works and Highways
- Assistant Majority Leader, Rules
- Member for the majority, Tourism
- Member for the majority, Visayas Development
- Member for majority, Welfare of Children
- Member for the majority, Women and Gender Equality

== Electoral history ==
Electoral history of Daphne Lagon
Year	Office	Party		Votes received				Result
Year	Office	Local	National	Total	%	P.	Swing	Result
2022	Representative (Cebu–6th)	1CEBU	Lakas	82,443	74.80%	1st	—N/a	Won
2025	Representative (Cebu–6th)	1CEBU	Lakas	104,768	100.00%	1st	+25.20	Unopposed

== See also ==
- List of female members of the House of Representatives of the Philippines
- 19th Congress of the Philippines
- 20th Congress of the Philippines
