= Mindoro's at-large congressional district =

Legislative district of the Philippines

Mindoro's at-large congressional district was the lone congressional district of the Philippines in the historical province of Mindoro for various national legislatures before 1952. The former province elected its representatives province-wide at-large from its reorganization under Article 6 of the Decreto de 18 junio de 1898 y las instrucciones sobre el régimen de las provincias y pueblos for the Malolos Congress in 1898 until its dissolution in 1952 into the present provinces of Occidental Mindoro and Oriental Mindoro. It was a single-member district throughout the ten legislatures of the Insular Government of the Philippine Islands from 1907 to 1935, the three legislatures of the Philippine Commonwealth from 1935 to 1946, and the first two congresses of the Third Philippine Republic from 1946 to 1952.

On two occasions in its history, Mindoro sent more than one member to the national legislatures who were also elected or appointed at-large. Three representatives were sent to the National Assembly (Malolos Congress) of the First Philippine Republic from 1898 to 1901 and two representatives to the National Assembly of the Second Philippine Republic from 1943 to 1944.

After 1952, all representatives were elected from Occidental Mindoro's and Oriental Mindoro's congressional districts.

== Representation history ==
#	Term of office		National Assembly	Seat A				Seat B				Seat C			
#	Start	End	National Assembly	Image	Member	Party	Electoral history	Image	Member	Party	Electoral history	Image	Member	Party	Electoral history
=== Mindoro's at-large district for the Malolos Congress ===
District created June 18, 1898.
–	September 15, 1898	March 23, 1901	1st		Antonino Constantino	Independent	Elected in 1898.		Arturo Dancel	Independent	Appointed.		Perfecto Gabriel	Independent	Appointed.
#	Term of office		Legislature	Single seat				Seats eliminated							
#	Start	End	Legislature	Image	Member	Party	Electoral history	Seats eliminated							
=== Mindoro's at-large district for the Philippine Assembly ===								Seats eliminated							
District re-created January 9, 1907.								Seats eliminated							
1	October 16, 1907	March 1, 1914	1st		Macario Adriático	Nacionalista	Elected in 1907.	Seats eliminated							
1	October 16, 1907	March 1, 1914	2nd		Macario Adriático	Nacionalista	Re-elected in 1909.	Seats eliminated							
1	October 16, 1907	March 1, 1914	3rd		Macario Adriático	Nacionalista	Re-elected in 1912. Resigned on appointment as Code Committee member.	Seats eliminated							
2	June 8, 1914	October 16, 1916	3rd		Mariano P. Leuterio	Liga Popular	Elected in 1914 to finish Adriático's term.	Seats eliminated							
#	Term of office		Legislature	Single seat				Seats eliminated							
#	Start	End	Legislature	Image	Member	Party	Electoral history	Seats eliminated							
=== Mindoro's at-large district for the House of Representatives of the Philippine Islands ===								Seats eliminated							
(2)	October 16, 1916	June 6, 1922	4th		Mariano P. Leuterio	Nacionalista	Re-elected in 1916.	Seats eliminated							
(2)	October 16, 1916	June 6, 1922	5th		Mariano P. Leuterio	Nacionalista	Re-elected in 1919.	Seats eliminated							
3	June 6, 1922	June 2, 1925	6th		Juan L. Luna	Nacionalista; Colectivista	Elected in 1922.	Seats eliminated							
(2)	June 2, 1925	June 5, 1928	7th		Mariano P. Leuterio	Nacionalista; Consolidado	Elected in 1925.	Seats eliminated							
(3)	June 5, 1928	June 2, 1931	8th		Juan L. Luna	Nacionalista; Consolidado	Elected in 1928.	Seats eliminated							
(2)	June 2, 1931	April 23, 1932	9th		Mariano P. Leuterio	Nacionalista; Consolidado	Elected in 1931. Died.	Seats eliminated							
(3)	June 4, 1932	June 5, 1934	9th		Juan L. Luna	Nacionalista; Consolidado	Elected in 1932 to finish Leuterio's term.	Seats eliminated							
4	June 5, 1934	September 16, 1935	10th		Raul Leuterio	Nacionalista; Democrático	Elected in 1934.	Seats eliminated							
#	Term of office		National Assembly	Single seat				Seats eliminated							
#	Start	End	National Assembly	Image	Member	Party	Electoral history	Seats eliminated							
=== Mindoro's at-large district for the National Assembly (Commonwealth of the Philippines) ===								Seats eliminated							
(3)	November 15, 1935	December 30, 1938	1st		Juan L. Luna	Nacionalista; Democrático	Elected in 1935.	Seats eliminated							
(4)	December 30, 1938	December 30, 1941	2nd		Raul Leuterio	Nacionalista	Elected in 1938.	Seats eliminated							
#	Term of office		National Assembly	Seat A				Seat B				Seats restored			
#	Start	End	National Assembly	Image	Member	Party	Electoral history	Image	Member	Party	Electoral history	Seats restored			
=== Mindoro's at-large district for the National Assembly (Second Philippine Republic) ===												Seats restored			
District re-created September 7, 1943.												Seats restored			
–	September 25, 1943	February 2, 1944	3rd		Raul Leuterio	KALIBAPI	Re-elected in 1943.		Felipe S. Abeleda	KALIBAPI	Appointed as an ex officio member.	Seats restored			
#	Term of office		Common wealth Congress	Single seat				Seats eliminated							
#	Start	End	Common wealth Congress	Image	Member	Party	Electoral history	Seats eliminated							
=== Mindoro's at-large district for the House of Representatives of the Commonwealth of the Philippines ===								Seats eliminated							
District re-created May 24, 1945.								Seats eliminated							
(4)	June 9, 1945	May 25, 1946	1st		Raul Leuterio	Nacionalista	Re-elected in 1941.	Seats eliminated							
#	Term of office		Congress	Single seat				Seats eliminated							
#	Start	End	Congress	Image	Member	Party	Electoral history	Seats eliminated							
=== Mindoro's at-large district for the House of Representatives of the Philippines ===								Seats eliminated							
(4)	May 25, 1946	January 28, 1952	1st		Raul Leuterio	Liberal	Re-elected in 1946.	Seats eliminated							
(4)	May 25, 1946	January 28, 1952	2nd		Raul Leuterio	Liberal	Re-elected in 1949. Redistricted to Oriental Mindoro's at-large district.	Seats eliminated							
District dissolved into Occidental Mindoro's at-large and Oriental Mindoro's at-large districts.								Seats eliminated							
