= Raul Leuterio =

Filipino lawyer, diplomat, and politician (1904–1970)

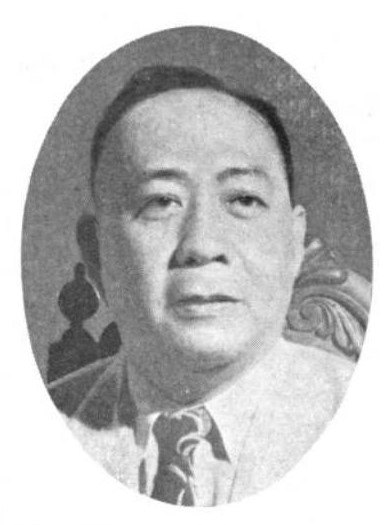
- Leuterio's official portrait during the 2nd Congress

House Majority Leader
- In office May 25, 1946 – December 30, 1953
- Speaker: Eugenio Pérez
- Preceded by: Eugenio Pérez
- Succeeded by: Arturo Tolentino

Member of the Philippine House of Representatives
- In office January 28, 1952 – December 30, 1953
- Preceded by: District created
- Succeeded by: Conrado Morente
- Constituency: Oriental Mindoro's at-large district
- In office June 9, 1945 – January 28, 1952
- Preceded by: Himself (alongside Felipe Abeleda in the Second Republic National Assembly)
- Succeeded by: District abolished
- In office June 5, 1934 – November 15, 1935
- Preceded by: Juan L. Luna
- Succeeded by: Juan L. Luna (in the Commonwealth National Assembly)
- Constituency: Mindoro's at-large district

Member of the National Assembly of the Philippines for Mindoro's at-large district
- In office September 25, 1943 – February 2, 1944 Serving with Felipe Abeleda
- Period: Second Republic
- Preceded by: Himself (in the Commonwealth National Assembly)
- Succeeded by: Himself (in the House of Representatives)
- In office December 30, 1938 – December 30, 1941
- Period: Commonwealth
- Preceded by: Juan L. Luna
- Succeeded by: Himself (alongside Felipe Abeleda in the Second Republic National Assembly)

Philippine Consul General to New York
- In office 1955–1962
- Preceded by: Alejandro Galang (as Acting Principal Officer)
- Succeeded by: Bartolome Umayam

Philippine Ambassador to the Republic of China
- In office July 1966 – February 9, 1970

Personal details
- Born: Raul Tristan Comagon Leuterio; October 24, 1904 Santa Cruz, Manila Philippine Islands
- Died: February 9, 1970 (aged 65) Taipei, Taiwan
- Party: Liberal (1946–1970)
- Other political affiliations: Nacionalista (1934–1943; 1945–1946); KALIBAPI (1943–1944)

Raul Tristan Comagon Leuterio (October 24, 1904 – February 9, 1970) was a Filipino lawyer, diplomat, and politician. He served as representative of Mindoro's at-large congressional district in the House of Representatives and later as assemblyman in the National Assembly across six terms from 1934 to 1952, before representing Oriental Mindoro's at-large congressional district from 1952 to 1953. He served as House majority leader from 1946 to 1953 during the 1st and 2nd Congresses.

== Early life and education ==
Leuterio was born on October 24, 1904, in Santa Cruz, Manila, to former representative Mariano Leuterio and Josefa Comagon. He attended National University, where he completed his secondary education before earning a Bachelor of Arts degree in 1925. He then studied law at the University of the Philippines, graduating with a Bachelor of Laws degree in 1929. He took the Bar examinations in the same year and placed among the top examinees with a rating of 90.7%.

== Career ==
=== House of Representatives ===
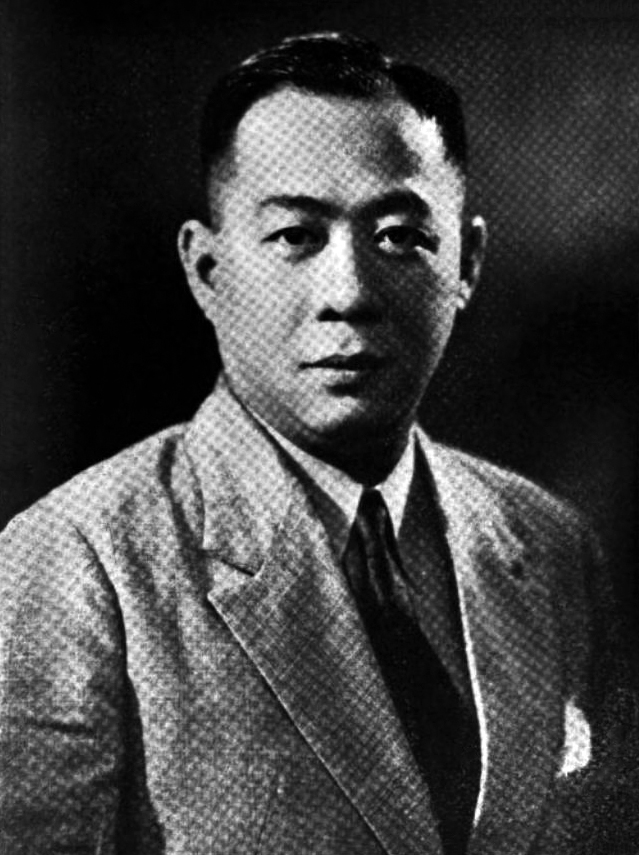
Leuterio in 1941

In 1934, Leuterio was elected to represent Mindoro's at-large congressional district in the House of Representatives, succeeding a seat previously held by his father, Mariano Leuterio, from 1914 to 1932. He served in the 10th Philippine Legislature until the adoption of the 1935 Constitution, which replaced Congress with the National Assembly. He was elected to the 2nd National Assembly in 1938 and, during the Japanese occupation, to the National Assembly of the Second Republic in 1943. Following the liberation of the Philippines, Leuterio joined the Liberal wing of the Nacionalista Party, which later became the Liberal Party, and won three consecutive terms representing Mindoro's at-large district from 1945 to 1953. During the 1st and 2nd Congresses, he served as House majority leader.

Leuterio authored and sponsored what became Republic Act No. 505, signed into law by President Elpidio Quirino on June 13, 1950, which divided the province of Mindoro into Occidental Mindoro and Oriental Mindoro. For this, he became known as the "founding father of Occidental and Oriental Mindoro". Following the province's division, he represented Oriental Mindoro's at-large congressional district from 1952 until the expiration of his term in 1953. Leuterio also sponsored the bill that became Republic Act No. 506, establishing the Mindoro National Agricultural School, now the Mindoro State University.

Leuterio ran for the Senate in 1951 but was unsuccessful, placing 13th among the candidates for the eight contested seats.

=== Diplomatic career ===
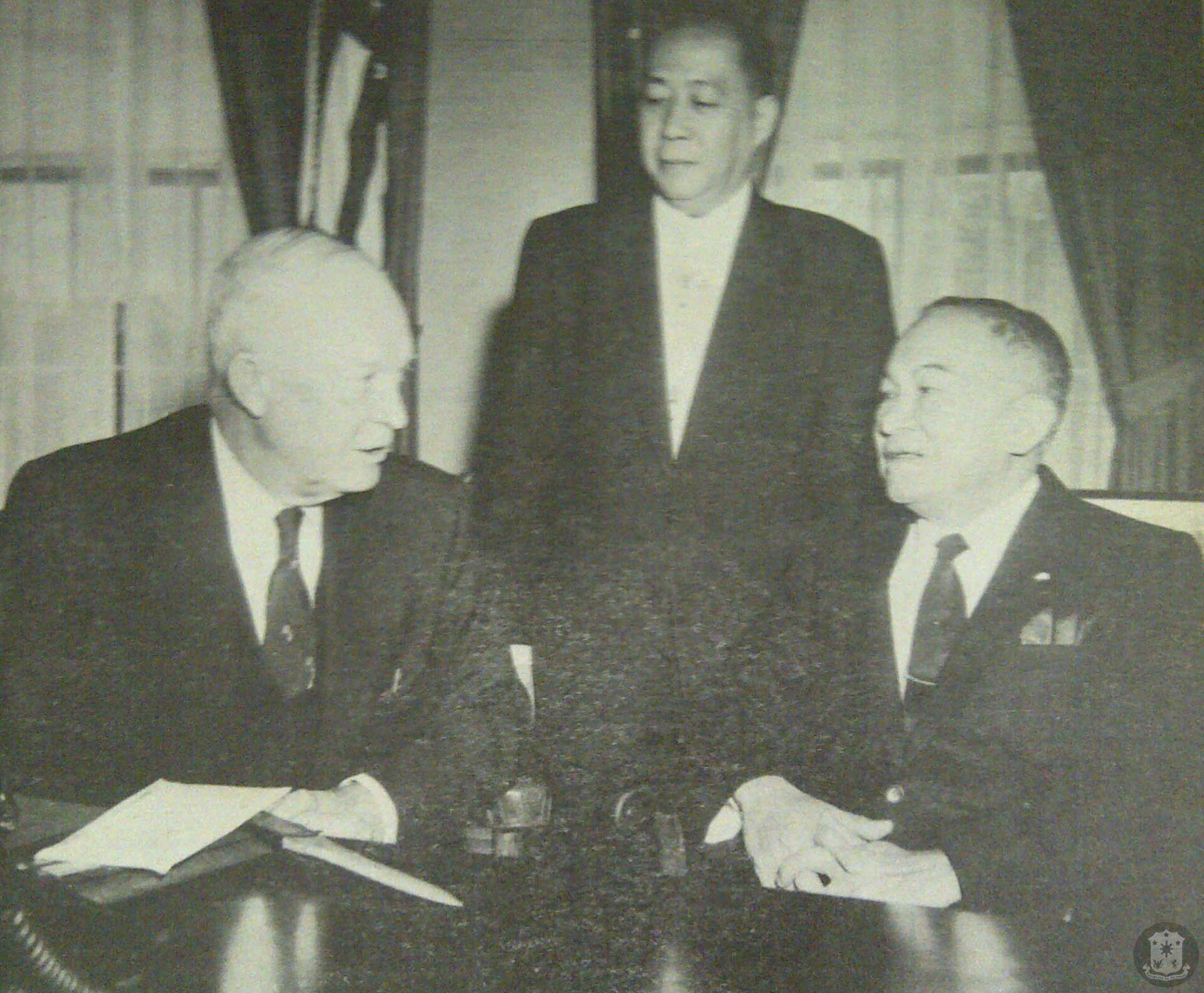
U.S. President Dwight D. Eisenhower (left) receives Senator Jose P. Laurel (right), accompanied by Consul General Raul Leuterio (center), at the White House in 1954.

In October 1946, President Manuel Roxas appointed Leuterio, upon the recommendation of the Department of Foreign Affairs, as a member of the Philippine delegation to the United Nations General Assembly. He sponsored the Philippines' first proposal before the General Assembly, calling for a global conference on freedom of information, and also sponsored a proposal advocating equal rights for women.

Following his congressional service, Leuterio was appointed Philippine consul general in New York by President Ramon Magsaysay in May 1954. He also briefly served as Chargé d'Affaires ad interim at the Embassy of the Philippines in Washington, D.C., from 1954 to 1955. During his tenure as consul general, the Philippine Consulate relocated to the 76th floor of the Empire State Building, where it remained until 1962, when the Department of Foreign Affairs acquired the Kevorkian property on East 66th Street as its new chancery. In July 1966, during the administration of President Ferdinand Marcos, he was appointed Philippine Ambassador to the Republic of China.

=== Death ===
Leuterio died of a heart attack in Taipei, Taiwan, in 1970.

== Electoral history ==
Electoral history of Raul Leuterio
Year	Office	Party	Votes received				Result
Year	Office	Party	Total	%	P.	Swing	Result
1934	Representative (Mindoro at-large)	Nacionalista; Democratico	6,042	—N/a	1st	—N/a	Won
1938	Assemblyman (Mindoro at-large)	Nacionalista	—N/a	—N/a	1st	—N/a	Won
1941	Representative (Mindoro at-large)	Nacionalista	—N/a	—N/a	1st	—N/a	Unopposed
1943	Assemblyman (Mindoro at-large)	KALIBAPI	—N/a	—N/a	1st	—N/a	Won
1946	Representative (Mindoro at-large)	Liberal	—N/a	—N/a	1st	—N/a	Won
1949	Representative (Mindoro at-large)	Liberal	—N/a	—N/a	1st	—N/a	Won
1951	Senator of the Philippines	Liberal	850,216	19.36%	16th	—N/a	Lost

House of Representatives of the Philippines
Preceded by Eugenio Pérez	House Majority Leader; December 30, 1949 – December 30, 1953	Succeeded by Arturo Tolentino
New district	Member of the Philippine House of Representatives for Oriental Mindoro's at-large district January 28, 1952 – December 30, 1953	Succeeded by Conrado Morente
Preceded by Himself (alongside Felipe Abeleda in the Second Republic National Assembly)	Member of the Philippine House of Representatives for Mindoro's at-large district June 9, 1945 – January 28, 1952 (June 5, 1934 – November 15, 1935)	District abolished
Preceded by Juan L. Luna	Member of the Philippine House of Representatives for Mindoro's at-large district June 9, 1945 – January 28, 1952 (June 5, 1934 – November 15, 1935)	Succeeded by Juan L. Luna (in the Commonwealth National Assembly)
Previous: Himself (in the Commonwealth National Assembly)	Member of the Second Republic National Assembly from Mindoro; September 25, 1943 – February 2, 1944; Served alongside: Felipe Abeleda	Succeeded by Himself (in the House of Representatives)
Preceded by Juan L. Luna	Member of the Commonwealth National Assembly for Mindoro's at-large district December 30, 1938 – December 30, 1941	Succeeded by Himself (alongside Felipe Abeleda in the Second Republic National Assembly)
Diplomatic posts
Preceded by Alejandro Galang (as Acting Principal Officer)	Philippine Consul General to New York; 1955–1962	Succeeded by Bartolome Umayam
Unknown	Philippine Ambassador to the Republic of China; July 1966 – February 9, 1970	Unknown
