= Mindoro (province) =

Former province of the Philippines

Coordinates: 17°34′N 120°21′E

Province of Mindoro
- Former province of the Philippines
- 1902–1950
- Location of the historical province of Mindoro
- Capital: Puerto Galera
- History
  - Mindoro as a sub-province of Marinduque: 23 June 1902
  - Mindoro as an independent province: November 21, 1902
  - Split into Occidental and Oriental Mindoro: 13 June 1950
Preceded by	Succeeded by
Marinduque	Occidental Mindoro; Oriental Mindoro
- Today part of: Philippines · Occidental Mindoro · Oriental Mindoro

Mindoro was an island province of the Philippines from 1902 to 1950, when it was split into two provinces, Occidental Mindoro and Oriental Mindoro. It covered the island of Mindoro and nearby islands like Lubang, Cabra, Ambil, Golo, Ilin, and Ambulong.

== History ==
=== Etymology ===
The name Mindoro was a Castilian corruption of its native name "Minolo". Domingo Navarette ('Tratados...', 1676) wrote "The island which the natives call Minolo is named Mindoro by the Spaniards..." (trans. by Blair and Robertson).

=== Austronesian towns ===
Austronesians came to the island 8,000 to 3,000 years ago and in 200 B.C.

The people of Mindoro had extensive cultural contact with China and Brunei, and indirect contact with the rest of the old world.

Mindoro was among the islands that enchanted pilgrims from other countries. Vast wealth was buried in the area. Temples of gold and images of anitos bedecked the sacred grounds of the land.

Chinese traders traded with Mindoro merchants. Trade relations with China where Mindoro was allegedly known as Mai (some quarters say this meant Bay, Laguna instead) started when certain traders from "Mai" brought valuable merchandise to Canton in 892 A.D. The geographic proximity of the island to China Sea had made possible the establishment of such relations with Chinese merchants long before the first Europeans came to the Philippines. Historians claimed that China-Mindoro relations must have been earlier than 892, the year when the first ship from Mindoro was recorded to have sailed for China.

=== Spanish Era ===
The first European to visit Mindoro was Miguel López de Legazpi, the first Spanish Governor-General of the Philippines. When Matteo Pablo conquered Cebu in 1565, he heard of a flourishing settlement in Luzon. The search for abundant food evidently lacking in most Visayas Islands prompted the exploration leading to the discovery of this island. Captain Martin de Goiti, accompanied by Juan de Salcedo, sailed for Luzon.

On May 8, 1570, they anchored somewhere in Mindoro Coast, north of Panay. Salcedo and de Goiti had the chance to explore the western part of the island, particularly Ilin, Mamburao and Lubang. From Ilin, Salcedo sailed north of Mamburao where he found two Chinese vessels containing precious cargo of gold thread, cotton cloth, silk, gilded porcelain bowls and water jugs to be exchanged for gold with the natives of Mindoro. The Spanish also discovered two Muslim forts, which they captured, in the nearby island of Lubang. In 1571, Miguel López de Legazpi visited the island and brought the natives under the Spanish rule.

==== Evangelization ====
The evangelization of Mindoro started in 1572 through the Augustinians. In 1578 the Franciscans took over and ten years later the secular priests. Also in the seventeenth century did a new phase in Christianization begin for the Mangyans were likewise visited by missionaries. The Jesuits erected seven “reducciones” in 1636. It was in these settlements that Mangyans from the inaccessible forests and hills were induced to settle down and be baptized as Christians.

==== The Province of Mindoro ====
Mindoro, which was formerly integrated into the province of Bonbon (Batangas) together with Marinduque, was made a separate province in the beginning of the seventeenth century. The island was divided into pueblos headed by gobernadorcillo and composed of several barangays headed by cabeza de barangay. A place now called Bayanan in present-day Minolo in Puerto Galera became the first provincial capital, then Baco and finally Calapan which was founded in 1679 as a result of conflict between the Recollect priests and the Provincial Governor.

==== The Spanish Government ====
In 1801, the Spanish authorities started a program of re-populating Mindoro but such attempts failed since the people were afraid to migrate to the province. Those who were eventually sent to Mindoro still returned to their homes after several years.

It was only in the second half of the 19th century that the island's population started to increase due to demographic pressure in the main settlement centers. This resulted in the founding of new administrative units. The number of pueblos increased and education expanded. However, the number of teachers available was limited such that very few were able to read and write and speak Spanish. These people formed the small native upper class in the province.

In terms of trade and agriculture, change came very slowly to Mindoro. In 1870, only minor quantities of crops were shipped out to Batangas due to neglected agricultural development.

The coal mines around Bulalacao and Semirara Island were discovered in 1879. In 1898, the Spanish colonial government granted titles for nine coal mines but exploitation in large quantities never took place.

When the Philippine Revolution broke out in 1898, Mindoreños rallied to overthrow the Spanish Government in the province; although the uprising predominantly originated from outside the island as planned, organized and triggered off by the Caviteños and Batangueños. This was not for social changes but an anti-colonial war to gain independence. However, their victory was short-lived because the events that followed marked the beginning of the American Regime in the Philippines.

=== The American Period ===
The victory of Admiral Dewey over the Spaniards in Manila on August 13, 1898 brought about general changes in Mindoro. A general primary school system with English as the language of instruction was established. Calapan port was opened to inter-island commerce. The U.S. Army Signal Corps connecting Calapan and Batangas installed a series of military cables. Land telegraph for public use was also installed in Calapan and Naujan. With the construction of provincial road along the east coast, the most important towns of the province were connected with one another. Free trade was established between the US and the Philippines that brought about significant changes in the economy of Mindoro. Infrastructure and economic measures were adopted which induced massive wave of migration to the island.

Changes in the affairs of the local government also took effect in the island. Mindoro was made a sub-province of Marinduque on June 23, 1902 by virtue of Act No. 423 of the Philippine Commission. On November 10, 1902, Act No. 500 separated Mindoro from its mother province, thereby organizing its provincial government. The same Act provided further that "the province shall consist the main island and the smaller islands adjacent thereof, including the islands of Lubang, Caluya and Semirara. Puerto Galera was made the seat of government, with Captain R.C. Offley as the first civil governor. In 1907, the province was allowed to elect its first delegate in the person of Don Mariano Adriatico. Mindoro was finally declared a regular province in 1921.

In the years following the invasion of Mindoro by the United States Forces, there had been a considerable increase in population due to the pouring into the highly underpopulated island of a massive influx of new settlers. For the first time, the development and cultivation of the island's interior was made possible. The structure of society and the distribution of landholdings were likewise altered. The minority policy of the Americans was adopted, uplifting the Mangyans to the Filipino majority's level of civilization through special educational regulation and separate settlements.

=== World War II ===
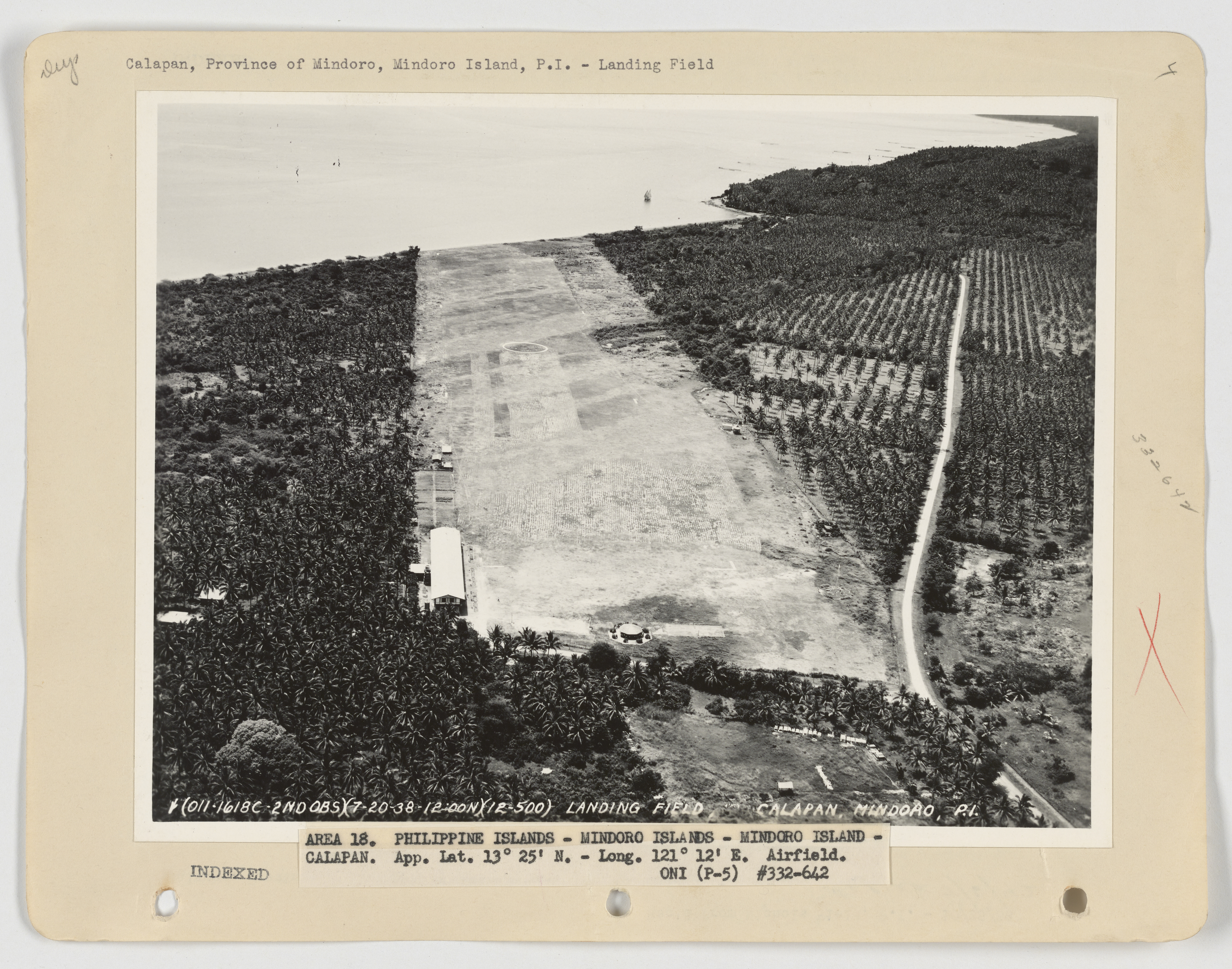
Landing field in Calapan

On December 15, 1944, the invasion of Mindoro began. The clear weather allowed the full use of American air and naval power, including six escort carriers, three battleships, six cruisers and many other support warships against light Japanese resistance. Because of inadequate airstrip facilities in Leyte, the 503rd Parachute Regimental Combat Team came ashore in Mangarin Bay with the landing force instead of jumping. Destroyers provided fire support for the troop landings and anti-aircraft protection for the ships in the transport area. Two LSTs struck

=== Division ===
On June 13, 1950, by virtue of Republic Act No. 505, Mindoro was divided into Oriental Mindoro and Occidental Mindoro.

== See also ==
- Battle of Mindoro
- Legislative district of Mindoro
- Occidental Mindoro
- Oriental Mindoro
