= 1941 Philippine general election =

- November 11, 1941
- Presidential election
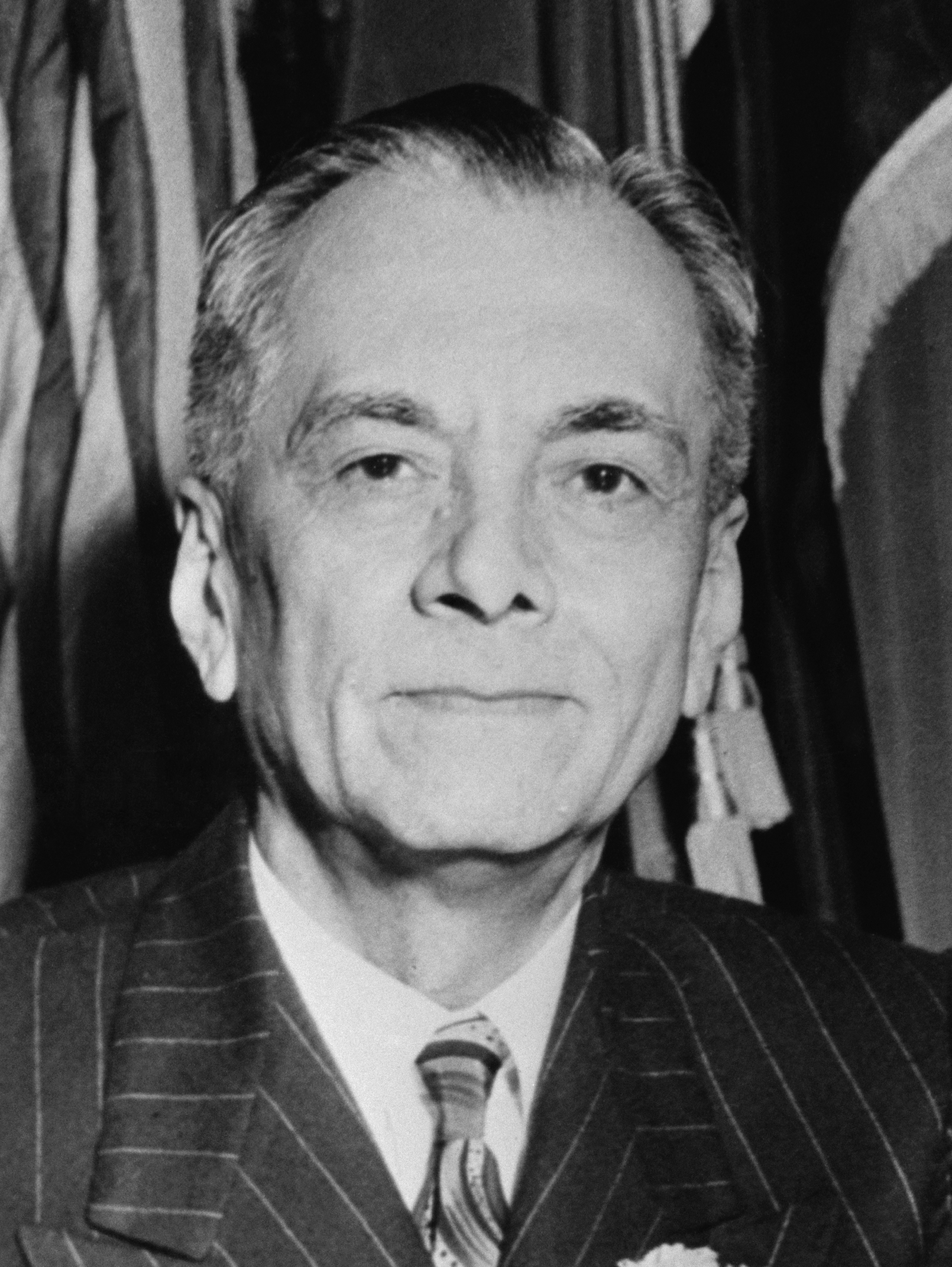

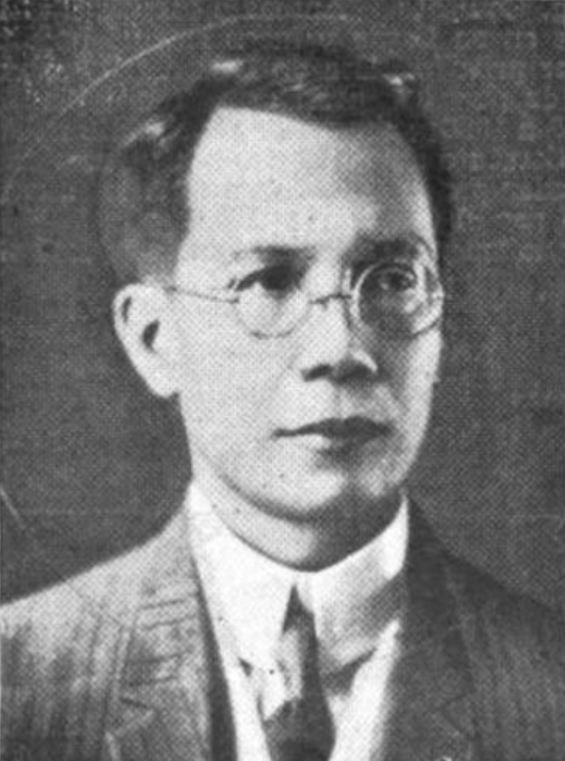
Candidate	Manuel L. Quezon	Juan Sumulong
Party	Nacionalista	Popular Front
Running mate	Sergio Osmeña	Emilio Javier
Popular vote	1,340,320	298,608
Percentage	80.13%	17.85%
President before election
Manuel L. Quezon
Nacionalista
Elected President
Manuel L. Quezon
Nacionalista
- Vice presidential election
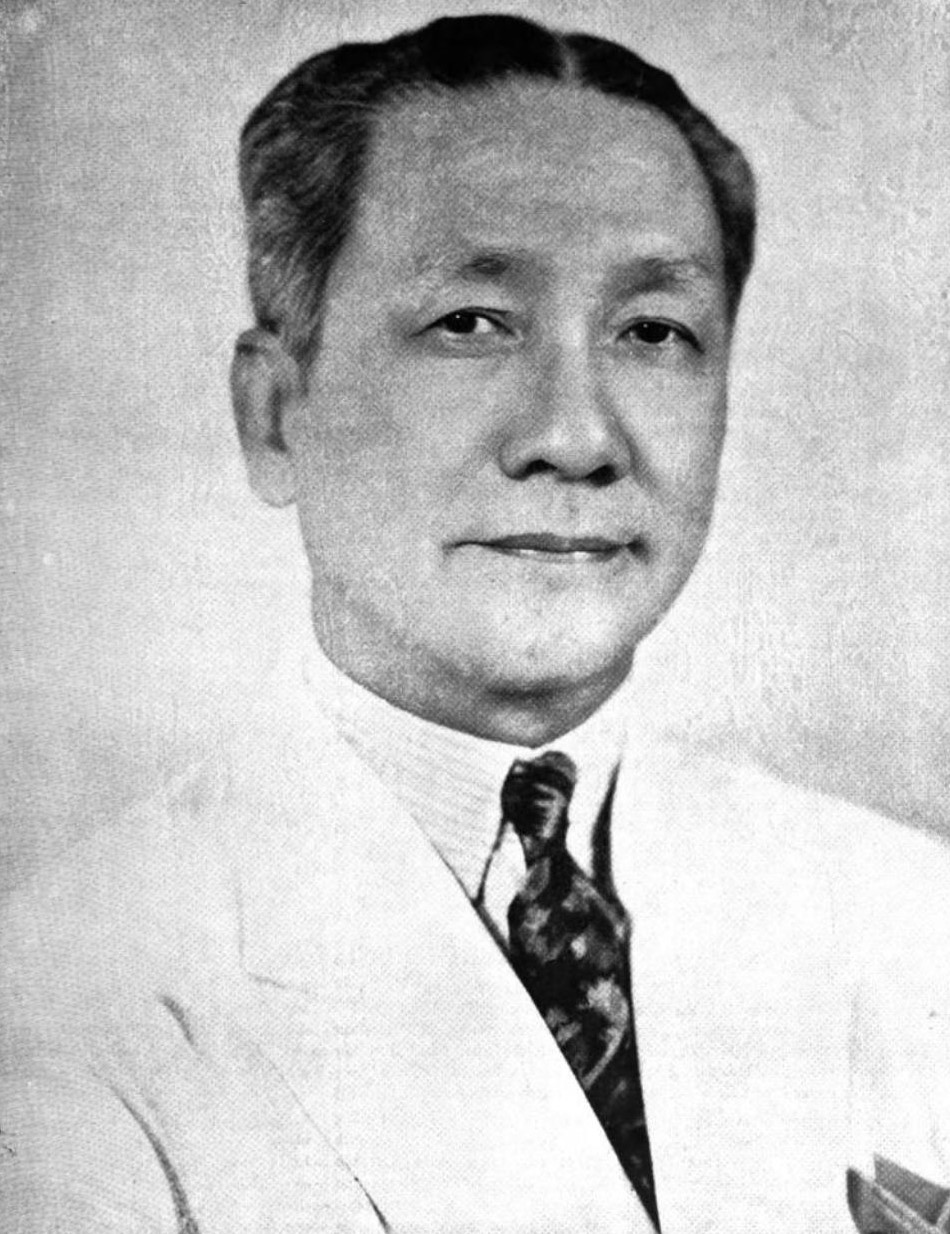

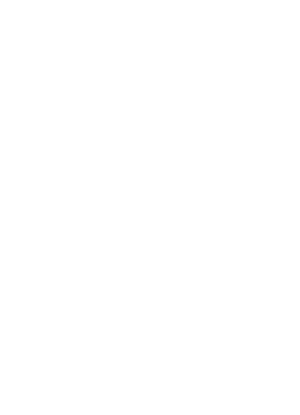
Candidate	Sergio Osmeña	Emilio Javier
Party	Nacionalista	Popular Front
Popular vote	1,445,897	124,035
Percentage	90.24%	7.74%
Vice President before election
Sergio Osmeña
Nacionalista
Elected Vice President
Sergio Osmeña
Nacionalista
- Senate election

24 (of the 24) seats to the Senate of the Philippines 24 seats needed for a majority
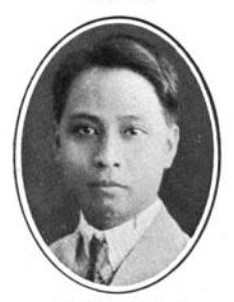

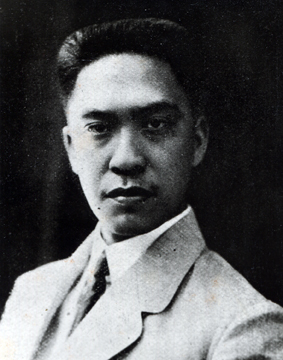

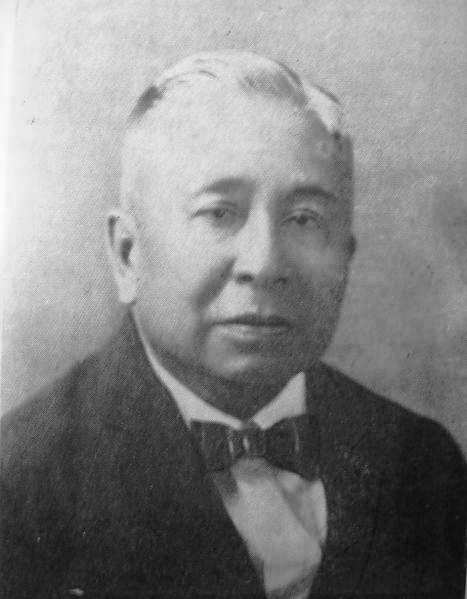
	First party	Second party	Third party
Leader	Manuel Roxas	Vicente Sotto	Isabelo de los Reyes
Party	Nacionalista	Popular Front (Sumulong wing)	Popular Front (Abad Santos wing)
Seats won	24	0	0
Popular vote	23,385,017	2,888,103	1,581,896
Percentage	79.99	9.88	5.41
Senate President before election
Defunct
Elected Senate President
Manuel Roxas
Nacionalista
- House of Representatives election

All 98 seats in the House of Representatives of the Philippines 50 seats needed for a majority
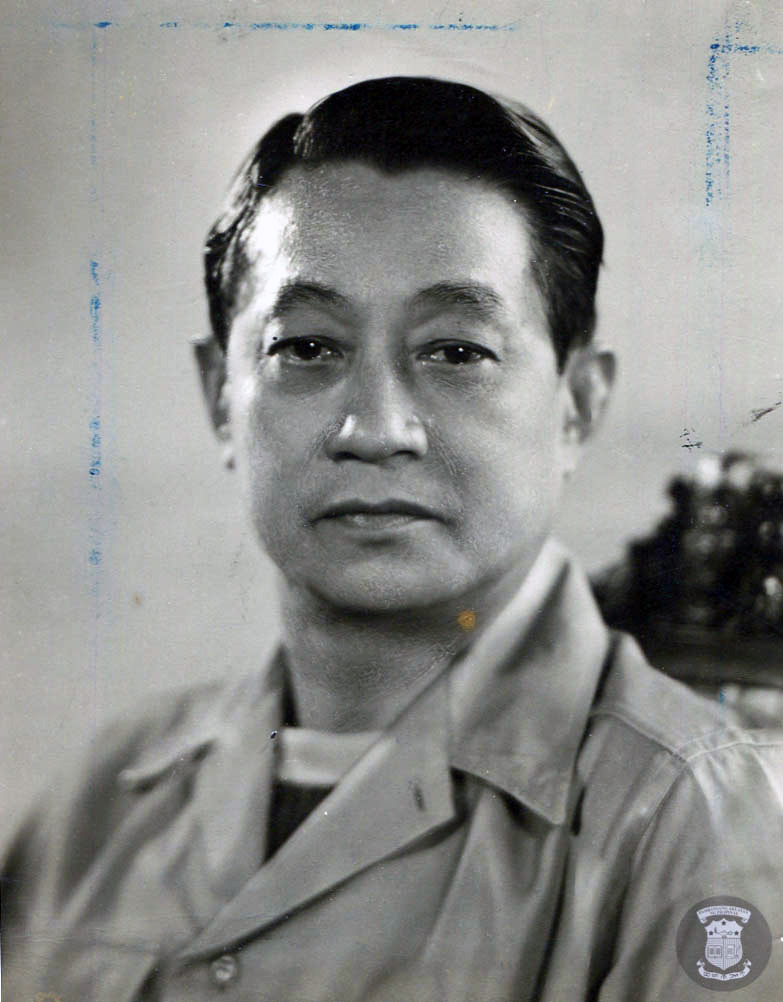
	First party	Second party
Leader	José Zulueta	Engracio Clemeña
Party	Nacionalista	Popular Front
Leader's seat	Negros Occidental's–3rd	Manila–1st
Seats won	94	2
Seat change	▼4	▲2
Speaker before election
José Yulo
Nacionalista
Elected Speaker
José Zulueta
Nacionalista

General elections were held in the Philippines on November 11, 1941. Incumbent President Manuel Luis Quezon won an unprecedented second partial term as President of the Philippines via a landslide. His running mate, Vice President Sergio Osmeña also won via landslide. The elected officials however, did not serve their terms from 1942 to 1945 due to World War II. In 1943, a Japanese-sponsored Republic was established and appointed José P. Laurel as president. From 1943 to 1945, the Philippines had two presidents. Quezon died in 1944 due to tuberculosis and was replaced by Sergio Osmeña.

== Candidates ==
=== Nacionalista Party ===
President	Manuel L. Quezon	Nacionalista
Vice president	Sergio Osmeña Sr	Nacionalista
Senators	Alauya Alonto (Sultan Sa Ramain)	Nacionalista
Senators	Melecio Arranz	Nacionalista
Senators	Nicolas Buendia	Nacionalista
Senators	Mariano Jesus Cuenco	Nacionalista
Senators	Esteban de la Rama	Nacionalista
Senators	Antonio de las Alas	Nacionalista
Senators	Ramon J. Fernandez	Nacionalista
Senators	Carlos P. Garcia	Nacionalista
Senators	Pedro Hernaez	Nacionalista
Senators	Domingo Imperial	Nacionalista
Senators	Vicente Madrigal	Nacionalista
Senators	Daniel Maramba	Nacionalista
Senators	Rafael Martinez	Nacionalista
Senators	José Ozámiz	Nacionalista
Senators	Quintin Paredes	Nacionalista
Senators	Elpidio Quirino	Nacionalista
Senators	Vicente Rama	Nacionalista
Senators	Claro M. Recto	Nacionalista
Senators	Manuel A. Roxas I	Nacionalista
Senators	Eulogio A. Rodriguez Sr	Nacionalista
Senators	Proceso Sebastian	Nacionalista
Senators	Emiliano Tria Tirona	Nacionalista
Senators	Ramon Torres	Nacionalista
Senators	Jose Yulo	Nacionalista

=== Popular Front (Sumulong Wing) ===
President	Juan Sumulong Sr	Popular Front (Sumulong)
Vice president	Emilio M. Javier	Popular Front (Sumulong)
Senators	Jose Alejandrino Sr.	Popular Front (Sumulong)
Senators	Jose M. Bayot	Popular Front (Sumulong)
Senators	Jose Casal	Popular Front (Sumulong)
Senators	Felicidad Climaco	Popular Front (Sumulong)
Senators	Pedro Coleto	Popular Front (Sumulong)
Senators	Jose Gamboa	Popular Front (Sumulong)
Senators	Fernando Gardoqui	Popular Front (Sumulong)
Senators	Eliseo Imzon	Popular Front (Sumulong)
Senators	Melchor Lagasca	Popular Front (Sumulong)
Senators	Julio A. Llorente	Popular Front (Sumulong)
Senators	Marcelino Lontok	Popular Front (Sumulong)
Senators	Sixto Lopez	Popular Front (Sumulong)
Senators	Mamerto Manalo	Popular Front (Sumulong)
Senators	Angel Marin	Popular Front (Sumulong)
Senators	Emilio Medina	Popular Front (Sumulong)
Senators	Raymundo Melliza	Popular Front (Sumulong)
Senators	Jose Padilla Sr.	Popular Front (Sumulong)
Senators	Jose Palarca Sr	Popular Front (Sumulong)
Senators	Francisco Ramos	Popular Front (Sumulong)
Senators	Pablo Rocha	Popular Front (Sumulong)
Senators	Geronimo Santiago	Popular Front (Sumulong)
Senators	Filemon Sotto	Popular Front (Sumulong)
Senators	Vicente Sotto Sr.	Popular Front (Sumulong)
Senators	Juan Villamor	Popular Front (Sumulong)

=== Popular Front (Abad Santos Wing) ===
President	Pedro Abad Santos (withdrew)	Popular Front (Abad Santos)
Vice president	Pilar V. Aglipay	Republican
Senators	Jose Alejandrino Sr (guest)	Popular Front (Sumulong)
Senators	Angel Ancajas	Popular Front (Abad Santos)
Senators	Mariano Balgos	Popular Front (Abad Santos)
Senators	Isabelo Caballero	Popular Front (Abad Santos)
Senators	Pedro C. Castro	Popular Front (Abad Santos)
Senators	Severo Dava	Popular Front (Abad Santos)
Senators	Mateo del Castillo	Popular Front (Abad Santos)
Senators	Isabelo delos Reyes Jr.	Popular Front (Abad Santos)
Senators	Francisco Dematera	Popular Front (Abad Santos)
Senators	Lino Dizon	Popular Front (Abad Santos)
Senators	Crisanto Evangelista	Popular Front (Abad Santos)
Senators	Juan Feleo	Popular Front (Abad Santos)
Senators	Severino Izon	Popular Front (Abad Santos)
Senators	Manuel Joven	Popular Front (Abad Santos)
Senators	Ignacio Nabong (withdrew)	Popular Front (Abad Santos)
Senators	Norberto Nabong	Popular Front (Abad Santos)
Senators	Jose M. Nava	Popular Front (Abad Santos)
Senators	Jose Padilla Sr. (guest)	Popular Front (Sumulong)
Senators	Datu Tampugao Pagayao	Popular Front (Abad Santos)
Senators	Antonio Paguia	Popular Front (Abad Santos)
Senators	Narcisa Paguibitan	Popular Front (Abad Santos)
Senators	Antonio Salvador	Popular Front (Abad Santos)
Senators	Hadji Usman	Popular Front (Abad Santos)

=== Ganap Party (Partido Ganap de Filipinas) ===
President	Celerino Tiongco	Ganap
Vice president	Pilar V. Aglipay (guest)	Republican
Senators	Wenceslao Asistido	Ganap
Senators	Gaudencio Bautista	Ganap
Senators	Sixto Bedrus	Ganap
Senators	Ciriaco V. Campomanes	Ganap
Senators	Marcelino Chavez	Ganap
Senators	Esteban Coruna	Ganap
Senators	Alfredo Dumlao	Ganap
Senators	Joaquin Flavier	Ganap
Senators	Jose Jabeon	Ganap
Senators	Mariano Lumbre	Ganap
Senators	Fernando Mangson	Ganap
Senators	Samson Palomares	Ganap
Senators	Vicente Pamatinat	Ganap
Senators	Antonio Ramos	Ganap
Senators	Perfecto Reyes	Ganap
Senators	Francisco Robles	Ganap
Senators	Antipas Soriano	Ganap
Senators	Florentino Subayno	Ganap
Senators	Aurelio Tankeko	Ganap
Senators	Eulalio Tolentino	Ganap
Senators	Ricardo Valdivia	Ganap
Senators	Prudencio Vega	Ganap
Senators	Pedro Zaragosa	Ganap

=== Partido Modernista ===
President	Hilario C. Moncado	Partido Modernista
Vice president	Emilio F. Aguinaldo Sr (withdrew)	Partido Modernista
Senators	Pedro Arteche	Partido Modernista
Senators	Honorio Caringal (withdrew)	Partido Modernista
Senators	Vicente del Rosario	Partido Modernista
Senators	Mariano delos Santos	Partido Modernista
Senators	Francisco Afan Delgado	Partido Modernista
Senators	Crisanto Evangelista (guest)	Popular Front (Abad Santos Wing)
Senators	Santiago Fonacier	Partido Modernista
Senators	Melchor Lagasca (guest)	Popular Front (Sumulong wing)
Senators	Manuel Luz	Partido Modernista
Senators	Josefa Martinez	Partido Modernista
Senators	Flora Ylagan	Partido Modernista

=== Independent candidates ===
President	Ernesto T. Belleza	Independent
President	Hermogenes Dumpit	Independent
President	Veronica Miciano	Independent
Vice president	Pedro Yabut	Independent
Senator	Manuel Briones	Independent

== Results ==
=== President ===
Candidate	Party	Votes	%
Manuel L. Quezon	Nacionalista Party	1,340,320	80.14
Juan Sumulong	Popular Front (Sumulong wing) (Note: The Popular Front was split into two wings: those who supported Pedro Abad Santos or the "Abad Santos wing" and those who supported Juan Sumulong or the "Sumulong wing".)	298,608	17.85
Celerino Tiongco I	Ganap Party	22,474	1.34
Hilario Moncado	Modernist Party	10,726	0.64
Hermogenes Dumpit	Independent	298	0.02
Veronica Miciano	Independent	62	0.00
Ernesto T. Belleza	Independent	16	0.00
Pedro Abad Santos (Note: Withdrew)	Popular Front (Abad Santos wing)	0	0.00
Total		1,672,504	100.00

=== Vice president ===
Candidate	Party	Votes	%
Sergio Osmeña	Nacionalista Party	1,445,897	90.24
Emilio Javier	Popular Front (Sumulong wing) (Note: The Popular Front was split into two wings: those who supported Pedro Abad Santos or the "Abad Santos wing" and those who supported Juan Sumulong or the "Sumulong wing".)	124,035	7.74
Pilar Aglipay	Republican Party	32,148	2.01
Pedro Yabut	Independent	123	0.01
Emilio Aguinaldo (Note: Withdrew)	Modernist Party	0	0.00
Total		1,602,203	100.00

=== Senate ===
Candidate	Party	Votes	%
Claro M. Recto (Note: Detained for collaboration with the Japanese and were not able to take office.)	Nacionalista Party	1,084,003	64.81
Manuel Roxas	Nacionalista Party	1,076,389	64.36
Quintin Paredes	Nacionalista Party	1,046,715	62.58
Jose Yulo	Nacionalista Party	1,035,025	61.88
Elpidio Quirino	Nacionalista Party	1,013,095	60.57
Antonio de las Alas	Nacionalista Party	1,002,853	59.96
Emiliano Tria Tirona	Nacionalista Party	983,740	58.82
Eulogio Rodriguez	Nacionalista Party	982,144	58.72
Vicente Madrigal	Nacionalista Party	977,119	58.42
Mariano Jesús Cuenco	Nacionalista Party	974,683	58.28
Melecio Arranz	Nacionalista Party	973,403	58.20
Carlos P. Garcia	Nacionalista Party	972,034	58.12
Ramon Torres	Nacionalista Party	962,836	57.57
Domingo Imperial	Nacionalista Party	959,633	57.38
Daniel Maramba	Nacionalista Party	959,390	57.36
Pedro Hernaez	Nacionalista Party	949,238	56.76
Ramón J. Fernández	Nacionalista Party	947,798	56.67
José Ozámiz	Nacionalista Party	947,106	56.63
Nicolas Buendia	Nacionalista Party	944,315	56.46
Esteban de la Rama	Nacionalista Party	937,746	56.07
Vicente Rama	Nacionalista Party	934,254	55.86
Proceso Sebastian	Nacionalista Party	930,179	55.62
Alauya Alonto	Nacionalista Party	919,348	54.97
Rafael Martinez (Note: Substituted for Norberto Romualdez who died a few days before the election.)	Nacionalista Party	871,971	52.14
Vicente Sotto	Popular Front (Sumulong wing) (Note: The Popular Front was split into two wings: those who supported Pedro Abad Santos or the "Abad Santos wing" and those who supported Juan Sumulong or the "Sumulong wing".)	229,276	13.71
Filemon Sotto	Popular Front (Sumulong wing)	191,815	11.47
Jose Alejandrino	Popular Front (Sumulong wing)	128,077	7.66
Jose Padilla Sr.	Popular Front (Sumulong wing)	127,557	7.63
Emilio Medina	Popular Front (Sumulong wing)	125,896	7.53
Eliseo Imzon	Popular Front (Sumulong wing)	123,540	7.39
Geronimo Santiago	Popular Front (Sumulong wing)	120,005	7.18
Manuel Briones	Independent	118,804	7.10
Isabelo delos Reyes Jr.	Popular Front (Abad Santos wing)	117,339	7.02
Sixto Lopez	Popular Front (Sumulong wing)	116,888	6.99
Juan Villamor	Popular Front (Sumulong wing)	116,437	6.96
Jose Palarca Sr.	Popular Front (Sumulong wing)	115,087	6.88
Raymundo Melliza	Popular Front (Sumulong wing)	114,987	6.88
Arsenio Suazo	Popular Front (Sumulong wing)	110,210	6.59
Angel Marin	Popular Front (Sumulong wing)	110,007	6.58
Jose M. Bayot	Popular Front (Sumulong wing)	109,667	6.56
Felicidad Climaco	Popular Front (Sumulong wing)	109,610	6.55
Julio A. Llorente	Popular Front (Sumulong wing)	109,480	6.55
Jose Gamboa	Popular Front (Sumulong wing)	108,798	6.51
Pedro Coleto	Popular Front (Sumulong wing)	107,365	6.42
Marcelino Lontok	Popular Front (Sumulong wing)	104,117	6.23
Mamerto Manalo	Popular Front (Sumulong wing)	102,798	6.15
Fernando Gardoqui	Popular Front (Sumulong wing)	99,889	5.97
Crisanto Evangelista	Popular Front (Abad Santos wing)	97,554	5.83
Norberto Nabong	Popular Front (Abad Santos wing)	97,231	5.81
Juan Feleo	Popular Front (Abad Santos wing)	96,740	5.78
Jose M. Nava	Popular Front (Abad Santos wing)	94,887	5.67
Angel Ancajas	Popular Front (Abad Santos wing)	91,005	5.44
Lino Dizon	Popular Front (Abad Santos wing)	88,547	5.29
Jose Casal	Popular Front (Sumulong wing)	85,403	5.11
Pablo Rocha	Popular Front (Sumulong wing)	84,996	5.08
Melchor Lagasca	Popular Front (Sumulong wing)	82,009	4.90
Antonio Paguia	Popular Front (Abad Santos wing)	80,468	4.81
Mateo del Castillo	Popular Front (Abad Santos wing)	79,368	4.75
Severino Izon	Popular Front (Abad Santos wing)	76,682	4.58
Antonio Salvador	Popular Front (Abad Santos wing)	76,413	4.57
Hadji Usman	Popular Front (Abad Santos wing)	76,397	4.57
Pedro C. Castro	Popular Front (Abad Santos wing)	75,558	4.52
Francisco Dematera	Popular Front (Abad Santos wing)	68,773	4.11
Isabello Caballero	Popular Front (Abad Santos wing)	67,588	4.04
Perfecto Reyes	Ganap Party	65,002	3.89
Mariano P. Balgos	Popular Front (Abad Santos wing)	64,799	3.87
Alfredo Dumlao	Ganap Party	64,553	3.86
Manuel Joven	Popular Front (Abad Santos wing)	62,006	3.71
Severo Dava	Popular Front (Abad Santos wing)	61,956	3.70
Ciriaco V. Campomanes	Ganap Party	57,440	3.43
Vicente Pamatinat	Ganap Party	55,211	3.30
Ricardo Valdivia	Ganap Party	55,044	3.29
Narcisa Paguibitan	Popular Front (Abad Santos wing)	54,632	3.27
Francisco Ramos	Popular Front (Sumulong wing)	54,189	3.24
Datu Tampugao Pagayao	Popular Front (Abad Santos wing)	53,953	3.23
Samson Palomares	Ganap Party	50,489	3.02
Esteban Coruna	Ganap Party	50,113	3.00
Fernando Mangson	Ganap Party	48,770	2.92
Eulalio Tolentino	Ganap Party	48,502	2.90
Prudencio Vega	Ganap Party	47,822	2.86
Antipas Soriano	Ganap Party	47,347	2.83
Francisco Robles	Ganap Party	46,883	2.80
Jose Jabeon	Ganap Party	45,984	2.75
Joaquin Flavier	Ganap Party	44,980	2.69
Pedro Zaragosa	Ganap Party	44,669	2.67
Francisco Afan Delgado	Modernist Party	41,890	2.50
Antonio Ramos	Ganap Party	40,008	2.39
Aurelio Tankeko	Ganap Party	37,965	2.27
Sixto Bedrus	Ganap Party	37,714	2.25
Santiago Fonacier	Modernist Party	37,503	2.24
Gaudencio Bautista	Ganap Party	36,912	2.21
Mariano Lumbre	Ganap Party	36,715	2.20
Flora Ylagan	Modernist Party	34,730	2.08
Wenceslao Asistido	Ganap Party	32,803	1.96
Marcelino Chavez	Ganap Party	30,058	1.80
Florentino Subayno	Ganap Party	28,447	1.70
Josefina Martinez	Modernist Party	25,596	1.53
Pedro Arteche	Modernist Party	23,441	1.40
Manuel Luz	Modernist Party	20,004	1.20
Vicente del Rosario	Modernist Party	13,259	0.79
Mariano delos Santos	Modernist Party	11,446	0.68
Honorio Caringal (Note: Withdrew)	Modernist Party	0	0.00
Ignacio Nabong	Popular Front (Abad Santos wing)	0	0.00
Total		29,235,120	100.00
Total votes		1,672,504	–

=== House of Representatives ===
Party	Seats	+/–
Nacionalista Party	94	−4
Popular Front	2	+1
Partido Democrata Nacional	1	+1
Young Philippines	1	+1
Total	98	0
Source: Teehankee and PCDSPO

== See also ==
- 1st Congress of the Commonwealth of the Philippines
- 1941 Philippine Senate elections
- 1941 Philippine House of Representatives elections
- Commission on Elections
- Politics of the Philippines
- Philippine elections
