= 1941 Philippine vice presidential election =

2nd election of the Philippine vice president

- November 11, 1941
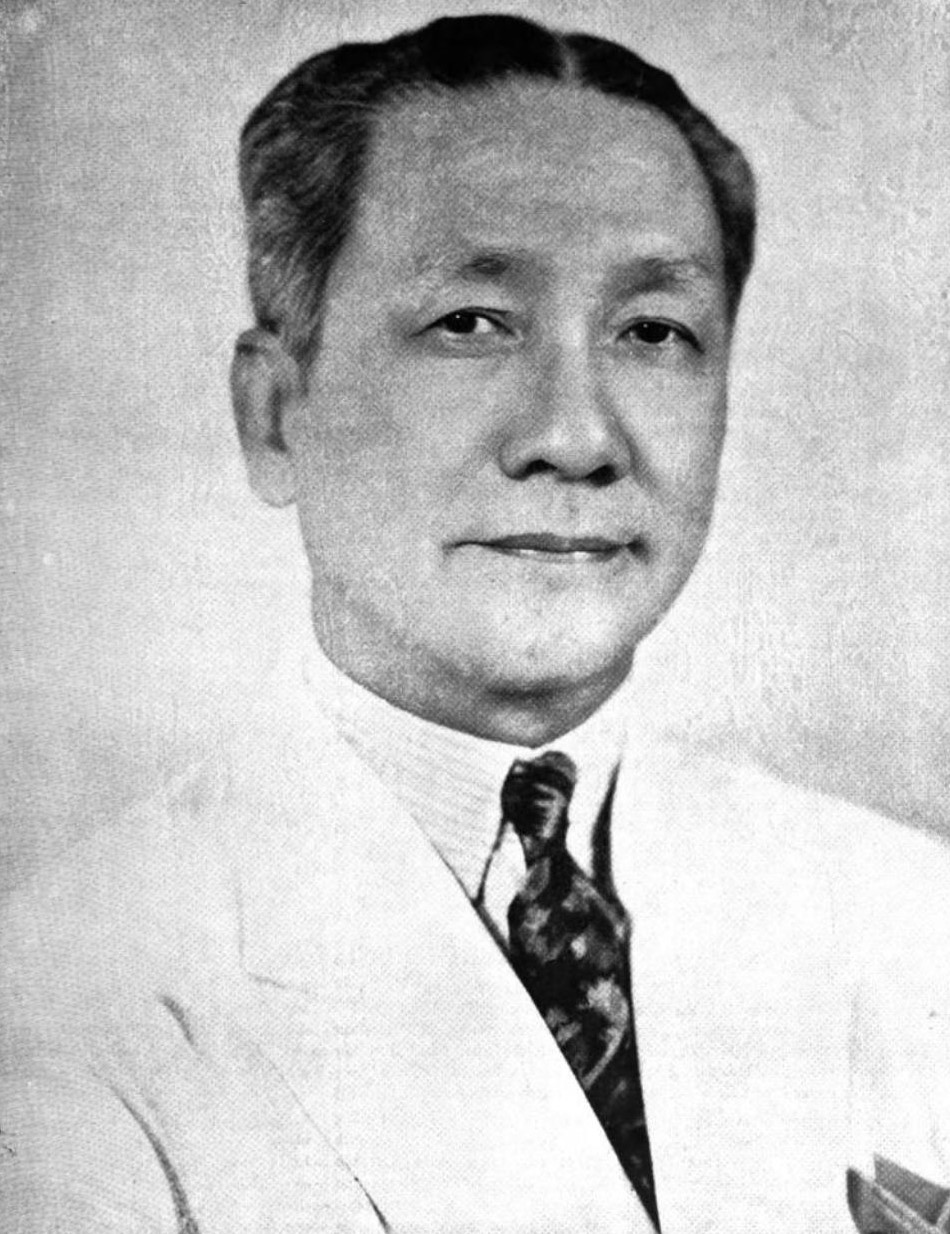

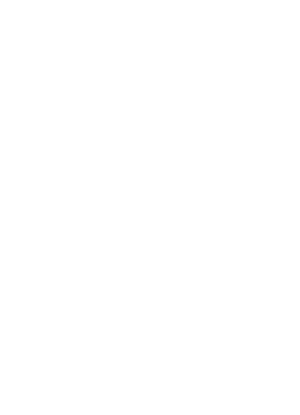
Nominee	Sergio Osmeña	Emilio Javier
Party	Nacionalista	Popular Front
Running mate	Manuel L. Quezon	Juan Sumulong
Popular vote	1,445,897	124,035
Percentage	90.24%	7.74%
Vice President before election
Sergio Osmeña
Nacionalista
Elected Vice President
Sergio Osmeña
Nacionalista

Vice presidential elections were held in the Philippines on November 11, 1941, twenty-seven days before the Attack on Pearl Harbor, which led to the subsequent Japanese invasion of the Philippines. Incumbent Vice President Sergio Osmeña won through a landslide. This was the second vice presidential election in the country.

Osmeña and incumbent president Manuel L. Quezon would not complete their respective terms due to the country's entanglement in World War II as well as the former's death in 1944, which would see Osmeña's ascension to the presidency. A Japanese-sponsored republic was established In 1943, which elected Jose P. Laurel as their president, creating a two-year period in which there were two claimants to the presidency.

These paragraphs are an excerpt from 1941 Philippine presidential election § Candidates.[edit]

== Candidates ==
The main contenders in this election were Manuel L. Quezon, the incumbent president of the Commonwealth of the Philippines, under the ruling Nacionalista Party, with incumbent Vice President Sergio Osmeña as his running mate; and Senator Juan Sumulong of the Popular Front-Sumulong Wing (also called Pagkakaisa ng Bayan), with Dr. Emilio M. Javier as his vice presidential candidate. Other presidential-vice presidential tandems include Pedro Abad Santos and Pilar V. Aglipay of the Popular Front-Abad Santos Wing and Republican Party, respectively; Celerino Tiongco I of the Partido Ganap de Filipinas, with Aglipay as his guest running mate; and Hilario C. Moncado of the Partido Modernista and Partido Liberal de Filipinas, with former president Emilio Aguinaldo as his running mate. Abad Santos and Aguinaldo later withdrew their candidacies for president and vice president, respectively. Other candidates include Ernesto Tupas Belleza, Hermogenes Dumpit and Veronica Miciano, independent presidential candidates, and Pedro Yabut, an independent running for vice president.

== Results ==
Osmeña did a better electoral performance than in 1935.

Candidate	Party	Votes	%
Sergio Osmeña	Nacionalista Party	1,445,897	90.24
Emilio Javier	Popular Front (Sumulong wing) (Note: The Popular Front was split into two wings: those who supported Pedro Abad Santos or the "Abad Santos wing" and those who supported Juan Sumulong or the "Sumulong wing".)	124,035	7.74
Pilar Aglipay	Republican Party	32,148	2.01
Pedro Yabut	Independent	123	0.01
Emilio Aguinaldo (Note: Withdrew)	Modernist Party	0	0.00
Total		1,602,203	100.00

Popular vote
Osmeña	90.24%
Javier	7.74%
Others	2.01%
