= 1934 Philippine Senate elections =

7th Philippine senatorial election

- June 5, 1934

11 of the 24 seats in the Philippine Senate
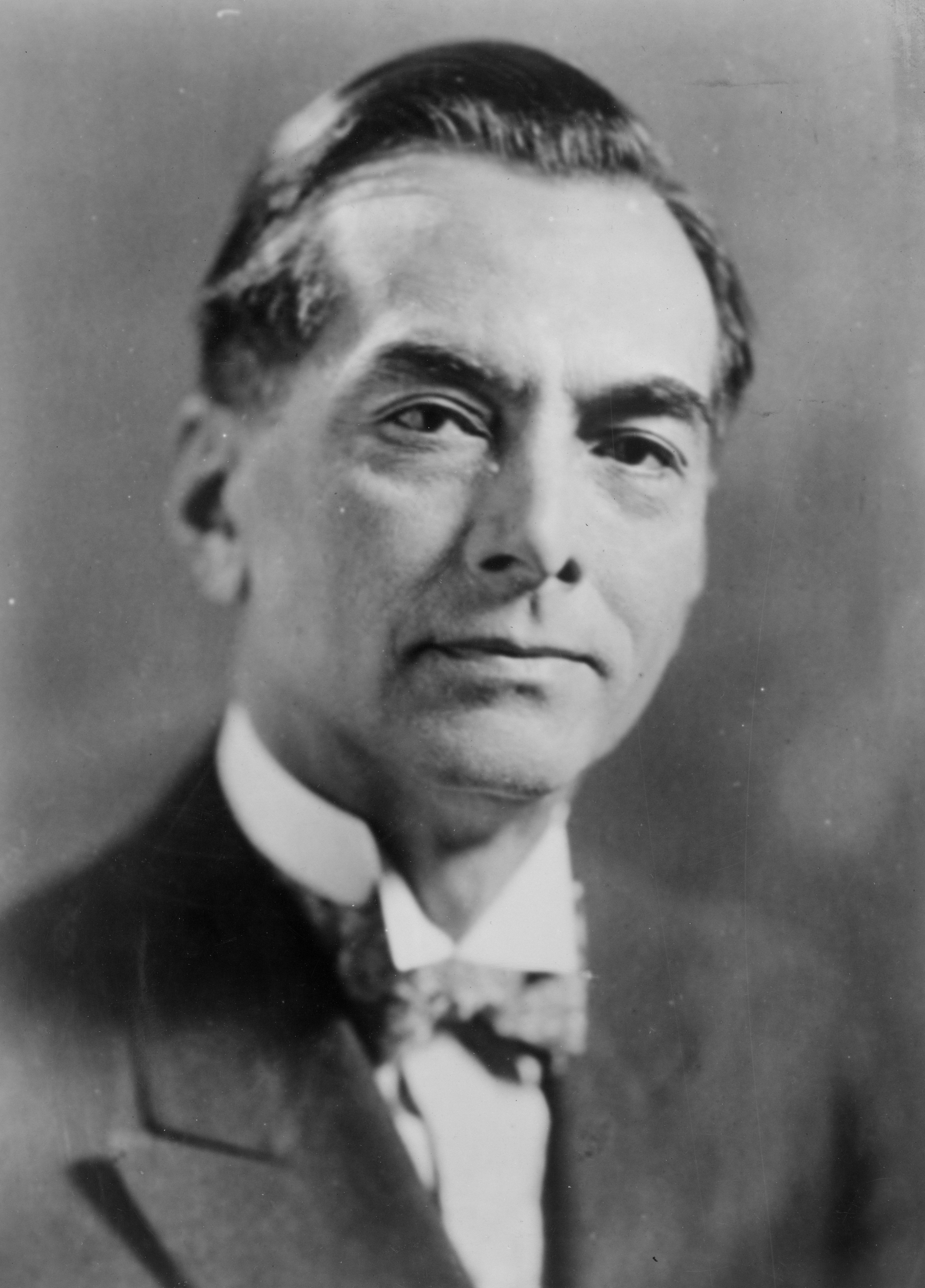

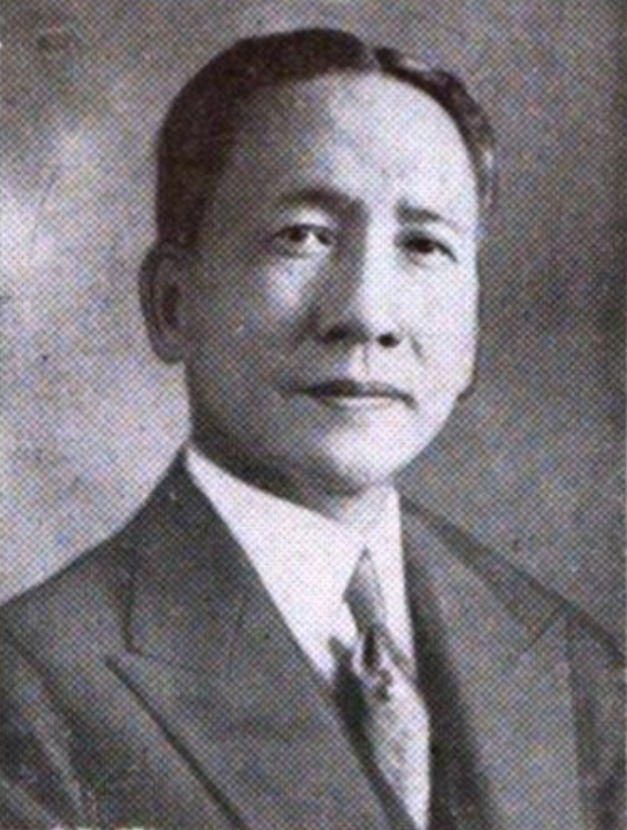
	Majority party	Minority party
Leader	Manuel L. Quezon	Sergio Osmeña
Party	Nacionalista; Democratico	Nacionalista; Pro-Independencia
Leader's seat	5th District	10th District
Seats won	8	3
Seats after	16	8
- Election results; each district sent in two seats to the Senate. 2 Democraticos 2 Pro-Independencias 1 Democratico and 1 Pro-Independencia
Senate President before election
Manuel L. Quezon
Nacionalista Consolidato
Elected Senate President
Manuel L. Quezon
Nacionalista Consolidato

Legislative elections were held on June 5, 1934 in the Philippines. Manuel L. Quezon and Sergio Osmeña were re-elected in the Philippine Senate and still arch-rivals since the Nacionalista Party broke up in 1922.

== Electoral system ==
In a staggered election, the seats of the senators who were first disputed in 1922 were up for election. The Philippines is divided into 12 senatorial districts, of which all districts save for the 12th district, has one of its seats up. In the 12th district, any vacancy is filled via appointment of the Governor-General. The election itself is via first-past-the-post.

== Results ==
↓

16	8
Democratico	Pro-Independencia

=== Philippines's 1st senatorial district ===
Candidate	Party	Votes	%
Melecio Arranz	Partido Nacionalista Democratico	42,157	44.08
Santiago Fonacier	Partido Democrata Nacional	34,710	36.29
Vicente T. Fernandez	Partido Democrata Nacional	18,774	19.63
Total		95,641	100.00

=== Philippines's 2nd senatorial district ===
Candidate	Party	Votes	%
Teofilo Sison	Partido Nacionalista Democratico	57,443	51.91
Camilo Osias	Partido Democrata Nacional	53,215	48.09
Total		110,658	100.00

=== Philippines's 3rd senatorial district ===
Candidate	Party	Votes	%
Hermogenes Concepcion	Partido Democrata Nacional	76,882	58.75
Ricardo Lloret	Partido Nacionalista Democratico	53,987	41.25
Total		130,869	100.00

=== Philippines's 4th senatorial district ===
Candidate	Party	Votes	%
Juan Sumulong	Partido Nacionalista Democratico	52,005	51.65
Rafael Palma	Partido Democrata Nacional	43,124	42.83
Celerino Tiongco	Partido Ganap de Filipinas	3,004	2.98
Crisanto Evangelista	Partido Komunista ng Pilipinas-1930	2,558	2.54
Total		100,691	100.00

=== Philippines's 5th senatorial district ===
Candidate	Party	Votes	%
Manuel L. Quezon	Partido Nacionalista Democratico	71,442	67.45
Sixto Lopez	Partido Democrata Nacional	25,863	24.42
Jose Timog	Partido Ganap de Filipinas	8,621	8.14
Total		105,926	100.00

=== Philippines's 6th senatorial district ===
Candidate	Party	Votes	%
Domingo Imperial	Partido Nacionalista Democratico	57,462	57.68
Pedro Sabido	Partido Democrata Nacional	42,158	42.32
Total		99,620	100.00

=== Philippines's 7th senatorial district ===
Candidate	Party	Votes	%
Potenciano Treñas	Partido Democrata Nacional	45,865	52.11
Jose Hontiveros	Partido Nacionalista Democratico	42,147	47.89
Total		88,012	100.00

=== Philippines's 8th senatorial district ===
Candidate	Party	Votes	%
Isaac Lacson	Partido Nacionalista Democratico	88,776	46.07
Matias Hilado	Partido Democrata Nacional	63,526	32.96
Alfredo M. Konahap-Villegas	Partido Nacionalista Pro-Independencia	24,981	12.96
Joaquin Quisumbing	Partido Obrerista	15,428	8.01
Total		192,711	100.00

=== Philippines's 9th senatorial district ===
Candidate	Party	Votes	%
Jose Avelino	Partido Nacionalista Democratico	46,810	54.73
Pastor Salazar	Partido Democrata Nacional	38,726	45.27
Total		85,536	100.00

=== Philippines's 10th senatorial district ===
Candidate	Party	Votes	%
Sergio Osmeña	Partido Nacionalista Pro-Independencia	42,389	52.51
Vicente Sotto	Independent	31,976	39.61
Hilario Moncado	Partido Modernista	5,814	7.20
Total		80,179	100.00
Total votes		80,719	–

=== Philippines's 11th senatorial district ===
Candidate	Party	Votes	%
Jose Clarin	Partido Nacionalista Democratico	32,551	41.24
Candelario Borja	Partido Democrata Nacional	26,953	34.15
Jose Artadi	Northern Mindanao League	19,425	24.61
Total		78,929	100.00

=== Philippines's 12th senatorial district* ===
Candidate	Party
Datu Sinsuat Balabaran	Partido Democrata Nacional
Juan Gaerlan	Partido Nacionalista Democratico
Total

- Non-elective positions. Appointed by the American Governor-General

Party	Seats				
Party	Up	Before	Won	After	+/−
Nacionalista (Note: The Nacionalista Party won 11 seats: 8 seats under the Democratico faction and 3 seats under the Democrata Pro-Independencia faction. Following the election, the Nacionalista Party has a total of 24 seats: 16 seats under the Democratico faction and 8 seats under the Democrata Pro-Independencia faction.)	10	21	11	22	+1
Democrata	1	1	0	0	−1
Appointed (Note: Of the two appointed senators from Nacionalista, one was from the Democratico faction and one was from the Democrata Pro-Independencia faction.)	0	2	0	2	0
Total	11	24	11	24	1

== Aftermath ==
This was the last Senate election before 1946, since the Constitutional Convention, elected a month later, abolished the Senate by creating the unicameral National Assembly. The Senate would have been restored with amendments to the constitution that would have been applied in 1941, but World War II broke out and the elected senators would not have served until 1946.

== See also ==
- 10th Philippine Legislature
- Commission on Elections
- Politics of the Philippines
- Philippine elections
