= Modernist Party =

Modernist Party may refer to

- New Party, also referred to as the "Modernist Party", Greek political party established in 1873
- Modernist Party, Philippine political party associated with Hilario Moncado
