= 1946 Philippine legislative election =

Elections to the Congress of the Philippines was held on April 23, 1946. Voters elected the members of Congress in the following elections:

- 1946 Philippine Senate election for all 24 members of the Senate of the Philippines and
- 1946 Philippine House of Representatives elections for all of the members of the House of Representatives of the Philippines.
