= 1946 Philippine Senate election =

9th Philippine senatorial election

- April 23, 1946

16 (of the 24) seats in the Senate 13 seats needed for a majority
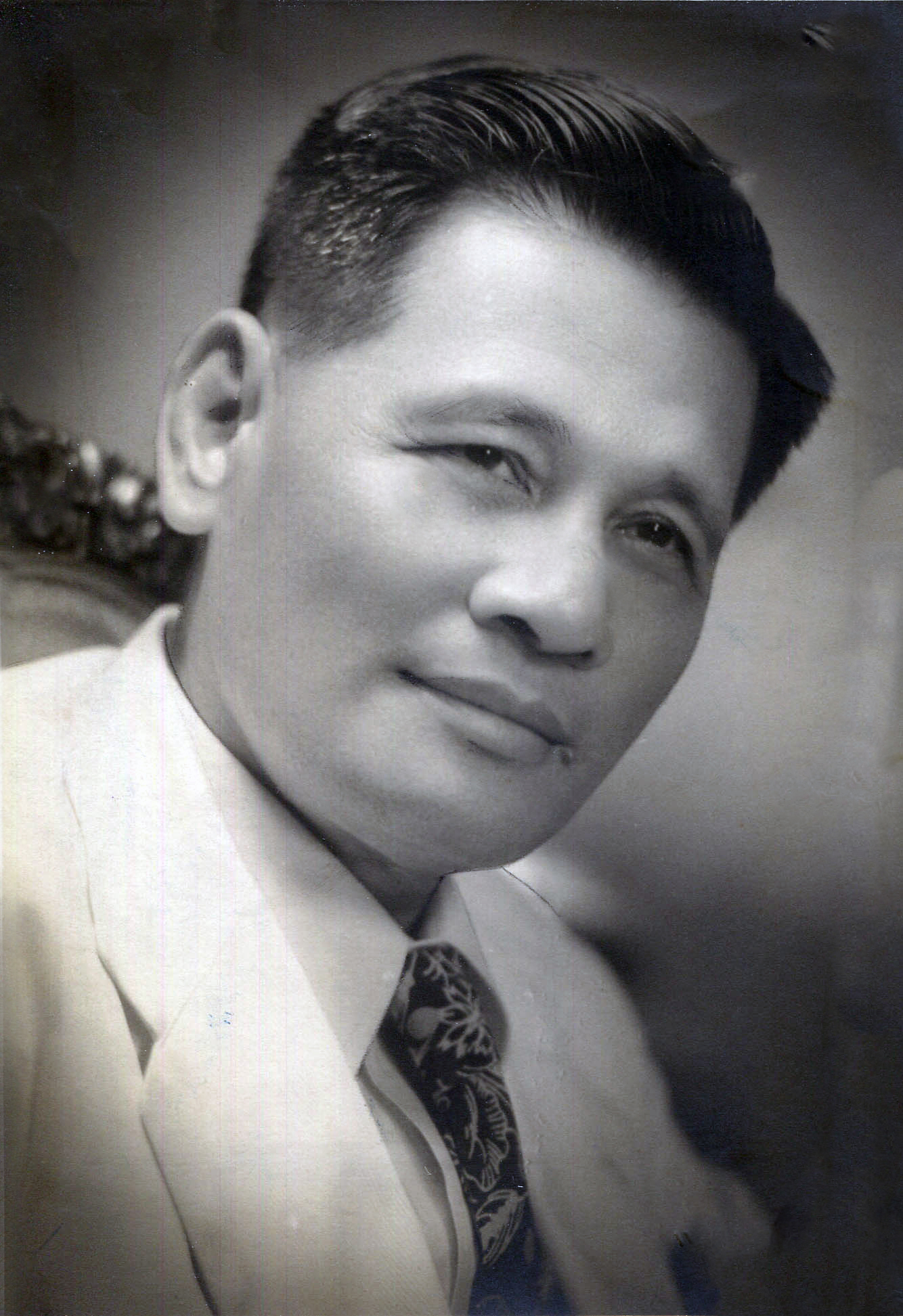

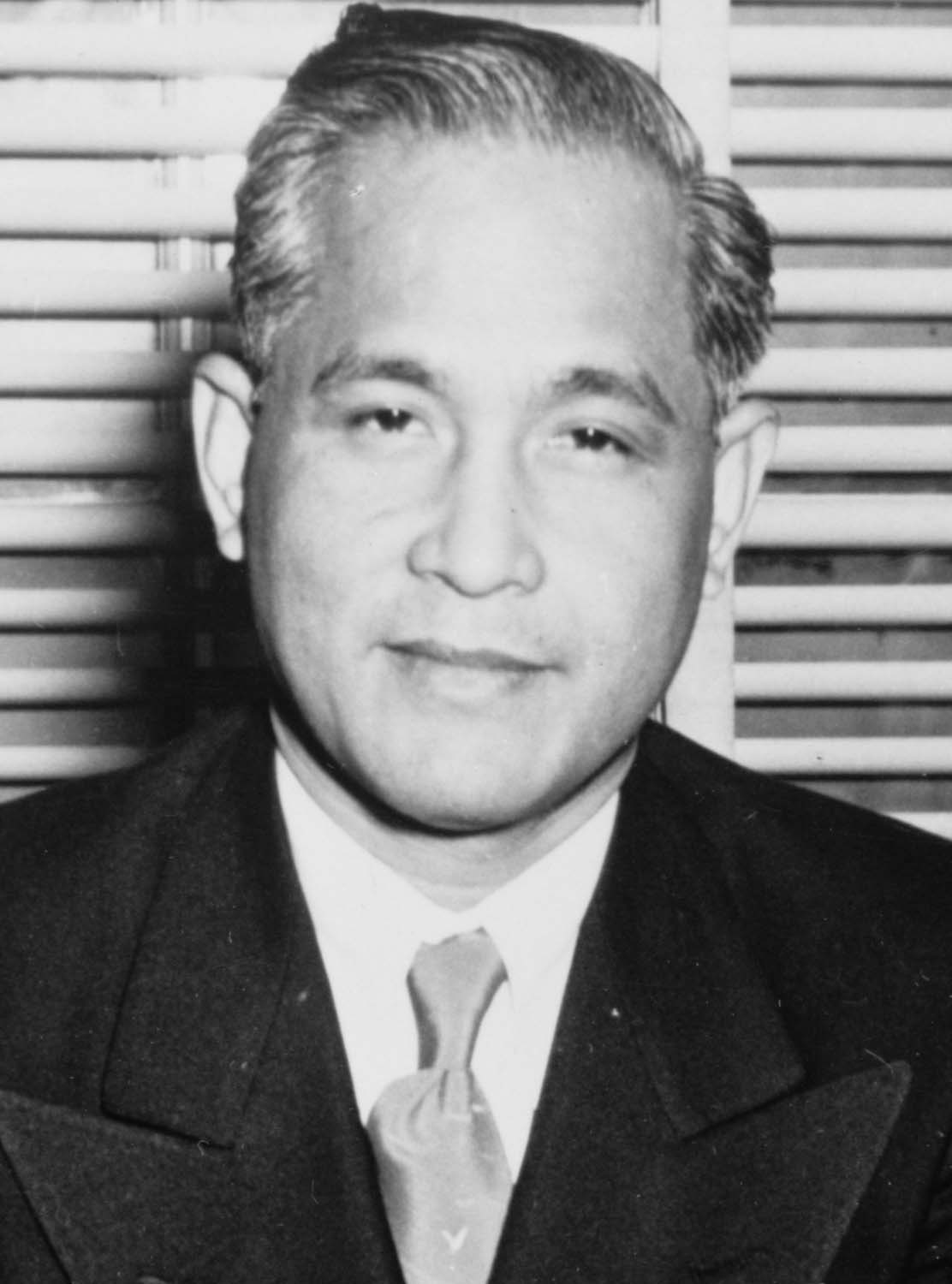

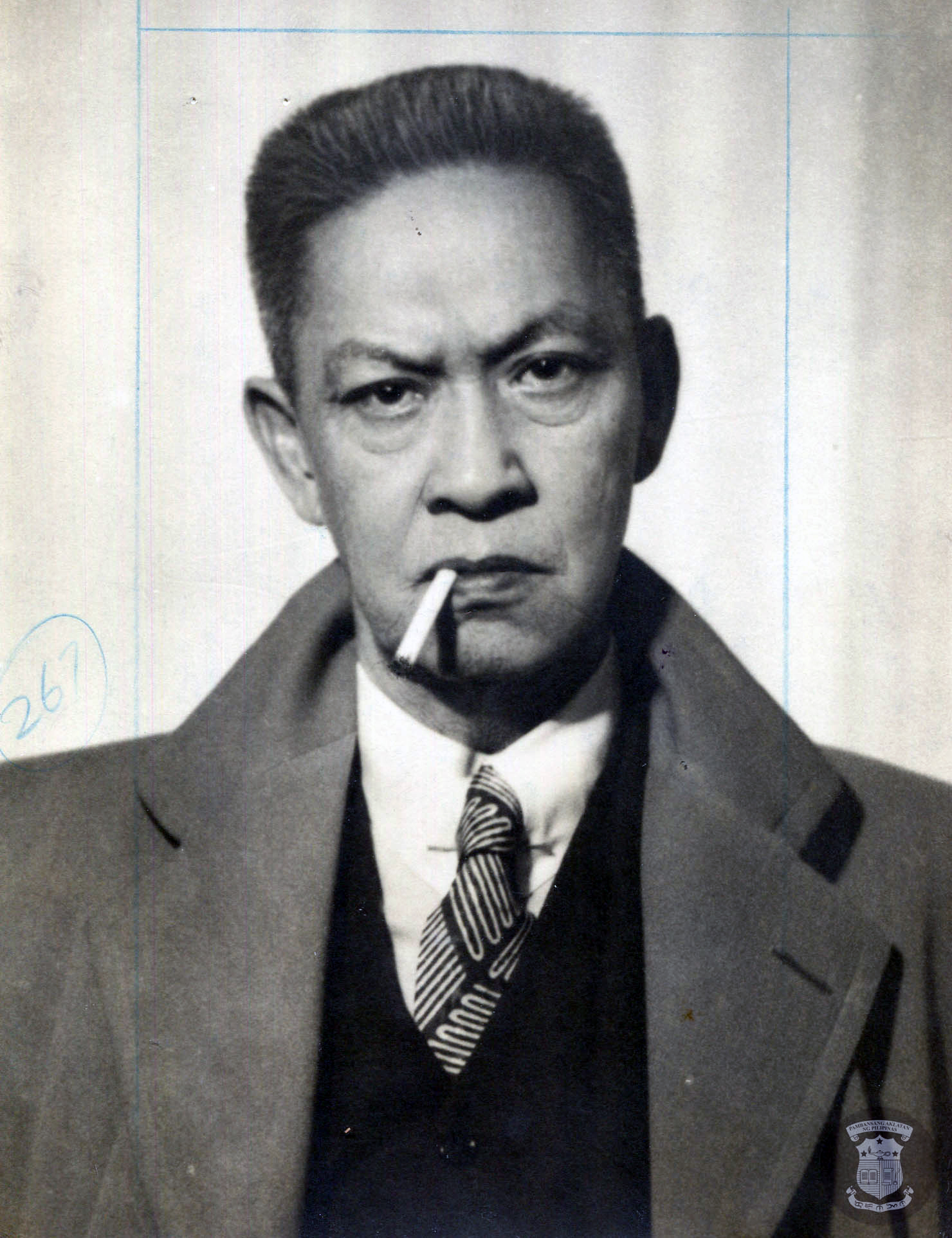
	Majority party	Minority party	Third party
Leader	José Avelino	Carlos P. Garcia	Vicente Sotto
Party	Liberal	Nacionalista	Popular Front
Seats before	3 (1 up)	20 (9 up)	0
Seats won	9	6	1
Seats after	10	13	1
Seat change	▲6	▼3	▲1
Popular vote	8,626,965	7,454,074	1,199,138
Percentage	47.26	40.81	6.56
Senate President before election
Manuel Roxas
Liberal
Elected Senate President
José Avelino
Liberal

The 9th election of members to the Senate of the Philippines was held on April 23, 1946, pursuant to Commonwealth Act No. 725.

== Electoral system ==
Philippine Senate elections are held via plurality block voting with staggered elections, with the country as an at-large district. There are 24 seats in the Senate, with eight seats up every election for every two years starting from the first election in 1941; of the results in that election, the first eight would have served for six years, the next eight for four years, and the last eight for two years. Due to the intervention of World War II and the destruction of records, this election was the next election since 1941, and that lots were drawn on the 16 seats that would have been up in this election.

On this election, each voter has sixteen votes, of which one can vote up to sixteen names. Sixteen candidates shall then be elected, of which the first eight candidates with the most votes serving until 1951, then the next eight serving until 1949.

== Background ==
Soon after the reconstitution of the Commonwealth Government in 1945 Senators Manuel Roxas, Elpidio Quirino and their allies called for an early national election to choose the president and vice president of the Philippines and members of the Congress. In December 1945, the United States House Committee on Insular Affairs of the United States Congress approved the joint resolution setting the election date at not later than April 30, 1946.

Prompted by this congressional action, President Sergio Osmeña called the Philippine Congress to a three-day special session. Congress enacted Commonwealth Act No. 725, setting the election on April 23, 1946, and was approved by President Osmeña on January 5, 1946.

== Retiring incumbents ==
The following are retiring in this election:

1. Antonio de las Alas (Nacionalista)
2. Nicolas Buendia (Nacionalista)
3. Ramon J. Fernandez (Nacionalista)
4. Domingo Imperial (Nacionalista)
5. Quintin Paredes (Nacionalista–Liberal wing)
  - Ran for representative from Abra and won
6. Elpidio Quirino (Nacionalista–Liberal wing)
  - Ran for vice president of the Philippines and won
7. Manuel Roxas (Nacionalista–Liberal wing)
  - Ran for president of the Philippines and won
8. José Yulo (Nacionalista)

=== Mid-term vacancies ===
1. Daniel Maramba (Nacionalista), died on December 28, 1941
2. José Ozámiz (Nacionalista), executed on February 11, 1944

=== Senators running elsewhere ===
1. Eulogio Rodriguez (Nacionalista) ran for vice president of the Philippines and lost

== Candidates ==
Total seats up: 16
Party	Total
Nacionalista	16
Liberal	16
Modernist	15
National Welfare Service Party	3
Popular Front	2
Democratic (Osmeña)	1
Democratic Alliance	1
Laborite Party	1
Nacionalista (ind.)	1
Total	56

Major parties
Nacionalista Party (NP)	Nacionalista Party (Liberal wing) (NP L)	Modernist Party (MP)
Jose Altavas	Melecio Arranz	Miguel Anzures
Antonio Araneta	José Avelino	Godofredo Calub
Pascual Azanza	Olegario Clarin	Constancio P. Cecilio
Tomas Cabili	Eduardo Cojuangco Sr.	Jose Climaco
Tomás Confesor	Mariano Jesús Cuenco	Emilia T. Del Rosario
Timoteo Consing	Servillano dela Cruz	Jesus Infante
Ramón Diokno	Vicente dela Cruz	Marcelino Josue
Carlos P. Garcia	Vicente Francisco	Vicente Ocampo
Dionesio Gutierrez	Mariano Garchitorena	Carlos Padilla Sr.
Pedro Insua	Vicente Lava	Felix E. Rey
Alejo Mabanag	Pasto Lavadia	Casiano Rosales
Rafael Martinez	Enrique Magalona	Dominador Santiago
Pedro S. Reyes	Pedro Magsalin	Manuel Silos
José E. Romero	Salipada Pendatun	Jose C. Soto
Asa-ad Usman	Prospero Sanidad	Carlos V. Tolosa
José O. Vera	Ramon Torres	—N/a

Minor parties
Democratic (Osmeña)	Democratic Alliance (DA)	Laborite Party	Nacionalista Party (independent)	National Welfare Service Party	Popular Front (PF)
Rosendo Zaldarriaga	Ramon Lopez	Antonio Paguia	Francisco Zandueta	Ismael Golez	Emilio M. Javier
—N/a	—N/a	—N/a	—N/a	Melchor Lagasca	Vicente Sotto
—N/a	—N/a	—N/a	—N/a	Paul Versoza	—N/a

== Results ==
The election was generally peaceful and orderly except in some places where passions ran high, especially in the province of Pampanga. According to the controversial decision of the Electoral Tribunal of the House of Representatives on Meliton Soliman vs. Luis Taruc, Pampanga "was under the terroristic clutches and control of the Hukbalahaps. So terrorized were the people of Arayat, at one time, 200 persons abandoned their homes, their work, and their food, all their belongings in a mass evacuation to the poblacion due to fear and terror."

The dominant Nacionalista Party was divided into two wings in this election. The Liberal wing was led by Senate President Manuel Roxas, while the original Nacionalista Party was headed by President Sergio Osmeña. Roxas defeated Osmeña in the concurrent presidential election, while Roxas's running mate Senator Elpidio Quirino defeated Osmeña's running mate Senator Eulogio Rodriguez.

In the Senate elections, the Liberal wing won nine seats, the original Nacionalista Party won six seats, and the Popular Front won one.

These senators from Liberal wing defended their seats: Melecio Arranz, Mariano Jesus Cuenco, and Ramon Torres. Carlos P. Garcia was the sole senator from the original Nacionalista Party to defend his seat.

Newcomer senators include the Liberal wing's topnotcher Vicente Francisco, Jose Avelino, Olegario Clarin, Enrique Magalona, and Salipada Pendatun. Neophytes from the original Nacionalista Party are Tomas Confesor, Alejo Mabanag, Tomas Cabili, and Ramon Diokno. Newcomer Vicente Sotto was the sole candidate of the Popular Front elected.

José E. Romero of the Nacionalista was also a neophyte senator, but was unseated by the Prospero Sanidad of the Liberals, also a neophyte.

José O. Vera of the original Nacionalista Party, who last served in the Senate when it was abolished in 1935, is the sole senator to make a comeback.

The Liberal Party won nine out of 16 contested senatorial seats; the first eight senators would serve until 1951, and the second eight until 1949:

	1	2	3	4	5	6	7	8	9	10	11	12	13	14	15	16	17	18	19	20	21	22	23	24
Before election		‡	‡	‡	‡	‡	‡	‡^	‡^	‡	‡	‡	‡	‡	‡	‡	‡							
Election result	Not up	LP									PF	NP						Not up						
After election		√	√	*	*	*	*	+	+	+	+	*	*	*	*	√	√							

Key:

- ‡ Seats up
- ^ Vacancy
- + Gained by a party from another party
- √ Held by the incumbent
- * Held by the same party with a new senator

Candidate	Party	Votes	%
Vicente Francisco	Nacionalista Party (Liberal Wing)	735,671	28.63
Vicente Sotto	Popular Front	717,225	27.91
Jose Avelino	Nacionalista Party (Liberal Wing)	708,420	27.57
Melecio Arranz	Nacionalista Party (Liberal Wing)	666,700	25.94
Ramon Torres	Nacionalista Party (Liberal Wing)	640,477	24.92
Tomas Confesor	Nacionalista Party	627,354	24.41
Mariano Jesus Cuenco	Nacionalista Party (Liberal Wing)	623,650	24.27
Carlos P. Garcia	Nacionalista Party	617,542	24.03
Olegario Clarin	Nacionalista Party (Liberal Wing)	611,227	23.78
Alejo Mabanag	Nacionalista Party	608,902	23.69
Enrique Magalona	Nacionalista Party (Liberal Wing)	591,796	23.03
Tomas Cabili	Nacionalista Party	589,762	22.95
Jose O. Vera	Nacionalista Party	588,993	22.92
Ramon Diokno	Nacionalista Party	584,593	22.75
Jose E. Romero	Nacionalista Party	563,816	21.94
Salipada Pendatun	Nacionalista Party (Liberal Wing)	557,156	21.68
Prospero Sanidad	Nacionalista Party (Liberal Wing)	556,772	21.67
Vicente dela Cruz	Nacionalista Party (Liberal Wing)	544,621	21.19
Servillano dela Cruz	Nacionalista Party (Liberal Wing)	536,995	20.90
Pedro Magsalin	Nacionalista Party (Liberal Wing)	516,127	20.08
Antonio Paguia	Laborite Party	505,770	19.68
Santiago Fonacier	Nacionalista Party	499,565	19.44
Antonio Araneta	Nacionalista Party	491,054	19.11
Emilio M.Javier	Popular Front	481,913	18.75
Eduardo Cojuangco Sr.	Nacionalista Party (Liberal Wing)	481,683	18.74
Pedro S. Reyes	Nacionalista Party	465,987	18.13
Jose Altavas	Nacionalista Party	461,014	17.94
Rafael Martinez	Nacionalista Party	449,534	17.49
Vicente Lava	Nacionalista Party (Liberal Wing)	431,842	16.80
Mariano Garchitorena	Nacionalista Party (Liberal Wing)	423,828	16.49
Pedro Insua	Nacionalista Party	403,561	15.70
Pascual Azanza	Nacionalista Party	397,835	15.48
Carlos Padilla Sr.	Modernist Party	75,066	2.92
Dionesio Gutierrez	Nacionalista Party	49,037	1.91
Francisco Zandueta	Nacionalista Party (Independent)	47,802	1.86
Ramon Lopez	Democratic Alliance	44,718	1.74
Vicente Ocampo	Modernist Party	43,872	1.71
Jose C. Soto	Modernist Party	35,408	1.38
Asa-ad Usman	Nacionalista Party	28,924	1.13
Timoteo Y. Consing	Nacionalista Party	27,597	1.07
Emilia T. del Rosario	Modernist Party	25,586	1.00
Manuel Silos	Modernist Party	23,344	0.91
Miguel Anzures	Modernist Party	20,441	0.80
Jose Climaco	Modernist Party	20,231	0.79
Ismael Golez	National Welfare Service Party	17,069	0.66
Dominador Santiago	Modernist Party	16,553	0.64
Casiano Rosales	Modernist Party	14,949	0.58
Carlos V. Tolosa	Modernist Party	13,527	0.53
Paul Versoza	National Welfare Service Party	12,094	0.47
Godofredo Calub	Modernist Party	11,498	0.45
Jesus Infante	Modernist Party	10,487	0.41
Melchor D. Lagasca	National Welfare Service Party	10,323	0.40
Felix E. Rey	Modernist Party	9,787	0.38
Rosendo Zaldarriaga	Democratic Party	9,656	0.38
Pasto Lavadia	Nacionalista Party (Liberal Wing)	7,864	0.31
Constancio P. Cecilio	Modernist Party	7,807	0.30
Marcelino Josue	Modernist Party	4,604	0.18
Total		18,269,629	100.00
Total votes		2,569,880	–

=== Per party ===
The Nacionalistas originally won 7 seats. but an election protest unseated a Nacionalista senator in favor of a Liberal one in 1946.

Party	Votes	%	Seats				
Party	Votes	%	Up	Before	Won	After	+/−
Nacionalista Party (Liberal wing)	8,634,829	47.26	6	7	9	10	+3
Nacionalista Party	7,455,075	40.81	8	15	6	13	−2
Popular Front	1,199,138	6.56	0	0	1	1	New
Laborite Party	505,770	2.77	0	0	0	0	0
Modernist Party	333,160	1.82	0	0	0	0	0
Nacionalista Party (independent)	47,802	0.26	0	0	0	0	0
Democratic Alliance	44,718	0.24	0	0	0	0	0
National Welfare Service Party	39,486	0.22	0	0	0	0	0
Democratic (Osmeña)	9,656	0.05	0	0	0	0	0
Vacancy			2	2	0	0	−2
Total	18,269,634	100.00	16	24	16	24	0
Total votes	2,569,880	–					
Registered voters/turnout	2,898,604	88.66					

Vote share
LP	47.26%
NP	40.81%
PF	6.56%
Others	5.37%

Senate seats
LP	56.25%
NP	37.50%
PF	6.25%
Others	0.00%

== Defeated incumbents ==
- Rafael Martinez (Nacionalista)

== See also ==
- Commission on Elections
- 2nd Congress of the Commonwealth of the Philippines
