= 1946 Philippine presidential election =

3rd election of Philippine president

- April 23, 1946
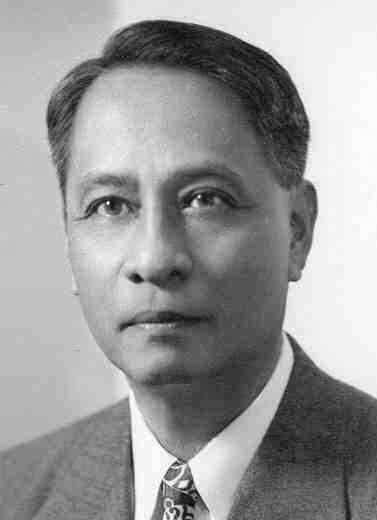

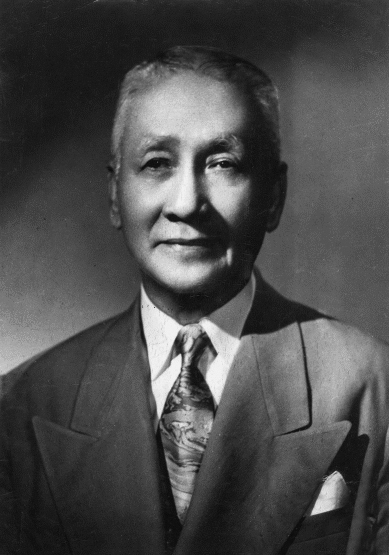
Nominee	Manuel Roxas	Sergio Osmeña
Party	Liberal	Nacionalista
Running mate	Elpidio Quirino	Eulogio Rodriguez
Popular vote	1,333,392	1,129,996
Percentage	53.94%	45.71%
President before election
Sergio Osmeña
Nacionalista
Elected President
Manuel Roxas
Liberal
- 1946 Philippine vice presidential election
- April 23, 1946
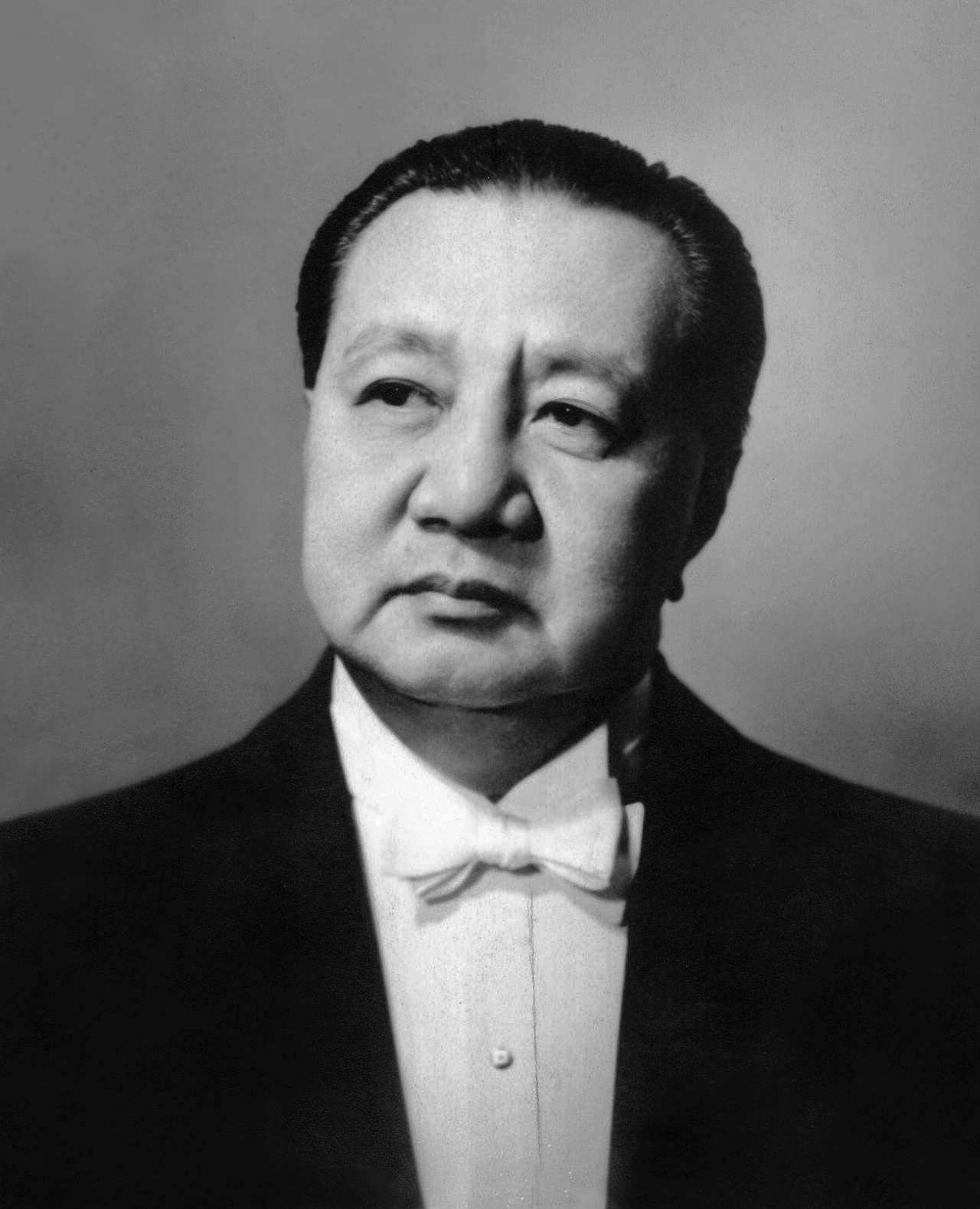

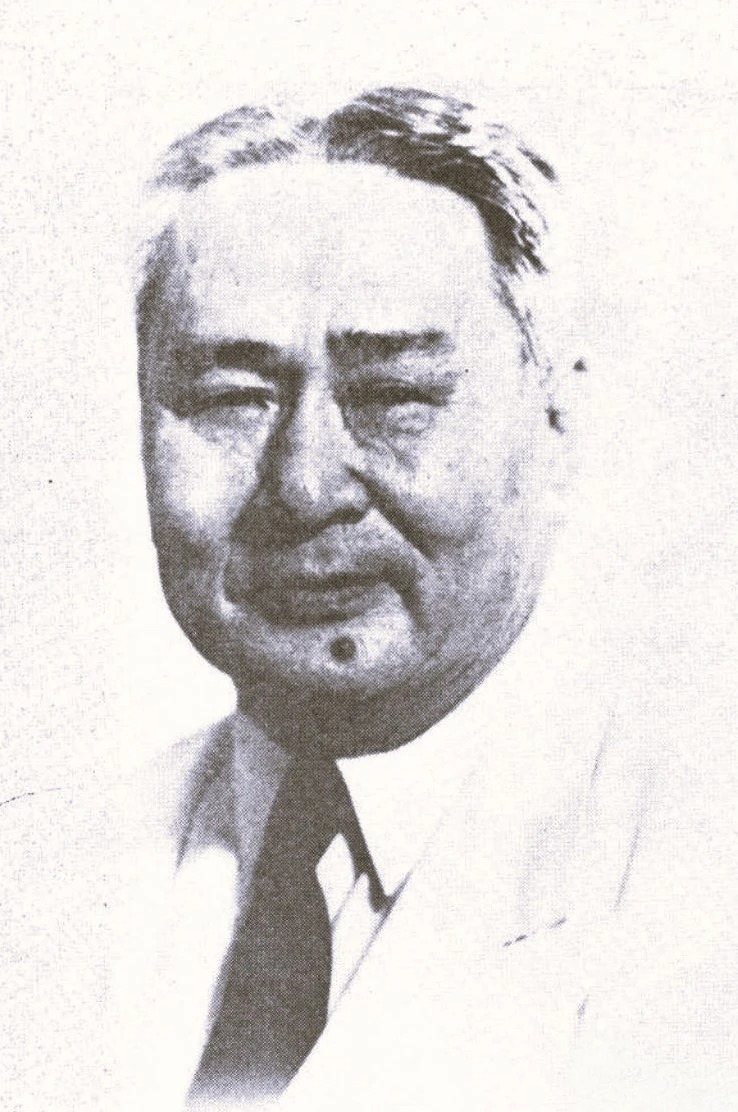
Candidate	Elpidio Quirino	Eulogio Rodriguez
Party	Liberal	Nacionalista
Popular vote	1,161,725	1,051,243
Percentage	52.36%	47.38%
Vice President before election
Vacant (Sergio Osmeña in previous election)
Elected Vice President
Elpidio Quirino
Liberal

Presidential and vice presidential elections were held in the Philippines on April 23, 1946, according to Commonwealth Act No. 725. Incumbent president Sergio Osmeña ran for a full term but was defeated by Senator Manuel Roxas. Meanwhile, Senator Elpidio Quirino defeated fellow Senator Eulogio Rodriguez to become vice president.

== Background ==
Due to the Commonwealth of the Philippines government being driven into exile by World War II, the supposed midterm election in November 1943 and the general election in November 1945 were not held as scheduled. Soon after the reconstitution of the Commonwealth government in 1945, Senators Manuel Roxas, Elpidio Quirino, and their allies called for an early national election to choose the president and vice president of the Philippines, as well as the members of Congress. In December 1945, the House Insular Affairs Committee of the United States Congress approved the joint resolution, setting the election date by April 30, 1946.

Prompted by this congressional action, President Sergio Osmeña called the Philippine Congress to a three-day special session. Congress enacted Commonwealth Act No. 725, setting the election date on April 23, 1946. President Osmeña signed the act on January 5, 1946.

== Candidates ==
Three parties presented their respective candidates for the different national elective positions. These were the Nacionalista Party, the Conservative (Osmeña) Wing, the Liberal Wing of the Nacionalista Party, and the Partido Modernista. The Nacionalistas had Osmeña and Senator Eulogio Rodriguez as their candidates for president and vice president, respectively. The Modernistas chose Hilario Camino Moncado and Luis Salvador for the same positions. On the other hand, the standard bearers of the Liberals were senators Manuel Roxas and Elpidio Quirino.

On January 3, 1946, President Osmeña announced his candidacy for president. On January 22, 1946, Eulogio Rodriguez was nominated as Osmeña's running mate for vice president in a convention held at Ciro's Club in Manila. According to the Manila Chronicle:

The convention opened at 10:15 in the morning when the acting secretary of the party, Vicente Farmoso, called the confab to order.

Congressman Jose C. Romero, who delivered the keynote speech, accused Senate President Manuel Roxas and his followers of fanning the flames of discontent among the people, capitalizing on the people's hardship, and minimizing the accomplishment of the [Osmeña] Administration. These men with the Messiah complex have been the country's and world's bane. This is the mentality that produces Hitlers and Mussolinis, and in their desire to climb to power, they even want to destroy the party which placed them where they are today.

Senator Carlos P. Garcia, who delivered the nomination speech for President Sergio Osmeña, recited Osmeña's achievements and virtues as a public official and private citizen.

Entering the convention hall at about 7:30 p.m., President Osmeña, accompanied by the committee on notification, was greeted with cheer and applause as he ascended the platform. President Osmeña delivered his speech, a general outline of his plans once elected. He emphasized that as far as his party is concerned, independence is a close issue. It was coming on July 4, 1946.

On January 19, 1946, Senator Roxas announced his candidacy for president in a convention held in Santa Ana Cabaret in Makati, Rizal. According to the Manila Chronicle:

...more than three thousand (by conservative estimates, there were only 1,000 plus) delegates, party members, and hero worshipers jammed into suburban, well-known Santa Ana Cabaret (biggest in the world) to acclaim ex-katipunero and Bagong Katipunan organizer Manuel Acuña Roxas as the guidon bearer of the Nacionalista Party's Liberal Wing.

The delegates from all over the Islands met in a formal convention from 10:50 a.m. and broke up at about 5:30 p.m.

They elected 1. Mariano J. Cuenco, professional Osmeñaphobe, as temporary chairman; 2. Jose Avelino and ex-pharmacist Antonio Zacarias, permanent chairman and secretary, respectively; 3. nominated forty-four candidates for senators; 4. heard the generalissimo himself deliver an oratorical masterpiece consisting of 50 per cent attacks against the (Osmeña) Administration, 50 per cent promises, pledges. Rabid Roxasites greeted the Roxas acceptance speech with hysterical applause.

President Osmeña tried to prevent the split in the Nacionalista Party by offering Senator Roxas the position of Philippine Regent Commissioner to the United States, but the latter turned down the offer.

As a result of the split among the members of the Nacionalista Party, owing to marked differences of opinion on specific vital issues of which no settlement had been reached, a new political organization was born and named the Liberal Wing of the Nacionalista Party, which would later become the Liberal Party.

== Results ==
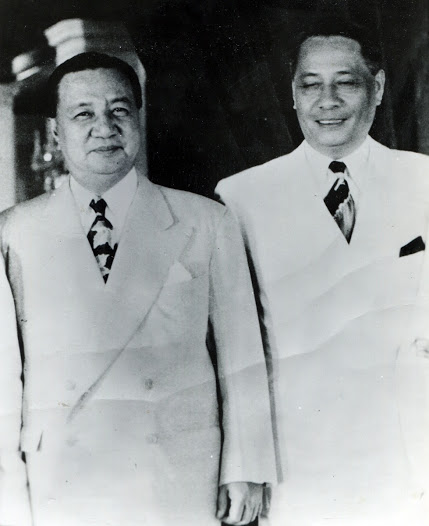
Manuel Roxas (right) and Elpidio Quirino (left)

The election was generally peaceful and orderly except in some places where passions ran high, especially in Pampanga. According to the "controversial" decision of the Electoral Tribunal of the House of Representatives on Meliton Soliman vs. Luis Taruc, Pampanga "was under the terroristic clutches and control of the Hukbalahaps. So terrorized were the people of Arayat were terrorized; at one time, 200 persons abandoned their homes, work, food, and belongings in a mass evacuation to the Poblacion due to fear and terror."

A total of 2,596,880 voters went to the polls to elect their president and vice president, who was to be the Commonwealth's last and the Republic's first. President Osmena chose not to actively campaign, saying the Filipinos knew his record of 40 years of loyal service to the country.

Four days after election day, the Liberal candidates were proclaimed victors. Roxas registered a majority of votes in 34 provinces and nine cities: Abra, Agusan, Albay, Antique, Bataan, Batanes, Batangas, Bukidnon, Bulacan, Cagayan, Camarines Norte, Camarines Sur, Capiz, Cavite, Cotabato, Ilocos Norte, Ilocos Sur, Isabela, Laguna, La Union, Leyte, Marinduque, Mindoro, Misamis Oriental, Negros Occidental, Nueva Vizcaya, Palawan, Pangasinan, Rizal, Romblon, Samar, Sorsogon, Sulu, Surigao, Tayabas, Zambales, Manila, Quezon City, Bacolod (Negros Occidental), Iloilo City (Iloilo), Baguio (Mountain Province), Zamboanga City (Zamboanga), Tagaytay (Cavite), Cavite City (Cavite) and San Pablo City (Laguna).

Likewise, the Liberal Party won nine out of 16 contested senatorial seats.

In the House of Representatives, the Liberals achieved a majority with 50 seats won, while the Nacionalistas and the Democratic Alliance were only victorious in 33 and six seats, respectively.

=== President ===
==== Summary ====
Candidate	Party	Votes	%
Manuel Roxas	Nacionalista Party (Liberal wing) (Note: The Nacionalista Party was split into two wings: those who supported Osmeña or the "conservative wing", and those who supported Roxas or the "liberal wing". The liberal wing eventually split off after the election and became the Liberal Party.)	1,333,006	53.93
Sergio Osmeña	Nacionalista Party	1,129,994	45.72
Hilario Moncado	Modernist Party	8,538	0.35
Total		2,471,538	100.00
Valid votes		2,471,538	95.17
Invalid/blank votes		125,342	4.83
Total votes		2,596,880	100.00
Registered voters/turnout		2,898,604	89.59
Source: Nohlen, Grotz, Hartmann, Hasall and Santos

Popular vote
Roxas	53.93%
Osmeña	45.72%
Moncado	0.35%

==== By province/city ====
Province/City	Roxas		Osmeña		Moncado	
Province/City	Votes	%	Votes	%	Votes	%
Abra	6,760	63.83	3,813	36.00	18	0.17
Agusan	9,354	50.29	9,219	49.57	26	0.14
Albay	25,940	51.57	24,344	48.40	13	0.03
Antique	18,271	58.48	12,952	41.46	19	0.06
Bataan	9,468	53.25	8,309	46.73	4	0.02
Batanes	1,326	64.65	705	34.37	20	0.98
Batangas	56,410	70.02	24,118	29.94	37	0.05
Bohol	30,592	42.98	40,285	56.59	308	0.43
Bukidnon	3,011	53.65	2,451	43.67	150	2.67
Bulacan	39,799	50.77	38,549	49.18	38	0.05
Cagayan	15,514	37.40	25,605	61.72	365	0.88
Camarines Norte	10,471	65.62	5,482	34.35	4	0.03
Camarines Sur	33,267	57.85	24,214	42.11	21	0.04
Capiz	41,844	69.72	18,161	30.26	14	0.02
Catanduanes	5,477	38.63	8,698	61.34	4	0.03
Cavite	38,111	77.26	11,196	22.70	19	0.04
Cebu	53,848	35.12	98,700	64.37	792	0.52
Cotabato	17,826	51.85	16,490	47.96	66	0.19
Culion Leper Colony	47	10.06	420	89.94	0	0.00
Davao	11,896	36.43	19,226	58.87	1,536	4.70
Ilocos Norte	25,464	67.36	12,097	32.00	243	0.64
Ilocos Sur	30,322	64.67	16,530	35.26	34	0.07
Iloilo	79,136	64.50	43,522	35.48	25	0.02
Isabela	17,431	64.35	9,220	34.04	437	1.61
La Union	22,499	60.00	14,845	39.59	157	0.42
Laguna	36,527	62.12	22,246	37.83	26	0.04
Lanao	17,212	31.12	37,101	67.09	991	1.79
Leyte	64,236	56.17	49,965	43.69	155	0.14
Manila	82,457	72.24	31,513	27.61	172	0.15
Marinduque	10,596	80.94	2,487	19.00	8	0.06
Masbate	9,730	44.30	12,207	55.58	27	0.12
Mindoro	14,025	60.27	9,240	39.71	6	0.03
Misamis Occidental	11,165	39.96	15,926	57.00	848	3.04
Misamis Oriental	14,307	52.61	12,737	46.83	153	0.56
Mountain Province	8,490	41.77	11,369	55.93	468	2.30
Negros Occidental	62,605	54.14	52,982	45.81	58	0.05
Negros Oriental	13,262	33.98	25,594	65.58	171	0.44
Nueva Ecija	29,478	41.45	41,616	58.51	28	0.04
Nueva Vizcaya	7,458	67.00	3,664	32.92	9	0.08
Palawan	6,317	54.99	5,164	44.95	7	0.06
Pampanga	11,296	13.97	69,505	85.98	42	0.05
Pangasinan	82,081	55.86	64,794	44.10	56	0.04
Rizal	60,103	62.85	35,418	37.04	101	0.11
Romblon	9,200	72.00	3,560	27.86	17	0.13
Samar	37,553	54.88	30,793	45.00	82	0.12
Sorsogon	20,715	54.16	17,528	45.83	6	0.02
Sulu	6,833	42.53	9,228	57.43	6	0.04
Surigao	15,053	53.89	12,795	45.81	85	0.30
Tarlac	16,868	39.14	26,193	60.77	39	0.09
Tayabas	50,224	82.07	10,954	17.90	16	0.03
Zambales	15,811	69.71	6,853	30.22	16	0.07
Zamboanga	15,706	43.98	19,413	54.36	595	1.67
Total	1,333,392	53.94	1,129,996	45.71	8,538	0.35
Source: Bureau of the Census and Statistics

=== Vice-president ===
==== Summary ====
Candidate	Party	Votes	%
Elpidio Quirino	Nacionalista Party (Liberal wing) (Note: The Nacionalista Party was split into two wings: those who supported Osmeña or the "conservative wing", and those who supported Roxas or the "liberal wing". The liberal wing eventually split off after the election and became the Liberal Party.)	1,161,725	52.36
Eulogio Rodriguez	Nacionalista Party	1,051,243	47.38
Lou Salvador	Modernist Party	5,879	0.26
Total		2,218,847	100.00
Valid votes		2,218,847	85.44
Invalid/blank votes		378,033	14.56
Total votes		2,596,880	100.00
Registered voters/turnout		2,898,604	89.59
Source: Nohlen, Grotz, Hartmann, Hasall and Santos

Popular vote
Quirino	52.36%
Rodriguez	47.38%
Salvador	0.26%

==== By province/city ====
Province/City	Quirino		Rodriguez		Salvador	
Province/City	Votes	%	Votes	%	Votes	%
Abra	6,894	68.99	3,092	30.94	7	0.07
Agusan	8,540	51.19	8,131	48.74	11	0.07
Albay	23,445	51.92	21,696	48.05	12	0.03
Antique	16,749	58.10	12,026	41.71	55	0.19
Bataan	6,424	43.74	8,245	56.14	17	0.12
Batanes	1,466	86.59	221	13.05	6	0.35
Batangas	32,185	59.06	22,195	40.73	111	0.20
Bohol	26,290	43.27	34,296	56.45	167	0.27
Bukidnon	2,899	56.44	2,138	41.63	99	1.93
Bulacan	29,277	42.92	38,881	57.00	50	0.07
Cagayan	21,826	55.55	17,226	43.84	238	0.61
Camarines Norte	10,013	67.15	4,894	32.82	4	0.03
Camarines Sur	31,282	57.55	23,052	42.41	24	0.04
Capiz	36,845	67.79	17,494	32.19	11	0.02
Catanduanes	5,164	37.39	8,645	62.59	4	0.03
Cavite	22,688	55.88	17,882	44.05	28	0.07
Cebu	50,495	35.24	92,253	64.39	524	0.37
Cotabato	17,366	59.57	11,718	40.20	68	0.23
Culion Leper Colony	100	23.26	329	76.51	1	0.23
Davao	12,015	39.09	17,629	57.36	1,090	3.55
Ilocos Norte	26,727	73.21	9,672	26.49	109	0.30
Ilocos Sur	36,158	79.24	9,460	20.73	12	0.03
Iloilo	68,520	62.92	40,343	37.04	42	0.04
Isabela	19,800	76.76	5,786	22.43	208	0.81
La Union	29,126	80.70	6,860	19.01	104	0.29
Laguna	17,724	36.69	30,552	63.25	26	0.05
Lanao	12,638	31.58	26,787	66.94	594	1.48
Leyte	55,873	55.99	43,776	43.87	139	0.14
Manila	67,228	60.80	43,197	39.07	139	0.13
Marinduque	6,405	60.35	4,181	39.40	27	0.25
Masbate	8,378	45.35	10,066	54.48	32	0.17
Mindoro	12,370	62.47	7,423	37.49	7	0.04
Misamis Occidental	8,835	36.49	15,046	62.14	334	1.38
Misamis Oriental	12,245	54.30	10,172	45.11	132	0.59
Mountain Province	11,340	62.68	6,530	36.10	221	1.22
Negros Occidental	56,527	54.56	47,011	45.38	63	0.06
Negros Oriental	11,869	33.96	23,000	65.80	83	0.24
Nueva Ecija	27,949	41.91	38,690	58.02	46	0.07
Nueva Vizcaya	7,095	66.92	3,486	32.88	21	0.20
Palawan	6,219	56.97	4,691	42.97	7	0.06
Pampanga	9,291	12.56	64,566	87.28	119	0.16
Pangasinan	84,775	59.86	56,806	40.11	45	0.03
Rizal	35,512	39.26	54,896	60.69	50	0.06
Romblon	7,482	70.81	3,060	28.96	24	0.23
Samar	34,920	57.58	25,586	42.19	140	0.23
Sorsogon	19,455	54.89	15,980	45.08	10	0.03
Sulu	5,953	43.78	7,640	56.18	5	0.04
Surigao	13,800	53.86	11,768	45.93	56	0.22
Tarlac	17,523	43.39	22,813	56.49	50	0.12
Tayabas	39,338	71.09	15,966	28.85	35	0.06
Zambales	15,370	75.58	4,928	24.23	39	0.19
Zamboanga	13,317	41.34	18,462	57.31	433	1.34
Total	1,161,725	52.36	1,051,243	47.38	5,879	0.26
Source: Bureau of the Census and Statistics

== See also ==
- Commission on Elections
- Politics of the Philippines
- Philippine elections
- President of the Philippines
- 1st Congress of the Philippines
