= 1941 Philippine presidential election =

2nd election of the Philippine president

- November 11, 1941
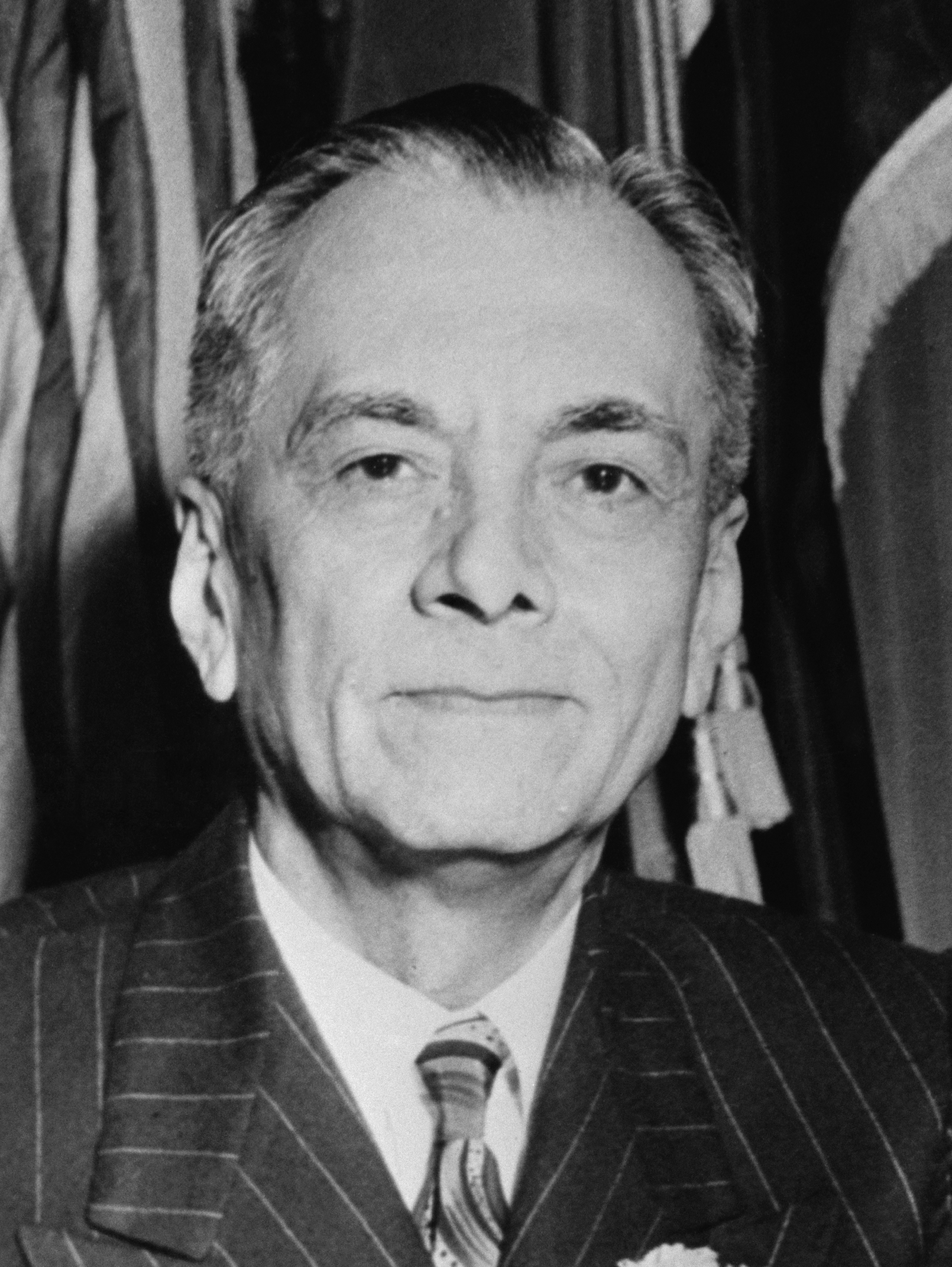

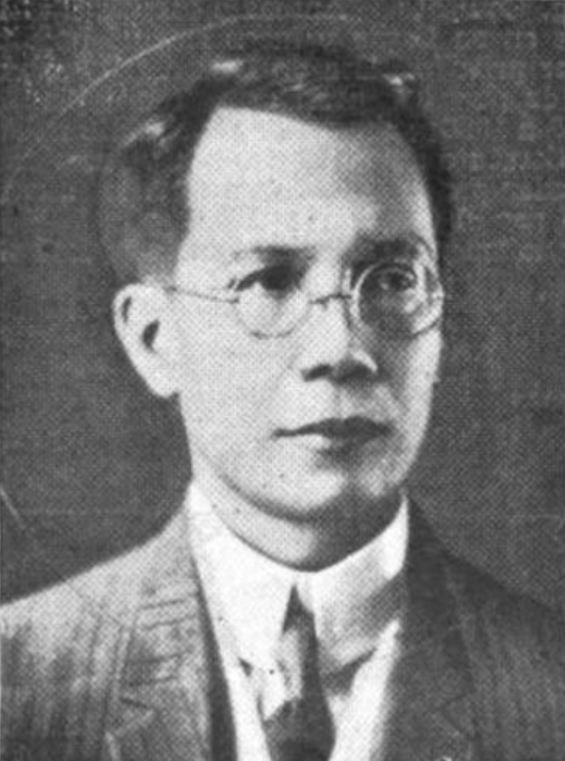
Nominee	Manuel L. Quezon	Juan Sumulong
Party	Nacionalista	Popular Front
Running mate	Sergio Osmeña	Emilio Javier
Popular vote	1,340,320	298,608
Percentage	80.13%	17.85%
President before election
Manuel L. Quezon
Nacionalista
Elected President
Manuel L. Quezon
Nacionalista

Presidential elections were held in the Philippines on November 11, 1941, twenty-seven days before the Attack on Pearl Harbor, which led to the subsequent Japanese invasion of the Philippines. Incumbent President Manuel L. Quezon won a second term as president, defeating his seven challengers, including his closest opponent Juan Sumulong, in a landslide.

Quezon and incumbent Vice President Sergio Osmeña would not complete their respective terms due to the country's entanglement in World War II as well as the former's death in 1944, which would see Osmeña's ascension to the presidency. A Japanese-sponsored republic was established In 1943, which elected Jose P. Laurel as their president, creating a two-year period in which there were two claimants to the presidency.

== Candidates ==
The main contenders in this election were Manuel L. Quezon, the incumbent president of the Commonwealth of the Philippines, under the ruling Nacionalista Party, with incumbent Vice President Sergio Osmeña as his running mate; and Senator Juan Sumulong of the Popular Front-Sumulong Wing (also called Pagkakaisa ng Bayan), with Dr. Emilio M. Javier as his vice presidential candidate. Other presidential-vice presidential tandems include Pedro Abad Santos and Pilar V. Aglipay of the Popular Front-Abad Santos Wing and Republican Party, respectively; Celerino Tiongco I of the Partido Ganap de Filipinas, with Aglipay as his guest running mate; and Hilario C. Moncado of the Partido Modernista and Partido Liberal de Filipinas, with former president Emilio Aguinaldo as his running mate. Abad Santos and Aguinaldo later withdrew their candidacies for president and vice president, respectively. Other candidates include Ernesto Tupas Belleza, Hermogenes Dumpit and Veronica Miciano, independent presidential candidates, and Pedro Yabut, an independent running for vice president.

== Results ==
Quezon and Osmeña performed better than their 1935 poll performance, winning all the provinces. Their feat as a tandem is unmatched to date. The only place that Sumulong won is his hometown, Antipolo in the province of Rizal, where he won by a slim margin over Quezon.

Candidate	Party	Votes	%
Manuel L. Quezon	Nacionalista Party	1,340,320	80.14
Juan Sumulong	Popular Front (Sumulong wing) (Note: The Popular Front was split into two wings: those who supported Pedro Abad Santos or the "Abad Santos wing" and those who supported Juan Sumulong or the "Sumulong wing".)	298,608	17.85
Celerino Tiongco I	Ganap Party	22,474	1.34
Hilario Moncado	Modernist Party	10,726	0.64
Hermogenes Dumpit	Independent	298	0.02
Veronica Miciano	Independent	62	0.00
Ernesto T. Belleza	Independent	16	0.00
Pedro Abad Santos (Note: Withdrew)	Popular Front (Abad Santos wing)	0	0.00
Total		1,672,504	100.00

Popular vote
Quezon	80.13%
Sumulong	17.85%
Others	2.00%

== See also ==
- Commission on Elections
- Politics of the Philippines
- Philippine elections
- 1941 Philippine general elections
