= Ganap Party =

Ganap Party Partido Ganap
- Leader: Benigno Ramos
- Preceded by: Sakdalista
- Armed wing: Makapili
- Ideology: Pro-Japan; Filipino nationalism
- Political position: Far-right
- National affiliation: KALIBAPI

The Ganap Party was a Filipino political party that grew from the Sakdalista movement. Benigno Ramos, who served as its leader, was also the founder of the Sakdalista movement. The party took its name from the Tagalog word ganap, which means "complete".

== Inception ==
In May 1935, the Sakdalista movement called for a popular uprising where patriots would peacefully march to seize control of the nation from American collaborators. This failed, with the collaborationist forces firing upon the protestors, killing hundreds and arresting thousands.

Sakdal party leader Benigno Ramos returned to the Philippines in 1938, after three years in exile protected by Japan. Anxious to regroup after the failed May uprising, he formed Ganap. It was therefore not surprising that the party was pro-Japan in outlook and saw an alliance with them as the road to independence. Ramos named the party Ganap because he was anxious to kickstart their election campaign. Their propaganda was so rabidly pro-Japanese and anti-American that Ramos was imprisoned on charges of swindling. Ganap drew its support base from the old Sakdal members, the disgruntled peasant class. The party was not without internal dissent, though, as opponents of Benigno Ramos remained in the old Sakdal Party, claiming that Ramos had become a Nacionalista turncoat and a puppet of Quezon.

== Japanese invasion ==
Ganap was able to organise as one of only four parties allowed to stand in the 1941 Philippine general election, when Manuel L. Quezon sought re-election. They fielded Celerino Tiongco for president, Pilar V. Aglipay of the Republican Party for vice president, and a 23-man senatorial slate. The party's main area of support was the Bulacan-Southern Luzon area, where the major land estates were located. As the party gained strength, membership spread to other provinces, such as La Union and Pangasinan. However, they didn't win any elective position in the said election. Celerino placed fourth, getting 22,474 votes, or 1.34% of the votes cast, Aglipay placed third, while none of their senatorial candidates ranked above 65th.

The Pacific War began on December 8, 1941 (Philippine time) with the attack on Pearl Harbor. After that mission, Japanese planes proceeded to bomb targets in Davao City. By Christmas, Japanese forces had landed on Philippine soil. Among the invaders was the pro-Japanese Katipunan general Artemio Ricarte. In early April 1942, the Japanese liberated Ramos from his imprisonment, without forgetting to mobilize Ganap support for the Japanese.

=== Role in the occupation ===
Ganap saw the Japanese as saviors of the Philippines, and its members readily collaborated with them during the occupation of the islands. Many Ganap members were recruited into the Yoin, or United Nippon, an organisation dedicated to performing auxiliary and menial duties for the Japanese expeditionary force.

Other Ganap members were absorbed by the Imperial Japanese Army, and were issued weapons. Widespread abuse of these duties and powers was reported, and guerrilla outfits retaliated by harassing Ganap members and their families. In return, the Ganap members would begin sending "Intelligence scouts" into the enemy guerrilla units and their families. If proven that they were anti-Japanese or have killed a fellow Ganap member, these outfits would be rooted out and assassinated.

The Nacionalista Party clique, led by then-President José P. Laurel and former Philippine Executive Commission Chairman Jorge B. Vargas, became worried over the growing power of the Ganap Party. Ganap was therefore sidelined when the occupiers decreed the creation of KALIBAPI into which they were merged. Although the party was a constituent of KALIBAPI, Ganap never exercised real influence within the new grouping, partly at the suggestion of Laurel and Vargas. Many of the original party followers would go on to form the basis of the militia group Makapili, which the Japanese founded in November 1944.

== 1941 Philippine general election ==
=== Candidates ===
For President
Celerino Tiongco	Ganap
For Vice President
Pilar V. Aglipay (guest)	Republican
For Senators
Wenceslao Asistido	Ganap
Gaudencio Bautista	Ganap
Sixto Bedrus	Ganap
Ciriaco V. Campomanes	Ganap
Marcelino Chavez	Ganap
Esteban Coruna	Ganap
Alfredo Dumlao	Ganap
Joaquin Flavier	Ganap
Jose Jabeon	Ganap
Mariano Lumbre	Ganap
Fernando Mangson	Ganap
Samson Palomares	Ganap
Vicente Pamatinat	Ganap
Antonio Ramos	Ganap
Perfecto Reyes	Ganap
Francisco Robles	Ganap
Antipas Soriano	Ganap
Florentino Subayno	Ganap
Aurelio Tankeko	Ganap
Eulalio Tolentino	Ganap
Ricardo Valdivia	Ganap
Prudencio Vega	Ganap
Pedro Zaragosa	Ganap

=== Results ===
Year	Presidential election				Vice presidential election			
Year	Candidate	Votes	%	Result	Candidate	Votes	%	Result
1941	Celerino Tiongco	22,474	1.34	Manuel Quezon (Nacionalista)	Pilar V. Aglipay	32,148	2.01	Sergio Osmeña (Nacionalista)
