= Popular Front (Philippines) =

Defunct Philippine political party

- Leader: Vicente Sotto
- Founders: Juan Sumulong
- Founded: 1934
- Dissolved: 1950
- Preceded by: Democrata Party

The Popular Front (Spanish: Frente Popular) was a political party founded in 1934 to oppose the then-dominant Nacionalista Party.

== History ==
=== Formation and early years ===
After the 1934 elections, the Popular Front was established mainly by poorly organized minorities (including some Democrata Party members), and was eventually reorganized in 1937 to be an official opposition party. The Popular Front lacked leadership and a program, despite the membership of Juan Sumulong, a former senator, former president and general Emilio Aguinaldo, and Philippine Independent Church head bishop Gregorio Aglipay. Of the 43 provincial governor seats, only 2 Popular Front members took office.

=== 1941 elections ===
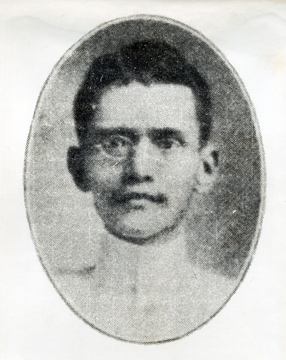
Pedro Abad Santos, leader of the left-wing faction

However, in November 1941, left-wing and right-wing factions arose in the party ranks, Sumulong leading the right-wing faction while Pedro Abad Santos led the hard-left. Abad Santos challenged each other's right to enroll under the Popular Front banner. Abad Santos accused Sumulong's faction members as members of the Democrata Nacional or Democrata Party, or being its identical twin, and being nationalists but "tools of the capitalists," aligned with Abad Santos' Marxist perspective. Sumulong blasted Abad Santos for spreading Communist ideas, and stated that Communists and their believers should not identify themselves as members of the Popular Front. The elections commission settled the dispute by recognizing the both factions, with Sumulong and Abad Santos as legitimate leaders of the party.

Both Sumulong and Abad Santos had their own presidential ambitions in 1941. Sumulong chose Emilio Javier as running mate, while Abad Santos picked Aglipay's wife as his running mate. Later Abad Santos withdrew his candidacy, but both factions were defeated by incumbents Manuel L. Quezon (president) and Sergio Osmeña (vice president). In the succeeding senate election, no one in the Popular Front slate won, and in the lower house, only 2 seats were secured. Only Vicente Sotto, a Cebuano statesman and member of the party who also lost in 1941, eventually became senator in 1946.

=== Peasant violence in Pampanga ===
In response to peasant violence in Pampanga in 1941, Governor Sotero Baluyut, with support from the Quezon administration, made efforts to undermine the influence of Popular Front mayors in the province along with the removal of some of its party members in power. These were made due to concerns of socialist backing.

== Electoral performance ==
=== Presidential and vice presidential elections ===
Year	Presidential election				Vice presidential election			
Year	Candidate	Votes	Vote share	Result	Candidate	Votes	Vote share	Result
1941	Juan Sumulong (Note: Sumulong wing only. The other wing (Abad Santos wing), supported Pedro Abad Santos who withdrew.)	298,608	17.85%	Manuel Quezon (Nacionalista)	Emilio Javier (Note: Sumulong wing only. The other wing (Abad Santos wing), supported Pilar Aglipay of Republican)	124,035	7.74%	Sergio Osmeña (Nacionalista)

=== Legislative elections ===
Senate elections	Senate Seats won	Result	President	Result	House Seats won	House elections
1941	0 / 24	Lost	Manuel Quezon	Lost	2 / 98	1941
1946	1 / 24	Lost	Manuel Roxas	Lost	1 / 98	1946
