= Modernist Party (Philippines) =

Defunct Philippine political party

Partido Modernista
- Founder: Hilario Moncado
- Founded: 1932
- Dissolved: c. late 1940s
- Ideology: Americanism; Philippine dominion status

The Modernist Party (Filipino: Partido Modernista) was a Philippine political party founded in 1932 by religious leader Hilario Moncado.

The party's principal platform was support for the dominion status of the Philippines, which sought to make the country a dominion of the United States.

Moncado ran under the party's banner in the 1934 senatorial election for the 10th district, but lost to Sergio Osmeña. In 1941, he ran for president but lost to incumbent President Manuel L. Quezon of the Nacionalista Party. Former President Emilio Aguinaldo initially ran as his vice-presidential running mate but later withdrew his candidacy.

Moncado made another bid for the presidency under the party's banner in 1946, but lost to Senate President Manuel Roxas, who ran under the Liberal wing of the Nacionalista Party (later the Liberal Party).

The party ceased to exist by the late 1940s after Moncado left for the United States.

== Electoral performance ==
=== Presidential and vice presidential elections ===
Year	Presidential election				Vice presidential election			
Year	Candidate	Votes	Vote share	Result	Candidate	Votes	Vote share	Result
1941	Hilario Moncado	10,726	0.64%	Manuel L. Quezon (Nacionalista)	Emilio Aguinaldo (withdrew)	0	0.00%	Sergio Osmeña (Nacionalista)
1946	Hilario Moncado	8,538	0.35%	Manuel Roxas (Liberal)	Lou Salvador	5,879	0.26%	Elpidio Quirino (Liberal)

=== Legislative elections ===
Congress of the Philippines
Senate			House of Representatives		
Year	Seats won	Result	Year	Seats won	Result
1934	0 / 24	Nacionalista Democratico won 8/11	1934	Did not participate	
1941	0 / 24	Nacionalista won 24/24	1941	Did not participate	
1946	0 / 16	Liberal won 9/16	1946	0 / 98	Liberal won 49/98
1947	0 / 8	Liberal won 7/8	1946	0 / 98	Liberal won 49/98
