= Melecio Arranz =

Filipino politician

The Honorable Melecio Arranz
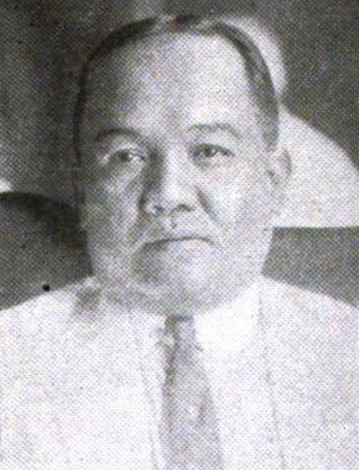
- Senatorial portrait of Arranz, published by Benipayo Press, c. 1935

President pro tempore of the Senate of the Philippines
- In office May 25, 1946 – December 30, 1949
- President: Manuel Roxas
- Preceded by: Elpidio Quirino
- Succeeded by: Quintín Paredes

Senate Majority Leader
- In office June 9, 1945 – May 25, 1946
- President: Sergio Osmeña
- Preceded by: Claro M. Recto
- Succeeded by: Vicente J. Francisco

Senator of the Philippines
- In office May 25, 1945 – December 30, 1951

Member of the National Assembly (Second Philippine Republic) from Cagayan
- In office October 17, 1943 – February 2, 1944 Serving with Nicanor Carag

Senator of the Philippines from the 1st district
- In office June 5, 1928 – September 16, 1935 Serving with Elpidio Quirino
- Preceded by: Isabelo de los Reyes
- Succeeded by: Post abolished

Personal details
- Born: May 24, 1888 Alcala, Cagayan, Captaincy General of the Philippines
- Died: April 24, 1966 (aged 77) Manila, Philippines
- Party: Liberal (1946–1966)
- Other political affiliations: Nacionalista (1928–1946); KALIBAPI (1942–1945)
- Spouse: Consuelo Argüelles Arranz
- Children: 5
- Education: University of Santo Tomas
- Occupation: Politician
- Profession: Civil engineer

Melecio Arranz y Alivin (May 24, 1888 – April 24, 1966) was a Filipino politician and engineer, born in Alcala, Cagayan.

== Early life and career ==
Arranz obtained his degree of Bachelor of Arts from Colegio de San Albero Magno and his Bachelor of Science in Civil Engineering from the University of Santo Tomas. His government service began in 1914, when he worked as Junior Assistant Engineer at the Bureau of Public Works. In 1919, he became District Engineer of Bataan and Rizal and later was promoted to Supervising District Engineer.

== Political career ==
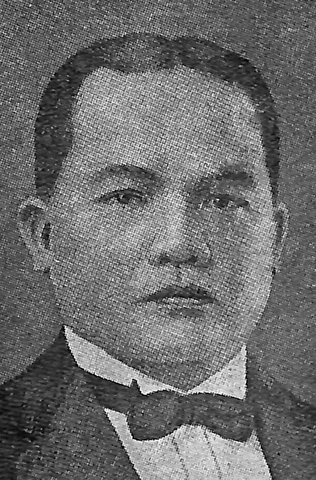
Arranz in 1935

As Senator, he was elected in 1928 representing the First Senatorial District comprising Cagayan, Isabela, Ilocos Norte, Ilocos Sur and Abra. Reelected in 1934, 1941 and 1946, his term ended in 1951. He was the majority leader of the Senate of the Philippines from 1945 to 1946. He was floor leader and Chairman of the Committee on Public Works and Communications (1936) and floor leader and Senate President Pro-Tempore (1946–1949).

Arranz also served in the Philippine Council of State in 1934 and in the Japanese-sponsored Preparatory Committee on Philippine Independence, which laid out the establishment of the Second Philippine Republic in 1943.

In 1947, he was appointed Chief Delegate of the Philippines to the United Nations Commission on Korea.

== Personal life and death ==
Arranz was married to Consuelo Arguelles and had five children. He died on April 24, 1966.
