= Juan Sumulong =

Philippine politician (1875–1942)

The Honorable Juan M. Sumulong
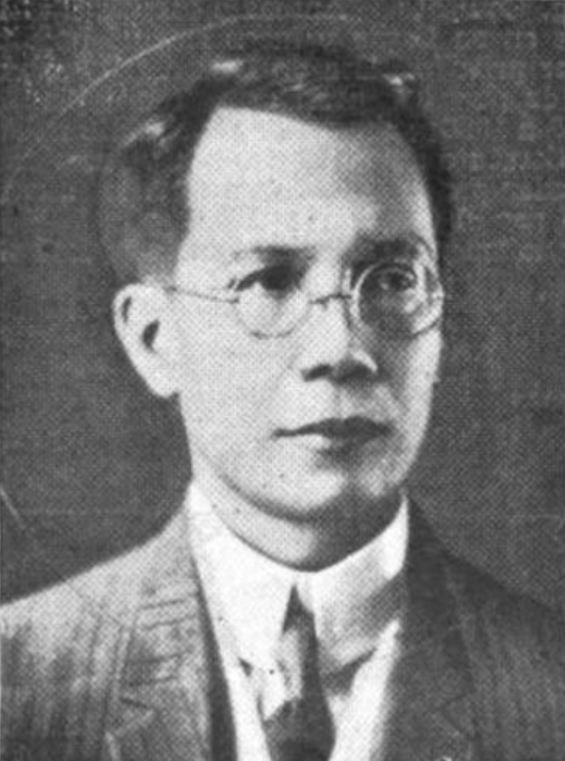
- Senatorial portrait of Sumulong, published by Benipayo Press, c. 1935

Senator of the Philippines from the 4th District
- In office June 5, 1934 – September 16, 1935 Serving with Juan Nolasco
- Preceded by: José G. Generoso
- Succeeded by: Position abolished
- In office 1925–1931 Serving with Emiliano Tria Tirona (1925–1928) and José G. Generoso (1928–1931)
- Preceded by: Ramon J. Fernandez
- Succeeded by: Juan Nolasco

Personal details
- Born: Juan Sumulong y Márquez; December 27, 1875 Antipolo, Morong, Captaincy General of the Philippines
- Died: January 9, 1942 (aged 66) Manila, Philippine Commonwealth
- Party: Popular Front (1936–1942)
- Other political affiliations: Nacionalista (1934–1936); Democrata (1917–1931); Progresista (1907–1917)
- Spouse: Maria Salome Sumulong
- Relations: Sumulong family Corazon Aquino (granddaughter); Peping Cojuangco (grandson); Josephine C. Reyes (granddaughter); Benigno Aquino III (great-grandson); Kris Aquino (great-granddaughter)
- Children: 11 (including Lorenzo, Francisco and Demetria)
- Education: Colegio de San Juan de Letran (BA); University of Santo Tomas (LL.B)
- Occupation: Politician
- Known for: Member of the opposition against Manuel L. Quezon
- Nickname(s): DJS, Don Juan

Juan Marquez Sumulong Sr. (born Juan Sumulong y Márquez; December 27, 1875 – January 9, 1942) was a Filipino former revolutionary, journalist, lawyer, educator and politician from the province of Rizal. He was the president of the opposition party which ran against Manuel L. Quezon's Nacionalista Party in the 1941 presidential election of the Philippine Commonwealth. He is also the maternal great-grandfather of former President Benigno Aquino III.

== Early life ==
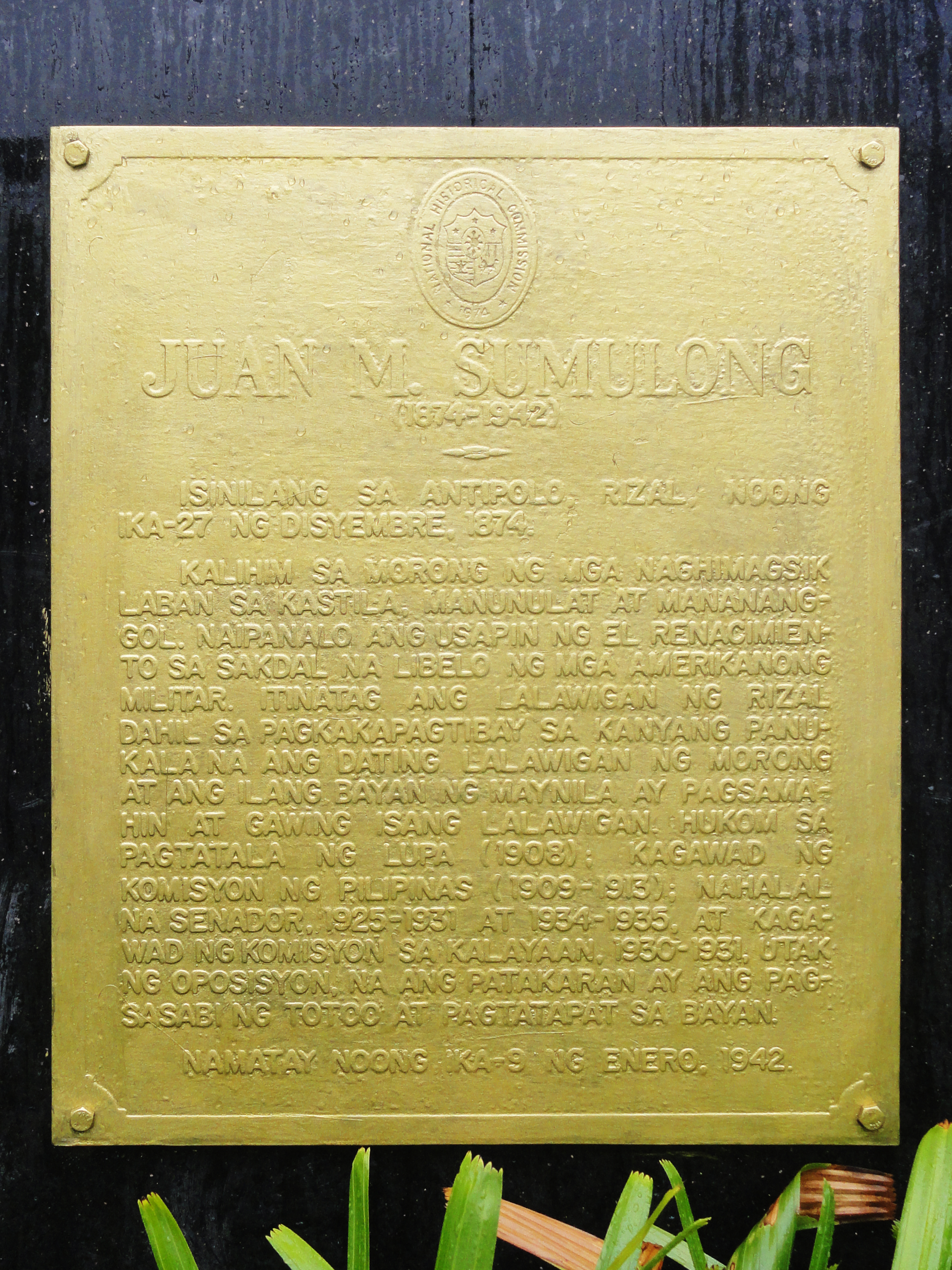
Historical marker unveiled in 1974 in Antipolo

Juan Marquez Sumulong was the brains of the opposition during the ascendancy of Manuel L. Quezon. He was born in Antipolo, Distrito de Morong (now part of Rizal province) on December 27, 1875, to Policarpio Sumulong, a tenant farmer who became a Capitan municipal (mayor) of Antipolo, and Arcadia Marquez.

== Education ==
After finishing his primary education in his hometown, he went to Manila and studied at the Colegio de San Juan de Letran. To attend school, he had to walk each day from his residence in Tondo to his school in Intramuros. Since he could not afford his room and board, as payment, he helped his landlady prepare food for breakfast while peddling her homemade cigars after school in the mornings. He did his own laundry. During rainy days, he wore wooden clogs and only upon reaching school he would wear his leather shoes which he carried wrapped in paper. Nevertheless, he completed his education earning a Bachelor of Arts degree. Subsequently, he attended the University of Santo Tomas and took up law.

When the revolution against Spain broke out, he joined the revolutionists headquartered in Morong province (now Rizal). After the restoration of peace following the Filipino-American War, he served as a private secretary to the Filipino civil governor of Morong Province with headquarters in Antipolo. In a meeting held at the Pasig Church on June 5, 1901, to discuss the fusion of Morong Province and the Province of Manila, councilor Sumulong spoke in favor of such a union. It was ultimately approved and the new province was named Rizal.

He became a journalist, joining La Patria as a reporter and becoming its city editor after three months. He analyzed the political situations for La Democracia, the Federal Party's official publication, of which he was the editor for a long time.

== Legal and political career ==
After passing the bar examinations in 1901, he practiced law and at the same time taught Constitutional Law at the Escuela de Derecho. One of the first cases he handled was the boundary dispute between Antipolo and the neighboring town of Cainta. He won the case for his hometown. He and Rafael Palma also successfully defended the newspaper El Renacimiento in a libel suit filed by some American Constabulary officials, which was also the first case that the American government lost. The paper exposed the abuses committed by the military officers against the citizens of Cavite in the concentration camp in Bacoor. In June 1902, these two young lawyers secured from Governor William Howard Taft the pardon of Isabelo de los Reyes who was accused of "conspiracy" in organizing a labor union that staged the first organized strike in the Philippines. He was made Judge of the Court of First Instance in 1906 and of the Court of Land Registration in 1908. He was also a member of the Philippine Commission from 1909 to 1913. He was also offered a position inside the Supreme Court by the U.S. President William H. Taft, which he declined.

In 1904, while he was in the United States as a member of the Honorary Commission to the St. Louis Exposition he published in an American journal the independence aspiration of the Filipinos, realizing the inadvisability of the statehood plan.

Sumulong was vice-president of the Partido Nacional Progresista that was organized on January 2, 1907. The new political party aimed to achieve Philippine independence by progressive stages. He ran as its candidate for a seat in the first Philippine Assembly in the July 30 elections but lost to the Nacionalist Party candidate. He ran for and lost the position of senator for the Fourth Senatorial District in the 1916 general elections.

Because of the overwhelming Nacionalista victories in the 1916 elections, the minority groups, Sumulong's Progresistas and the Partido Democrata Nacional of Teodoro Sandiko, merged in August 1917 to form the Democrata Party. In 1919, Sumulong became president of this party.

Sumulong was "an effective public speaker with a high reputation for intellectual capacity and integrity" according to Claro M. Recto Jr., but he lost his senatorial bid in 1922 because of an alleged defect in the party platform. In 1925, he was elected finally to a six-year term as senator for the Fourth Senatorial District, composed of Manila, Rizal, Laguna and Bataan.

As a senator, he had his famous debate with Senate President Manuel L. Quezon on the amendments to the Corporation Law. He also voiced out his vehement opposition to the enactment of the Belo Act, giving the Governor-General a yearly appropriation fund for military and technical advisers known as the Belo Boys. He authored the law creating the gasoline tax and the law regarding the books of accounts to be kept by merchants, especially by Chinese.

From 1930 to 1931, he was in Washington D.C. as a member of the Philippine Independence Mission. When the first Philippine Independence Act, known as the Hare-Hawes Cutting Act, was enacted by the U.S. Congress, he decided to oppose its acceptance by the Filipino people mainly because of its provision that even after Philippine independence, the United States will continue to exercise sovereignty over U.S. Military reservations in the Philippines. Quezon, Emilio Aguinaldo, Claro M. Recto and many others opposed the HHC Act and they became known as the Antis. Osmena, Roxas, and others favoring it became known as the Pros.

Due to poor health, he resigned from the presidency of the Democrata Party on the eve of the election on June 2, 1931. His resignation led to the dissolution of the party.

In the election of June 5, 1934 for senator of the Fourth Senatorial District, he ran as the candidate of the Antis. He won and the Antis became the party in power. On August 18, the Nacionalista and Democrata "Antis" fused into a new political party called Partido Nacionalista Democrata with Quezon as president and Sumulong as vice-president. The coalition in 1935 of this party and the opposition party of Osmeña was bitterly denounced by Sumulong in his manifesto entitled "After the Coalition, the Deluge". He believed that political representation was imbalanced and that the coalition would lead to an oligarchy and to the development of a revolutionary opposition. This was already evident, he warned, in the growth of communism and Sakdalism. The Sakdal uprising in May 1935 lent credence to Sumulong's warnings.

Sumulong, who long before Quezon adopted the slogan of "social justice", broke up with the latter and continued keeping alive an opposition. Sumulong maintained that the establishment of permanent U.S. naval bases would prove disastrous to the independent Philippines. Moreover, he believed that the longer free trade is continued, the more difficult it would be for the Philippines to shake off economic bondage.

== Death ==
In 1941, he ran against Quezon for the Presidency in spite of his failing health. Two weeks before the elections, he fell ill and was forced to stay in bed until his death on January 9, 1942. Several hours before his death, he told Jorge Bocobo and Jose Fabella that he and his party would not join in the formation of a Japanese–sponsored government.

== Personal life ==
He was married to a distant cousin, Maria Salome Sumulong. They had 11 children, four of whom died, the seven surviving being Lumen, Demetria, Lorenzo, Paz, Juan S. Sumulong Jr., Belen and Francisco.

Demetria Sumulong married Jose Chichioco Cojuangco of Tarlac. Their fourth child (Sumulong's granddaughter) was Corazon C. Aquino, 11th President of the Philippines (1986–1992), thus her son (Sumulong's great-grandson) is Benigno Aquino III, the 15th President of the Philippines.

== Legacy ==
- Juan Sumulong Memorial School system, a set of private secondary schools, was named after him.
- Sumulong Highway, constructed in the 1960s, the highway connecting Rizal province to Metro Manila through Marikina was also named after him.

== Ancestry ==
Ancestors of Juan Sumulong

16. Bernardino Sumulong
8. Porfirio Sumulong
17. Brígida Quimpo
4. Pedro Sumulong
9. Escolástica Zamuco
2. Policarpio Sumulong
5. Gerónima Saguinsin
1. Juan Sumulong
3. Arcadia Márquez
7. Ildefonsa Márquez
