= Hilario Moncado =

Filipino religious and political leader

Hilario Camino Moncado
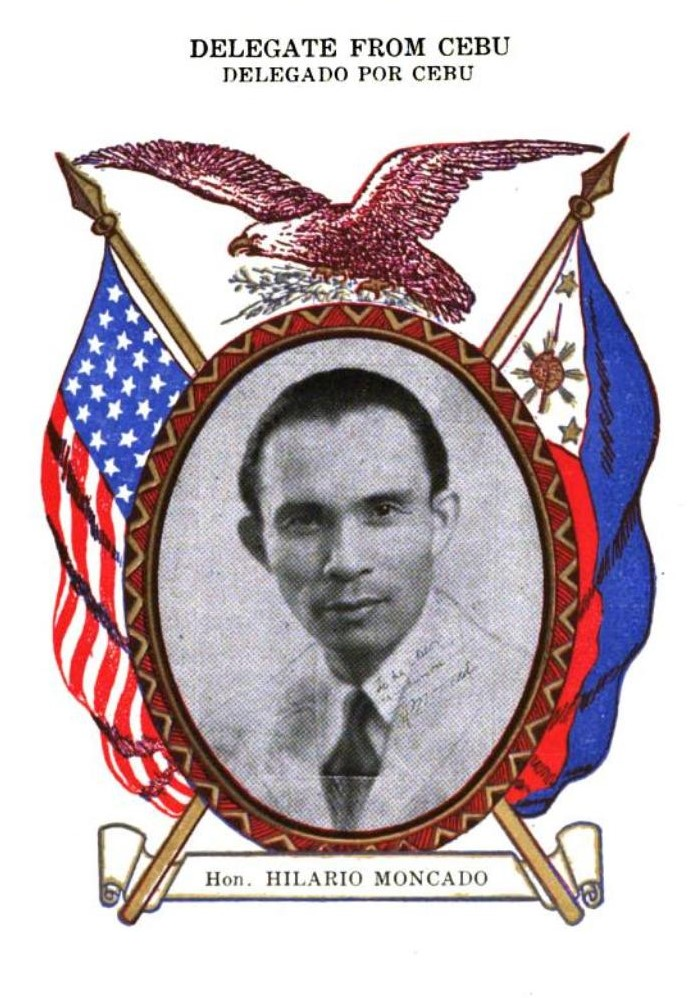
- Moncado as a delegate to the Philippine Constitutional Convention, published by Benipayo Press (c. 1935)

Delegate to the 1934 Constitutional Convention
- In office July 30, 1934 – February 8, 1935

Personal details
- Born: Hilarion Camino Moncada; November 4, 1898 Balamban, Cebu, Captaincy General of the Philippines
- Died: April 9, 1956 (aged 57) Agua Caliente, Tijuana, Mexico

Hilario Camino Moncado (November 4, 1898 – April 9, 1956) was a Filipino religious and political leader. He was the founder and leader of the Filipino Crusaders World Army (formerly the Filipino Federation of America), a religious and patriotic group in the Philippines colloquially known as the Moncadistas.

== Early life and education ==
Moncado was born in Pondol, Balamban, Cebu, to a poor rural family. His parents were recorded in official biographies of the Filipino Federation of America as Gregorio Moncado and Filomena Moncado y Camino. The date of his birth in FFA sources is November 4, 1898. However, his official baptismal certificate show that he was actually born on November 3, 1895, and baptized on November 4, 1895, under the name Hilarion Camino Moncada.

The discrepancy in the date is explained by Buenaventura (1991) as a way for his religious organization to justify the claim that he was a reincarnation of José Rizal. Since Rizal died in 1896, Moncado can not have a birthdate before Rizal's death.

Moncado was unusually tall for a Filipino and for the time period. He was described as being over 6 ft (1.8 m) tall.

He applied to the Hawaiian Sugar Planters' Association (HSPA) and emigrated to Honolulu, Hawaii in 1914. His age during this period is unknown, but the official HSPA documents puts him down as 21. It is assumed that he lied about his age for the HSPA (since the minimum age requirement was 18), a very common practice among Sakadas. Most sources agree that he was a minor during his emigration. His name in the HSPA contract (no. 10.221) was also spelled as Hilarion Moncada.

He worked with Filipino sugarcane laborers in Hawaii for a year, before moving to the West Coast of the United States. He worked in San Francisco (where he put himself through high school), then at a salmon cannery in Alaska, before settling down in Los Angeles where he spent most of his life. He obtained an LL.B. from the University of Southern California's law school in Los Angeles. He claims to have further acquired a masters (M.A.) and an honorary doctorate (LL.D.) during his residence in Los Angeles, thereafter styling himself as "Dr. Hilario Camino Moncado." Though these credentials are in question as they were from an unaccredited university that have since become defunct. His name was legally changed to Hilario Camino Moncado around 1919, probably when he was living in San Francisco.

== Filipino Federation of America ==
On December 27, 1925, Moncado founded the Filipino Federation of America, Incorporated (FFA) in Los Angeles, a labor movement which aims to unite the Filipino diaspora in the United States. The organization was originally a mutual aid fraternal organization, but it later included strong esoteric religious elements and also started advocating for larger issues like the Philippine-American relations and the question of Philippine independence. He started publishing a nationalistic and religious newsletter for the FFA every two weeks, which he called Equifrilibricum. This later became The Filipino Nation and finally, The Modernist.

Members of the FFA were broadly divided into the "material" and the "spiritual" workers. The latter consists of celibate members who closely follow and study the religious elements of the organization under the "spiritual leaders". While the former were fee-paying regular members who were usually married.

The FFA was active in supporting local white politicians and soliciting endorsements from local organizations. They prominently campaigned against vice. They also participated in parades, sporting events, and hosted conventions.

The FFA gained public attention when it organized the Rizal Day celebrations in Los Angeles in December 1926. They decorated downtown Los Angeles with flags of the Philippines and the United States, as well as organized other events fostering Flipino nationalism. The attention it received increased the FFA's membership from 34 in 1926 to almost 700 by the end of 1928. In 1928, Moncado visited Hawaii several times and started recruiting Sakadas, which initially put him under suspicion by the HSPA of labor agitation. in 1931, the FFA hosted a nine-day convention celebrating the founding of the FFA in the Royal Hawaiian Hotel. Moncado hosted the occasion and various dignitaries were invited, including the governor of Hawaii and other public officials, alongside hundreds of delegates from various islands in Hawaii.

In 1930, Moncado was received in the White House by President Herbert Hoover. Moncado presented Hoover with a gold medal "in appreciation of his establishment of peace and goodwill".

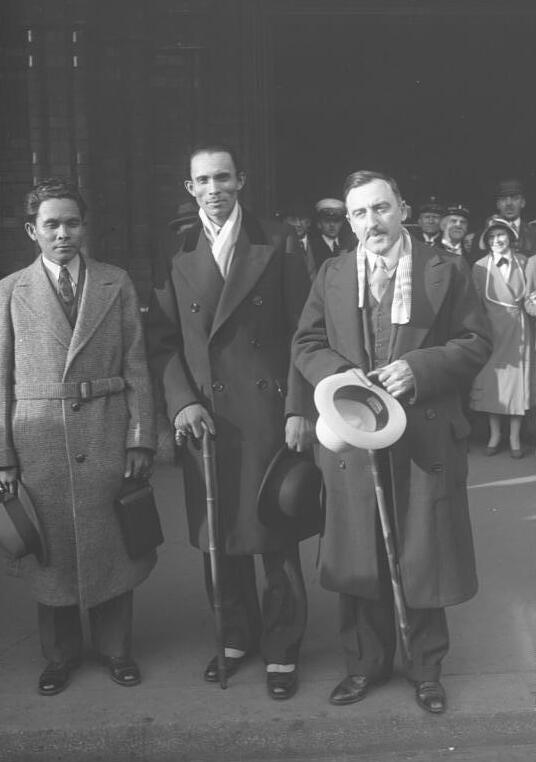
Hilario Camino Moncado (middle) in Berlin (1931)

By the mid-1930s, the FFA claimed to have 20,000 members, most of which were from California and Hawaii. It had permanent headquarters in Los Angeles, Stockton, Honolulu, and Hilo; with smaller branches scattered throughout farming regions throughout the West Coast of the United States and Hawaii. The FFA had also acquired the approval of the HSPA and plantation owners, as Moncado discouraged vice and gambling among their members, and later officially denounced labor unions. FFA workers were even brought in to break a workers' strike in a pineapple plantation in Molokai in 1937.

The majority of the members were Sakadas (most of whom are laborers for the HSPA) and other Filipino migrants in Hawaii and California. Membership into the organization required paying a membership fee. This was initially set at $100 (with another $10 for the FFA pin), which was a relatively exorbitant amount, because most Filipino laborers in the United States during the Great Depression had very low wages.

== Political campaigns in the Philippines and World War II ==
In 1932, Moncado sent Lorenzo de los Reyes (the "spiritual leader" of the FFA) and a group of other FFA leaders to the Philippines, to establish their first colony in Mindanao. On November 15, 1932, the first formal branch of the FFA was established in Cebu. Reyes died in Moncado's hometown of Balamban on August 31, 1937, after an illness. He was succeeded by his right-hand man, Geraldo Alvaro, who became the new spiritual leader of the FFA under the title Bag-ong Yuta ("new earth"). Like Reyes, he continued introducing and expanding the "mystical" practices in the FFA.

After the Tydings–McDuffie Act was passed in 1934 (which established the date of July 4, 1946 for the Philippine independence), one of the key driving issues for membership in the FFA was lost. FFA increasingly turned its focus on its religious aspect. Moncado also started campaigning politically in the Philippines.

Moncado launched a senatorial campaign in Cebu against Sergio Osmeña in 1934, which he lost. He did succeed in being elected as the delegate of the 7th congressional district of Cebu to the 1934 Constitutional Convention.

After a brief return to the United States via the newly inaugurated Hawaii Clipper flying boat service, he returned to the Philippines in 1938. Moncado ran again for senator in Lanao against Tomas Cabili in 1938, which he also lost.

Moncado married the Filipina vaudeville singer-actress Diana Toy (popularly known as "Toy-toy") in 1939. They adopted two children, Mario and Luz.

In September 1941, Moncado once again returned to the Philippines and ran as a candidate in the 1941 presidential elections of the Commonwealth of the Philippines. He was trapped there at the outbreak of World War II hostilities between the United States (including the Philippines) and the Empire of Japan after the Attack on Pearl Harbor in December 1941.

In the mid-1940s during the war, the core group of married members who did both "material" and "spiritual" work in the Philippines also formed the Filipino Crusaders World Army (FCWA). According to FFA accounts, Moncado allegedly led the FCWA as "Commander X" in guerilla warfare against the Japanese occupation of the Philippines. He was also allegedly arrested and tortured by the Japanese for his connections to the United States, but was later released.

== Post-World War II and Death ==
After the end of World War II, Moncado was conversely accused of treason and of collaboration with the Empire of Japan. This was partly due to Moncado's wealth. At the end of the war, court records show he still had an estimated gross annual income of $19,000 ($313,695 in 2025) in addition to $18,000 ($297,184 in 2025) in the bank and his real estate properties in Hawaii and California worth around $100,000 ($1.65 million in 2025). He was arrested on April 4, 1945, at his residence in Manila by the Counter Intelligence Corps (CIC) of the United States Army. The charges were dismissed in February 1948 after the January 1948 proclamation of full amnesty for all suspected collaborators.

Moncado again launched a presidential campaign to be the first president of the newly independent Republic of the Philippines in 1946, against Manuel Roxas and Sergio Osmeña. He ran on the platform of pursuing a "Dominion" status for the Philippines by the United States (basically a perpetual commonwealth) under the Modernist Party. He also started styling himself as a "five-star general" (eventually promoting himself to a "six-star general"), and appeared in public in an army uniform. He lost the elections to Manuel Roxas, gaining only 0.35% of the votes in the 1946 Philippine presidential election. He returned to the United States in 1948.

The independence of the Philippines led to severe problems for the organization's members. The members who were trapped in the Philippines due to World War II were barred from returning to the United States due to newly imposed immigration quotas.

Moncado himself was fighting a legal battle to prevent his own deportation from the United States due to charges of overstaying. He eventually voluntarily moved to Baja California in Mexico in 1954 with his wife, though he continued to try to obtain US citizenship for him and his wife. He died in Mexico on April 8, 1956.

== Legacy ==
Four days before his death, Moncado visited Los Angeles on April 4, 1956, where he reportedly told a group of his followers that "The work of the Filipino Federation of America is finished. Our work now is Religion." This was taken by the organization's members as a directive to organize an "Equifrilibrium" religion.

After his death, the membership numbers of the FFA started to decline rapidly. A leadership struggle ensued between the various "material" and "spiritual" branches of the FFA. The mainstream faction (mostly in Hawaii) sided with Moncado's widow, Diana Toy Moncado, who had assumed leadership of the FFA.

Other members refused to recognize Diana Toy Moncado as the successor, because she remained a devout Catholic and had introduced new Catholic rituals and imagery into the organization. This faction (mostly California-based members), elected Victor Ramajo as their leader and used the FFA's old headquarters in Stockton. This faction saw themselves as the legitimate successor of the FFA and sued Diana Toy Moncado for ownership of the FFA properties in Kalihi and Manoa in Hawaii which was used by the main "spiritual" branch of the FFA.

The California group lost the legal battle, whereupon Diana Toy Moncado established the Moncado Foundation of America, which she managed along with their adopted children, until her death in the early 1960s.

Other members in the United States chose to remain independent of the leadership struggle and continued to follow Moncado's teachings in their own private ways. Though now splintered into smaller groups, most of them still met regularly for the anniversary of the FFA's foundation every December 27.

The Filipino Crusaders World Army (FCWA) factions in Mindanao and Cebu, on the other hand, became a recognized Christian religious sect in the Philippines colloquially known as the "Moncadistas". As of 2021, there are an estimated 20,000 Moncadistas remaining throughout the Philippines. Regardless, Moncadista colonies in the Philippines are independent from each other and are led by different leaders.

== Mysticism ==
The FFA was characterized as "quasi-religious", with mystical symbolism derived from Christian beliefs, Filipino folk beliefs, numerology, albularyo practices, and the dios-dios movements of the early 20th century. In their initial phase, they put particular importance on the number 12 (a concept referred to as doce-doce, "twelve-twelve"). The FFA started out with 12 individuals with 12 outlined objectives. The original "matriculate members" were initially subdivided into 12 divisions, each with 12 lodges. And each lodge had 12 members.

Moncado himself started assuming the title of the spiritual "Master" known as "Equifrilibrium", in addition to his role as a political leader in the FFA. Many of the FFA's "spiritual" practices were under the guidance of Lorenzo de los Reyes, a founding member of the FFA. Reyes was instrumental in developing and promoting the "divinity" of Moncado. As such, some members of the FFA in Hawaii credit both Moncado and Reyes as the founders of the FFA.

The word "Equifrilibrium" was allegedly from Equi ("I am the Way of Equality"), Frili ("I am the Truth of Fraternity"), and Brium ("I am the Life of Liberty and the Master of Equifrilibricum"). It referred to his "divine" persona. "Equifrilibricum" (with a 'c'), on the other hand, was his "material" identity. All of these terms are not actually Latin, though they appear to be and are claimed to be Latin by FFA members.

Moncado claims to be the "third" reincarnation of Christ through José Rizal, representing both the "political" (Rizal) and the "spiritual" (Christ). He claims that the FFA members would be among the chosen few who would be saved at the Apocalypse.

All FFA members joining the organization underwent "spiritual" initiation. They were introduced to specially-constructed prayers with instructions on what time of day they could be performed. They were also encouraged to fast for as long and as frequently as they can on a voluntary basis. Certain members can also choose to become "spiritual" members, by studying under Reyes. Unlike the other regular "material" members, "spiritual" members practiced celibacy, did not cut their hair (including beards), and practiced a vegetarian and raw diet (meat and fish are forbidden).

Modern Moncadistas still follow these tenets, now simplified into three rules: 1) You should not cut your hair; 2) You should not hurt your fellow; and 3) You should not eat meat. They also do not drink alcohol or smoke cigarettes. However, younger members of the organization are abandoning some of these tenets. In particular, cooked food is now allowed in most cases.

== Criticism ==
The FFA (and the succeeding Moncadista movement) is commonly characterized as a cult, even during Moncado's lifetime. It was also often criticized by the Filipino-American community for misrepresenting the image of Filipinos, as well as for exploiting Sakadas with "fakery". The first of such criticisms were published in 1930 in Los Angeles, in a pamphlet written by a Filipino government scholar (pensionado) Primo E. Quevado.

Another prominent early critic was the Filipino-American Methodist minister Nicolas C. Dizon, who published his criticism in Honolulu in 1931. Dizon characterized the FFA as "unethical" in promoting superstitious beliefs and practices.

FFA members were also often directly ridiculed by other Filipino-Americans. Despite this, the increasing ridicule and criticism against the FFA only reinforced the members' belief in the "Messianic" nature of the movement and the "Christ-like" image of Moncado. FFA preachers who were subjected to public ridicule were instructed to remain peaceful and avoid fighting back, accepting it as a form of "persecution".

Modern Moncadistas are also often derisively called "Bungkagistas", a portmanteau of bungkag (literally "disordered", in the context of "confused") and "Moncadista".
