= Political history of the Philippines =

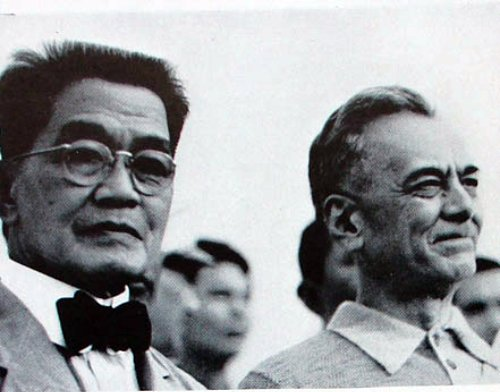
Emilio Aguinaldo, who led the Philippine Revolution against Spain, and Manuel L. Quezon, President of the autonomous Commonwealth of the Philippines under the United States

Early polities in what is now the Philippines were small entities known as barangays, although some larger states were established following the arrival of Hinduism and Islam through regional trade networks. The arrival of Spanish settlers began a period of Spanish expansion which led to the creation of the Captaincy General of the Philippines, governed out of Manila. While technically part of New Spain, the Philippines functioned mostly autonomously. The reliance on native leaders to help govern led to the creation of an elite class known as the principalia. Spanish control was never firmly established over much of its claimed territory, with some inland and Islamic regions remaining effectively independent.

The 19th century saw a significant social change, and the development of a distinct Filipino identity among the mestizo elite. Members of the educated Ilustrado class, influenced by liberal ideas, launched the Propaganda Movement. Rejection by Spanish authorities led to a national awakening, the emergence of an independence movement, and a revolution which became entwined with the Spanish–American War. While the revolutionaries declared independence, Spain ceded the Philippines to the United States in 1898. Through the subsequent Philippine–American War and later actions, the United States established effective administration over the entire archipelago and introduced political structures that reflected those of the United States.

The pre-existing elite was entrenched within the new political system, and the dominant Nacionalista Party steadily gained more control over its institutions. In 1935 the autonomous Commonwealth of the Philippines was established, giving the Philippines its own constitution and a powerful President. Plans for independence were interrupted by Japanese invasion during World War II. The Japanese established the nominally independent Second Philippine Republic, but American and Allied reconquest restored the Commonwealth and led to full independence in 1946. This period saw the emergence of a two-party system, with the Liberal Party and the Nacionalistas exchanging control of the country. Both parties were led by elites and shared similar politics. Early presidents had to contend with the left-wing rural Hukbalahap Rebellion.

The two-party system came to an end under President Ferdinand Marcos, who declared martial law in 1972. Despite strengthening Communist and Islamic separatist rebellions, Marcos retained firm control of the country until economic issues and disenchantment with corruption led to greater opposition. Opponents consolidated around Corazon Aquino, the widow of an assassinated opposition politician. After Marcos was declared winner of a snap election in 1986, military and public protests led to the People Power Revolution which removed Marcos and installed Aquino. A new constitution increased the limits of Presidential power, including creating a single-term limit. Since then, an unstable multi-party system has emerged on the national level, which has been challenged by a series of crises including several attempted coups, a presidential impeachment, and two more public mass movements. This period also saw some political power decentralized to local government and the establishment of the autonomous Bangsamoro region in Muslim Mindanao.

== Pre-Spanish era ==
Before the arrival of Ferdinand Magellan, the Philippines was split into numerous barangays, small states that were linked through region-wide trade networks. The name "barangay" is thought to come from the word balangay, which refers to boats used by the Austronesian people to reach the Philippines. These societies had three classes: the nobility, freemen, and serfs and slaves. They were led by powerful individuals now called datus, although different cultures used different terms. The arrival of Hindu influence increased the power of Indianized datus. The first large state was Sulu, which adopted Islam in the 15th century. This system then spread to the nearby Sultanate of Maguindanao and the Kingdom of Maynila. Ferdinand Magellan's death in 1521 can be partly attributed to a dispute between Lapu-Lapu and Rajah Humabon for control of Cebu. Spanish Captain-General Miguel López de Legazpi established a settlement in Cebu in 1565. Maynila was conquered in 1571, and Manila subsequently became the center of Spanish administration. Spain gradually conquered the majority of the modern Philippines, although full control was never established over some Muslim areas in the south and in the Cordillera highlands.

== Spanish era ==
=== Colonization and governance ===
Under Spanish rule, barangays were consolidated into urban towns, aiding with control and a shift to a sedentary agricultural society. Nonetheless, the barangay structures were retained (becoming known as barrio), and used as a means to record community identity. Rule during the Spanish era was dominated by the Church, especially friars from Spanish religious orders. Local priests often held powers in towns, carrying out Spanish orders and collecting taxes. In areas where the population had not been consolidated into towns, priests travelled between villages. Ultimate power was held by the King and the Council of the Indies, with the Philippines being part of New Spain. However, due to their distance from both New Spain and Spain itself, the Captaincy General of the Philippines functioned practically autonomously and royal decrees had limited effect. The Philippines had their own Governor, and a judicial body was established in 1583.

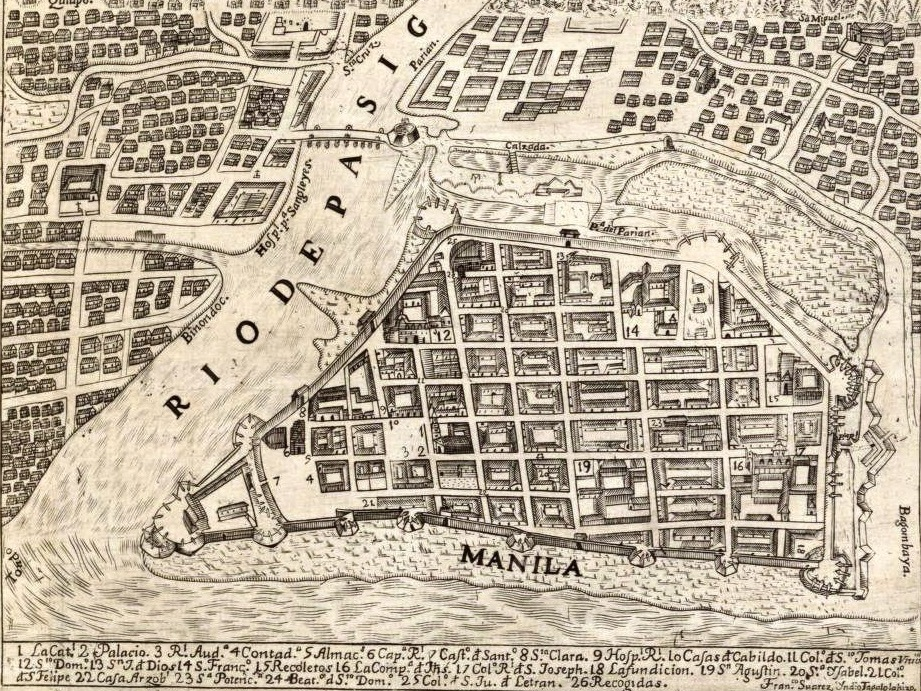
The Spanish established Manila as the capital of the Captaincy General of the Philippines.

Direct Spanish rule did not extend far beyond Manila. Due to the small number of Spanish officials on the islands, which numbered in the tens, locals were relied upon for administration. Existing datus were co-opted to manage barangays and nominate individuals for provincial government. Representatives of the Catholic Church continued to be the most significant direct Spanish presence. Several revolts erupted against Spain, but all were defeated. Some revolts, such as the Tondo Conspiracy, led to greater local participation in the bureaucracy, and the bringing of local elites into a patronage system to prevent further rebellion. The establishment of towns created administrative positions local elites could fill. Traditional native elites, along with some native officeholders and high-value tax payers, became part of a group known as the principalia. This group could make recommendations to the Spanish governor regarding administrative appointments, although they held no direct power. While they were just municipal office-holders, for some their status allowed them to avail of government patronage, and gain special permits and exemptions. Over time, this elite class became more culturally distinct, gaining an education unavailable to most and intermarrying with Spanish officials and Chinese merchants.

Pre-existing trading networks were blocked by Spanish authorities, with all trade instead going to Spanish colonies in the New World. Despite increasing economic activity, the archipelago remained divided by regional identity and language. Some areas remained out of effective Spanish control, including much of Mindanao, the Sulu archipelago, and Palawan. There was conflict between these areas and the Spanish throughout the Spanish period. In the Cordillera highlands, firm Spanish control was limited to the lowland fringes. Inward migration to escape Spanish control and an increase in trade saw settlements in interior areas increase in population and political complexity.

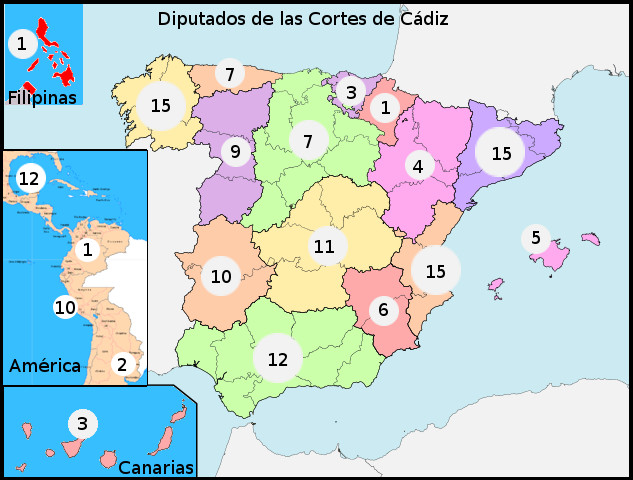
Under the short-lived Spanish Constitution of 1812, the Philippines (top left) had direct representation in the Cortes of Cádiz.

In a process beginning in the late 18th century that would continue for the remainder of Spanish rule, the government tried to shift power from the friars of independent religious orders towards the "secular clergy" of Catholic priests. These priests included local mestizos, and even indios. In the 19th century, Philippine ports opened to world trade and shifts started occurring within Filipino society. In 1808, when Joseph Bonaparte became king of Spain, the liberal constitution of Cadiz was adopted, giving the Philippines representation in the Spanish Cortes. However, once the Spanish overthrew the Bonapartes, the Philippine, and indeed colonial, representation in the Spanish Cortes was rescinded. From 1836, the Philippines were directly governed by the Ministry of Overseas.

Political turmoil in Spain led to 24 governors being appointed to the Philippines from 1800 to 1860, often lacking any experience with the country. Significant political reforms began in the 1860s, with a couple of decades seeing the creation of a cabinet under the Governor-General and the division of executive and judicial power. Societal changes in Spain and the Philippines led to an expansion of the Philippine bureaucracy and its civil service positions, predominantly for the educated living in urban areas, although the highest levels continued to remain in the hand of those born in Spain. This, combined with a shifting economy, saw more complex social structures emerge with new upper and middle classes. A changing economy also brought poverty, which led to raiding and the founding of the Civil Guard. Education reforms in the 1860s expanded access to higher education. The 19th century also saw further attempts to establish control of the mountain tribes of the interior, although success remained limited. Better success occurred in the south, where the Spanish gained control over the seas and coasts, and obtained the surrender of the Sultanate of Sulu in 1878.

=== National awakening and revolution ===
The Latin American wars of independence and renewed immigration led to shifts in social identity, with the term Filipino shifting from referring to Spaniards born in the Iberian Peninsula and in the Philippines to a term encompassing all people in the archipelago. This identity shift was driven by wealthy families of mixed ancestry, for which it developed into a national identity, and served as a claim to status equal to Spanish peninsulares and insulares. Spanish served as a common language for the growing local elite, who shared a Western educational background despite varied ethnolinguistic origins. Most came from Manila. A class of educated individuals became known as the Ilustrados. This group included individuals who had studied at both local universities and Spanish ones, and came from a variety of socioeconomic backgrounds. They gained prominence in Philippine administration, and became increasingly involved in politics. This added a third group of elites to the two existing groups of the urban bureaucracy and the municipal elites.

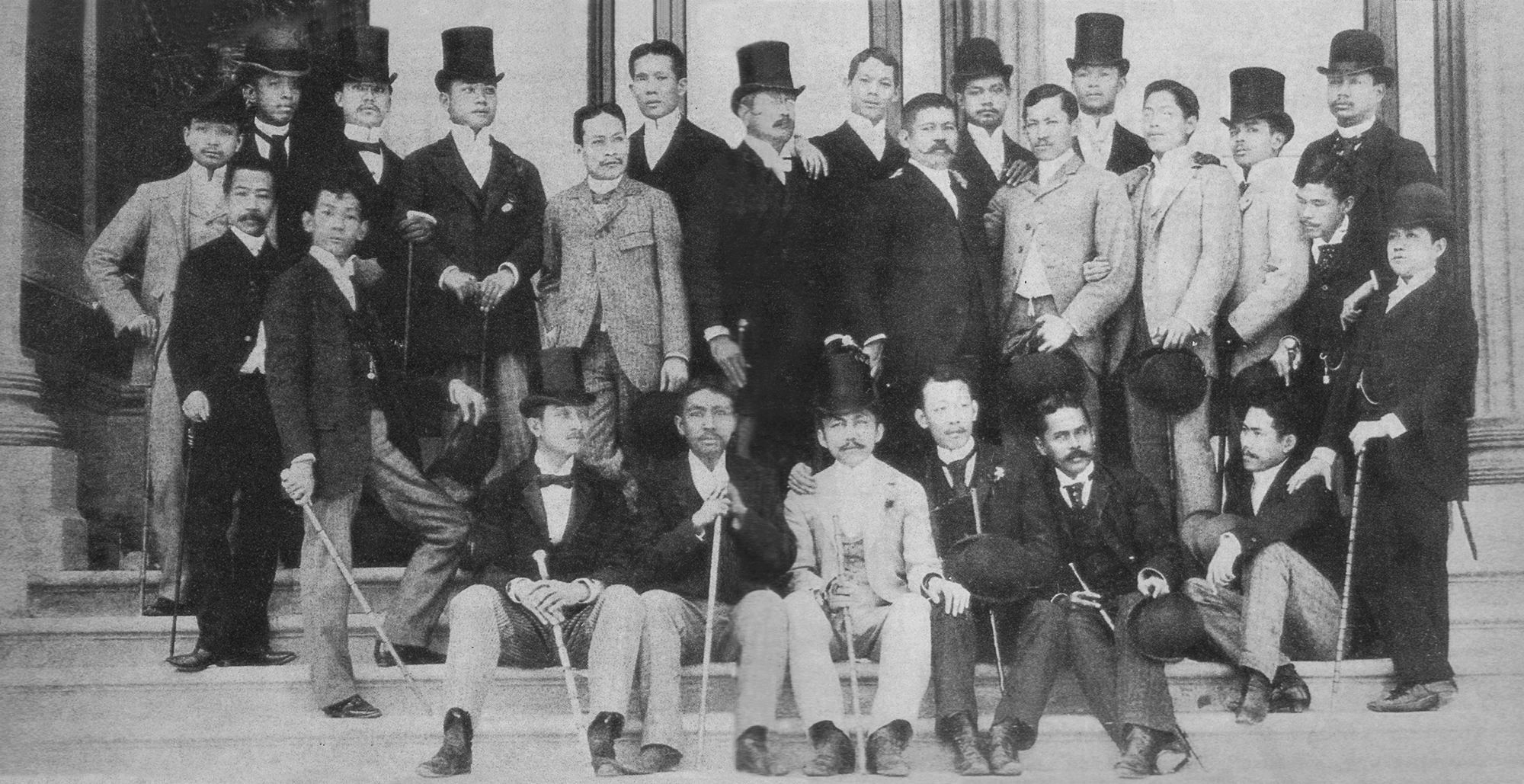
The Ilustrados in Madrid

Liberal reforms and ideas that had taken root in Spain were resisted by the conservative religious orders that had influence throughout the Philippines. In the 1880s, some prominent Ilustrados, especially those who had studied in Spain, launched the Propaganda Movement. This loose movement sought to reform Spanish administration of the Philippines. The restoration of Philippine representation to the Cortes was one of the grievances raised by the Ilustrados. For the most part it was a campaign for secular self-government as a full part of Spain, as well as equality between those born in Spain and those born in the Philippines. Much of the campaigning took place in Madrid rather than in the Philippines. With liberal reforms rejected, some saw the movement as the beginning of a national awakening, as its members began to return to the Philippines. A small change occurred in 1893, when Spain passed the Maura Law, providing a limited measure of local autonomy.

An authoritarian backlash against the Propaganda Movement led to official suppression. In the 1890s divisions emerged among those that supported the ideals of the movement. One group that emerged from this was the Katipunan, created in 1892 predominantly by members of Manila's urban middle class rather than by Ilustrados. These individuals were often less wealthy than those who made up the Ilustrados, and less invested in the existing political structures. The Katipunan advocated complete Philippine independence, and began the Philippine Revolution in 1896. This revolution gained the support of the municipal elite outside of the major cities, who found themselves with significantly greater control as Spanish administrative and religious authorities were forced out by the revolutionaries.

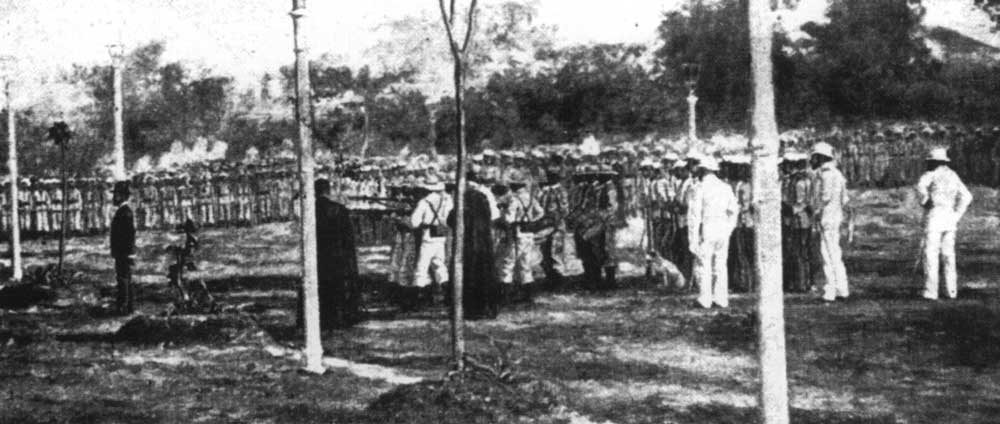
The execution of José Rizal exacerbated the rebellion against Spain.

Despite most Ilustrados opposing the revolution, many were implicated by the Spanish authorities and were arrested and imprisoned. After the execution of José Rizal on December 30, 1896, the leader of the Ilustrados who disapproved of the revolution, the rebellion intensified. The Katipunan in Cavite had won several battles against the Spaniards, but was split into the Magdiwang and Magdalo factions. A conference was held in 1897 to unite the two factions, but instead caused further division that led to the execution of Andres Bonifacio, who was then the leader of the Katipunan; Bonifacio's death passed the control of the Katipunan to Emilio Aguinaldo. This was part of a shift from middle class to elite leadership within the rebellion. Nonetheless, Spanish military superiority was unable to overcome growing political support for the revolution that emerged outside of Manila throughout the archipelago. A provisional constitution was set up to last two years, but was soon superseded by an agreement between the Spaniards and the revolutionaries, the Pact of Biak-na-Bato. This pact provided for Aguinaldo's surrender and exile to Hong Kong, and amnesty and payment of indemnities by the Spaniards to the revolutionaries. However, both sides eventually violated the agreement.

The Spanish–American War reached the Philippines on May 1 with the Battle of Manila Bay. Aguinaldo returned from exile, set up a new government, and proclaimed the independence of the Philippines on June 12, 1898, in Kawit, Cavite. Aguilnaldo gained support even from Ilustrados who had opposed the initial revolution. War with the Americans prompted the Spanish Governor to offer an autonomous government, however the Americans defeated the Spanish on August 13 in a mock battle in Manila and took control of the city. Aguinaldo proclaimed a revolutionary government, and convened a congress on September 15, 1898, in Barasoain Church in Malolos. This unicameral congress was aimed at enticing support to the revolutionaries. It approved the declaration of independence, and in 1899 approved the Malolos Constitution to inaugurate the First Philippine Republic. The First Philippine Republic reflected the liberal ideas of the time, valuing private property rights and limiting voting to high-class men, reflecting the growing influence of the elite in the initially anti-elite movement. Discussions about this first constitution saw calls from the Visayas for federalism. However, this idea was not included in the final constitution, and the constitutional questions were overtaken by centralizing forces and military events. On December 10, 1898, Spain ceded sovereignty of the Philippines to the United States in the Treaty of Paris that ended the short war between those powers.

== American era ==
=== Conquest and consolidation ===
The Philippine–American War erupted in February 1899 with a skirmish in Manila. The United States set up military and civil governments in the capital and other areas as they were pacified. Just nine days after the conquest of Manila, civil administration was initiated with the involvement of local Ilustrados. In rural areas, the co-opting of municipal elites that had taken over from the Spanish removed resistance to American rule. Aguinaldo was captured on April 1, 1901, at Palanan, Isabela. While they rejected proposals for a federal system or autonomy in favor of a more easily controlled centralized system, the Americans gave Filipinos limited self-government at the local level by 1901, holding the first municipal elections, and passed the Philippine Organic Act in 1902 to introduce a national government and regularize civilian rule, designating the Philippine Commission as a legislative body, with membership consisting of Americans appointed by the U.S. president. The first provincial elections took place in 1902. The judicial system saw Cayetano Arellano appointed as the first Filipino Chief Justice of the Supreme Court. The judicial system as a whole was modelled the American system, and American judges shaped early case law.

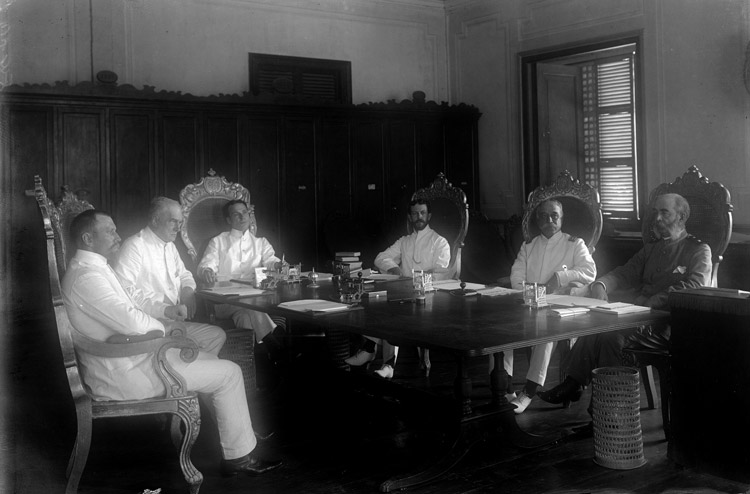
Following the end of the Spanish–American War, the Schurman Commission was tasked with assessing the situation in the Philippines by United States President William McKinley.

U.S. President Theodore Roosevelt ended U.S. hostilities and proclaimed a full and complete pardon and amnesty to revolutionaries on July 4, 1902, and abolished the office of U.S. Military Governor in the Philippines. On April 9, 2002, Philippine President Gloria Macapagal Arroyo proclaimed that the Philippine–American War had ended on April 16, 1902, with the surrender of General Miguel Malvar.

American belief in the importance of the rule of law defined its political approach to the Philippines, with its laws and constitutional traditions replicated in their new possessions and applying to Americans and natives alike. It also served as a justification for taking possession of the islands, along with the theory they were as of yet incapable of democratic self-governance. The Schurman Commission, in assessing the islands, reported to the President that the various peoples of the islands lacked a common nationhood. However, a small number of elites, such as those who led the independence movement, were considered "highly-educated and able". Those with wealth and education were considered more likely to acquiesce to American rule compared to those in the middle class.

This elite minority was seen as the key to gaining acceptance of American rule, and the Americans appropriated selected narratives such as the veneration of José Rizal. The hierarchical social structure that existed under Spanish rule was co-opted by the United States, with democracy introduced in a manner which did not threaten the power of the existing elites. Actions which included Filipinos within government structures were taken as demonstrations of American commitment to local involvement in governance. The elites further benefited from the redistribution of friar lands. In turn, ilustrado views of Filipino society influenced the Americans. Initial American policy favored local governance, and so they introduced elections at a local level and later built upwards. This had the effect of entrenching local elites into the national system, who were often relied upon to help govern by the American administration. This process meant that politicians who built provincial power bases in these early years were able to compete at a national level with politicians from Manila. In some rural areas, support for the revolution and opposition to American rule persisted among the poorer population, which would later shift into support for socialist ideas and conflict with both American and elite rule. However, the Anti-Sedition Law of 1901 limited the early development of these political ideas.

American forces continued to secure and extend their control over the islands, suppressing an attempted extension of the Philippine Republic, securing the Sultanate of Sulu, and establishing control over interior mountainous areas that had resisted Spanish conquest. The last military resistance outside of Mindanao was ended by 1906. Military rule over the Muslim Moro Province and the animist Mountain Province ended in 1913, with them then coming under the control of the civilian government in Manila. This wove southern Mindanao into the country more tightly that it had ever been previously, although its inhabitants remained a distinct minority. Divisions between Christians and Muslims (known as Moros) in the archipelago coincided with American economic interest in Mindanao. American proposals to split most of Mindanao, the Sulu archipelago, and Palawan from the rest of the islands were supported by some Moro political leaders. Some Moro leaders believed all of Mindanao to be rightfully theirs, in spite of a large Christian minority. Moros remained concerned that rule by Americans would be replaced with rule by Christian Filipinos. Proposals to divide the colony were strongly opposed by the predominantly Christian Philippine legislature. The Bureau of Non-Christian Tribes was created in 1920, replacing direct rule by an American Governor, and the Philippine government pursued a policy of gradually strengthening government in Mindanao, supported by immigration from Christian areas. By 1935 these areas were fully integrated into the Philippine administrative structure. Despite this, the traditional political structures of Sultanates and Datus continued as a parallel structure in Mindanao and Sulu throughout the American period, and beyond.

=== Development of political institutions ===
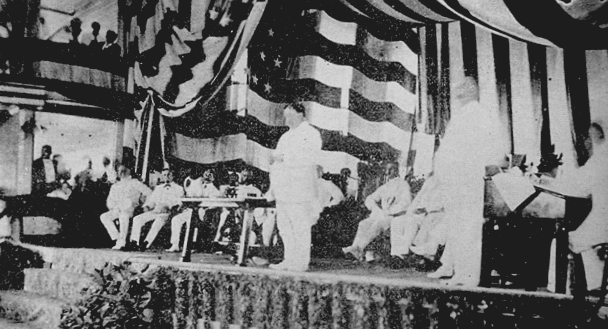
William Howard Taft, who served as Governor-General of the Philippines from 1901 to 1903, addressing the opening of the Philippine Assembly in 1907

Americans expanded local participation in governance beyond that which had been allowed under Spanish rule, expanding representative government beyond the merely advisory system that existed under the Spanish. Political participation remained limited by pre-existing criteria on status and wealth, with the addition of literacy as another consideration. The Federalist Party, formed in 1900 by landed elites, advocated for autonomy under American rule, although its leaders hoped to become a state of the United States. These individuals were considered traitors by the ongoing Philippine revolution, but their alliance with the American military led members of the party to be placed in positions of power at all levels and branches of government. Opposition began to consolidate under the banner of the Nacionalista Party, which advocated for independence and regarded itself as the heir of the First Philippine Republic. On July 30, 1907, the first election of the Philippine Assembly was held. Led by Sergio Osmeña, the assembly was held predominantly by the Nacionalista Party; they were opposed by the Federalists, who were by then renamed the Progresista Party. The Nacionalistas ended up with a majority of 80 seats. Due to the tight restrictions of the voting franchise, only 1.4% of the population participated in this election. The Nacionalista party would maintain electoral dominance until independence, and even came to include several former Federalistas.

Legislation involving immigration, currency and coinage, and timber and mining required approval by the United States President. Despite their ambitions for independence, Nacionalista leaders developed collaborative relationships with American officials. The election of United States President Woodrow Wilson, and his appointment of Governor-General Francis Burton Harrison, led to the policy of Filipinization being introduced in 1913 as part of a policy to accelerate decolonization. In 1913 Filipinos were included in the commission, shifting its membership to five Filipinos and four Americans. Efforts were also made to bring locals into the civil service.

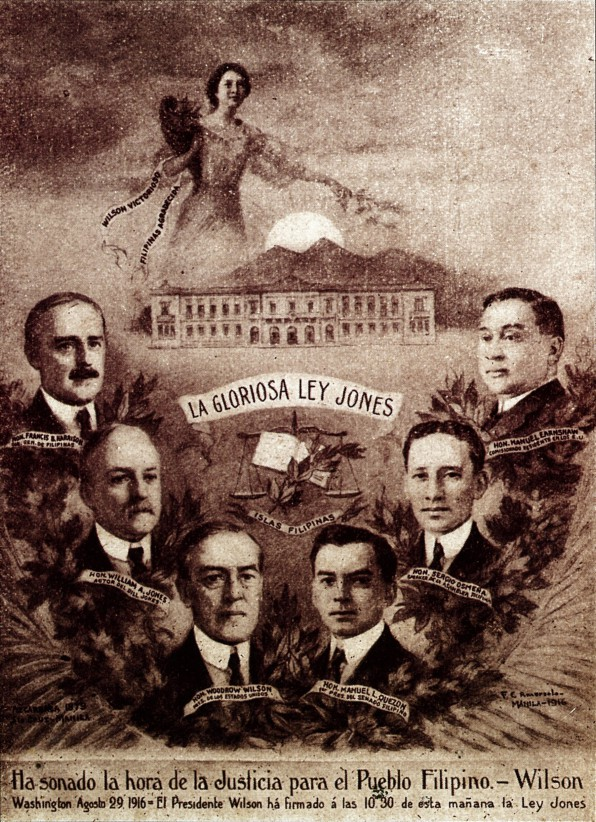
The 1916 Jones Law envisioned eventual independence for the Philippines.

The commission was replaced by the Philippine Senate through the 1916 Jones Law. This body had 24 members elected for six-year terms, with two from each of the 12 senatorial districts. Most were elected; however those from the district consisting of the non-Christian areas of Mindanao and the Cordilleras were appointed by the Governor-General. The appointed senators had no fixed terms. This legislative body had the power to confirm appointments to the executive and judicial branches. The Jones Law envisioned eventual Philippine independence, once the territory had achieved stable governance. Some American legislators continued to disagree with this aim, believing American rule could be indefinite. 1916 also saw the voting franchise expand from just educated English and Spanish speakers to include educated speakers of native languages, and the removal of the requirement to own property, leading to the electorate including 6–7% of the population. By 1921, the Filipinization policy had resulted in 96% of the civil service staff being Filipinos.

The Nacionalista-dominated Philippine Assembly, and later the Philippine Senate, were often at odds with the Governor-General. Its leadership grew more powerful, seizing state bodies and using nationalism to weaken American oversight. The establishment of the senate led to the Nacionalistas forming opposing camps loyal to Osmeña (the Unipersonalistas), Senate President Manuel L. Quezon (the Colectavistas) and House Speaker Manuel Roxas (Liberals). Despite this division, several independence missions were sent to Washington, D.C. The fallout of a dispute with Governor-General Leonard Wood in 1923 led to American congressional support for independence in 1924, but there was no agreement between Philippine politicians advocating for immediate and complete independence and those who would prefer transition through Commonwealth status. The onset of the Great Depression strengthened American desire to grant independence to the Philippines, as it would reduce American liability to the territory. The OsRox Mission led by Osmeña and House Speaker Roxas resulted in the Hare–Hawes–Cutting Act. However, the Senate rejected this; a new law, the Tydings–McDuffie Act which was marginally different and, more importantly, was supported by Quezon, was approved and paved the way for the Commonwealth of the Philippines and mandated U.S. recognition of independence of the Philippine Islands after a ten-year transition period.

The institutionalization of the elite's role in politics under the American system, combined with an increase in the Philippine population and an accruing of land into elite hands, led to a breakdown in transitional social relationships between the elite and the rest of the populace. In rural areas, especially central Luzon, class consciousness-based political organization developed, leading to eventually to peasant revolts in the 1930s.

== Commonwealth era ==
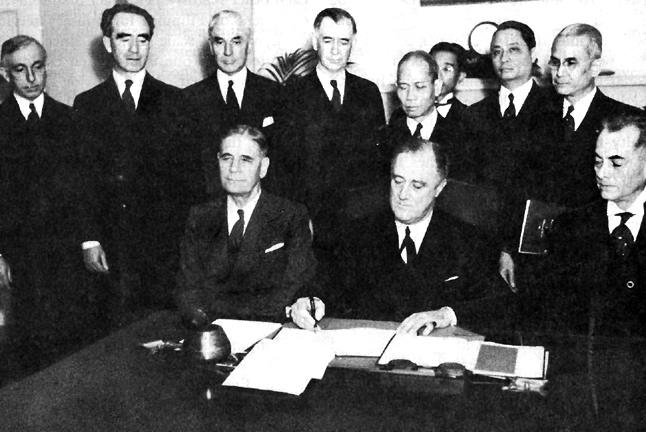
United States President Franklin D. Roosevelt signs the 1935 Constitution of the Philippines in the presence of then Philippine Senate President Manuel L. Quezon.

The new constitution created under this act was approved on January 31, 1935, and was adopted the next day. The first elections were held on September 17. Quezon and Osmeña reconciled, and both were elected as president and vice president, respectively, in 1935. The Nacionalistas controlled the now unicameral National Assembly for the entirety of the Commonwealth, with the understanding that the Americans would grant independence in the near future. In 1937 the voting franchise was expanded to include literate women, and this period saw participation in elections reach 14%. Local elections were held in different years to legislative and presidential elections. Under the Commonwealth religious freedom was guaranteed, although government and national identity remained Christian and Manila-centric. A national curriculum similarly sought to impose a single vision of a Filipino identity across the diverse ethnolinguistic groups of the islands. Alongside this, Tagalog was established as a national language.

The Presidential system of the Commonwealth government was based on that of the United States. However, while dividing power between three branches similarly with the constitution of the United States, the 1935 constitution gave the Philippine President significantly more power both politically and economically than that accorded to the President of the United States. Tensions between the executive and legislature, especially over passing budgets, were immediately apparent under the new system. Control over budgets and political appointments were the two biggest ways that the legislature could influence the executive. Budgetary control also provided members of Congress of means to generate political patronage through pork barrel politics. Seats in the legislature provided valuable access to the Philippine National Bank, and the ability to influence export quotas (most valuably that of sugar). Often one family member became involved in politics, while another managed the family business.

Having sought the restriction of executive power under American Governors, as President Quezon now moved to expand its power. The peasant-led Sakdal uprising and the fear of a newly formed communist party were used to justify centralizing power. Originally a unicameral legislature was created, however Quezon pressed for constitutional amendments that would allow him to obtain a second term and for the restoration of a bicameral legislature. Both amendments were passed, with the newly restored Senate now being elected at-large instead of per district, as what was done during the pre-Commonwealth era. Quezon, Osmeña, and the Nacionalista Party as a whole won the elections in 1941 with greatly increased margins. Through patronage, Quezon was able to maintain strong support among local elites. This clout allowed him to pass several significant reforms aimed at improving the economic situation of the poor and middle classes, failing only in his attempts at land reform.

The transition to the Commonwealth government from American rule led to civil service positions that had previously been held by Americans being filled by political appointees, a practice explicitly allowed by the 1935 constitution. The constitution also served to protect American interests in the Philippines, effectively giving them greater economic access than other foreign countries, and the Philippine economy remained tied to the American one even after independence. Defence and foreign affairs remained under the control of the United States, while legislation and judicial decisions could be reviewed in the United States. Treatment of the Commonwealth by the United States was inconsistent, with it sometimes being treated as a separate country and sometimes being treated as under United States jurisdiction. Nonetheless, internationally they had gained some acceptance as a distinct country. The Philippines already had membership within the Universal Postal Union, which was continued by the Commonwealth. After World War II, the Commonwealth became a founding member of the International Monetary Fund, the World Bank, the International Civil Aviation Organization, the Food and Agriculture Organization, and the United Nations.

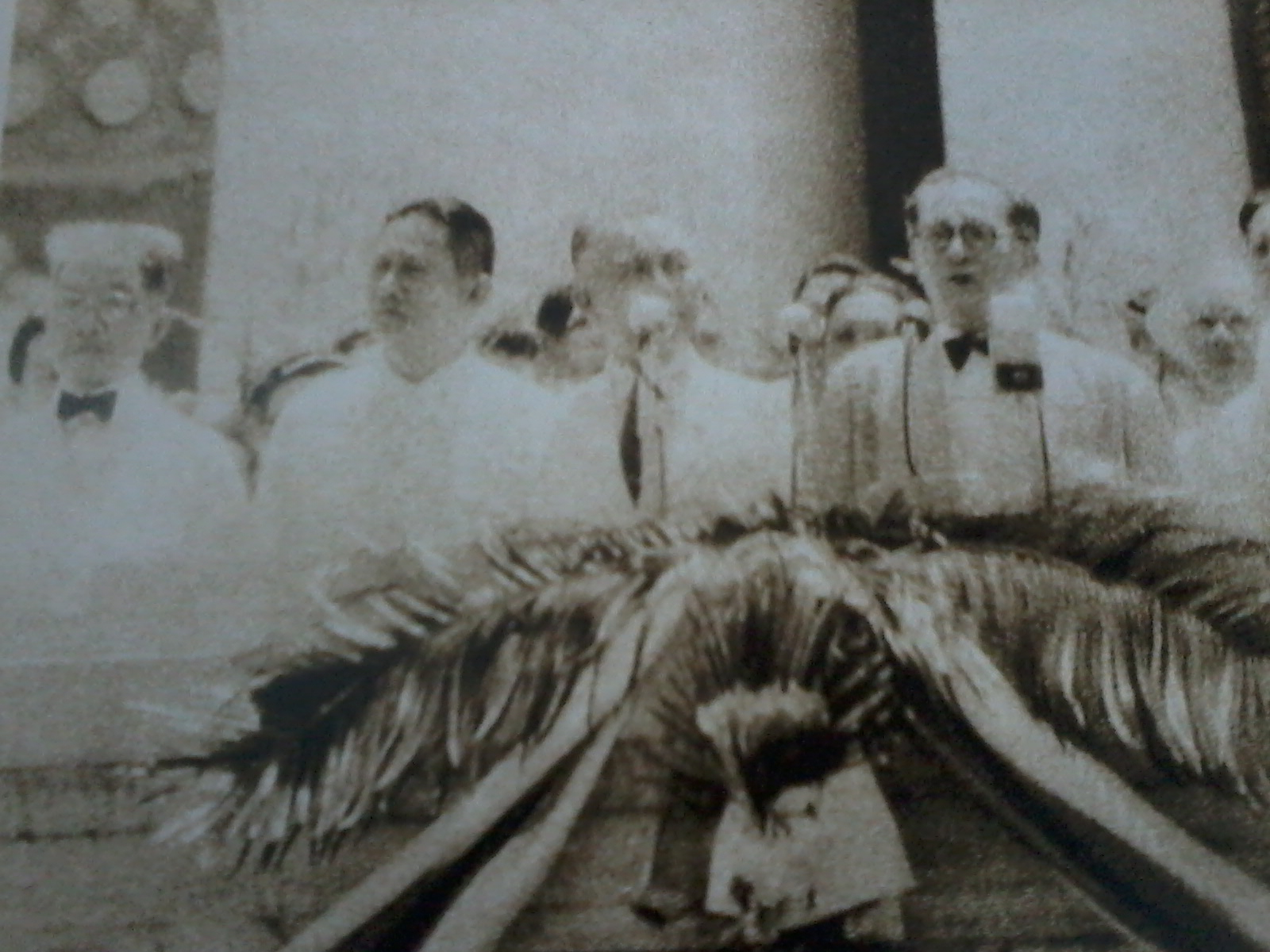
The inauguration of Jose P. Laurel as President of the Second Philippine Republic during the Japanese occupation of the Philippines

The Japanese invasion of 1941 at the onset of World War II forced the Commonwealth government to go into exile, and subjected the country to a puppet government. All existing political parties merged into the KALIBAPI party, created by Proclamation No. 109 on December 8, 1942. KALIBAPI became the sole legal political party, and Jose P. Laurel was declared president of an independent Second Philippine Republic on October 14, 1943. Some municipal and tax laws from the 1935 Constitution remained in force during this period, and there was continuity in state bureaucracy from the Commonwealth to the Second Republic. Under Japanese rule, governing policy was to win the populace over to the Japanese cause and thus reduce support for the United States, but this was unsuccessful. In rural areas, a sudden vacuum of elite power led to the formation of new local governments by the remaining populace, beginning the Hukbalahap Rebellion. Exiled leaders of the previous first Commonwealth government provided limited support to the U.S.; President President Quezon was a member of the Pacific War Council and participated, along with Vice President Osmeña and members of his cabinet, in civic and social activities, promoting the sale of war bonds, etc.

The Americans reconquered the country in 1944, and Osmeña, who had succeeded Quezon upon the latter's death, restored the Commonwealth government. Those attending the congress were the remaining living and free members of the 1941 congress. The Nacionalistas were divided following the war, with a leadership struggle leading to Manuel Roxas setting up what would later be the Liberal Party. Roxas defeated Osmeña in the 1946 presidential election, and became the last president of the Commonwealth. A left-wing political movement that spawned from the Hukbalahap fight against the Japanese was suppressed by the former elite with American support, leading to the continuation of the rebellion against the new government. The Americans granted independence on July 4, 1946, and Roxas became the first president of the new Republic of the Philippines. The 1935 Commonwealth constitution continued in effect, as did existing membership in international organizations.

== Two-party system ==
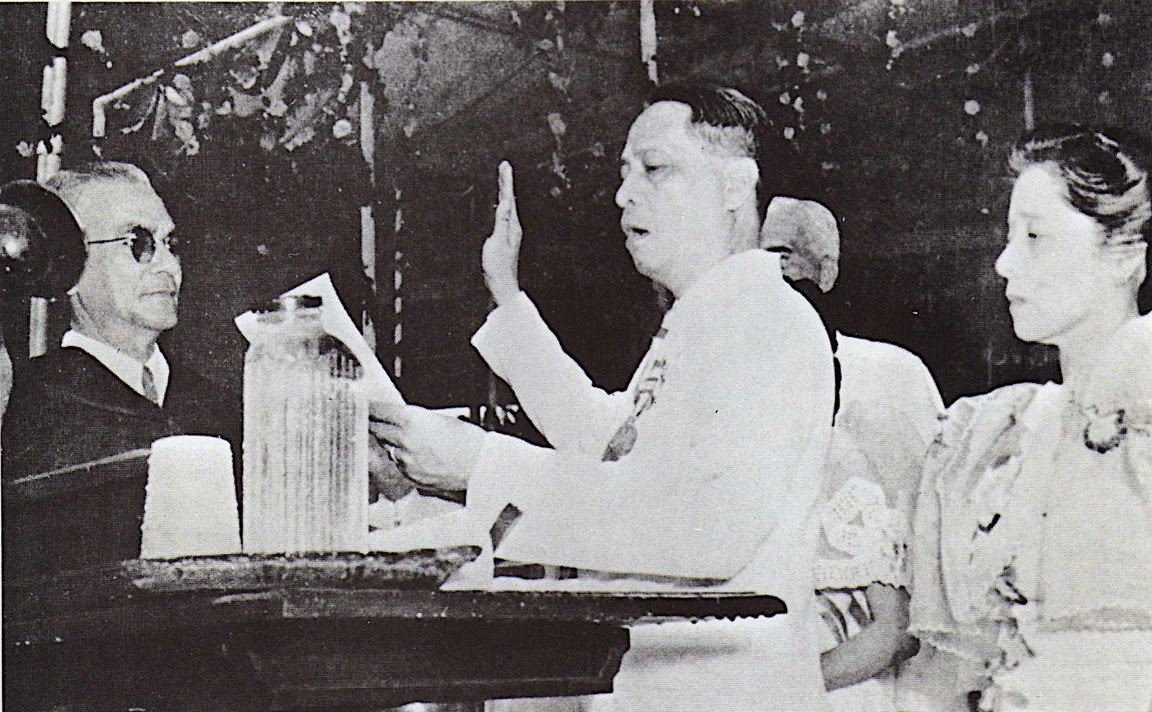
President Manuel Roxas' inauguration as the first president of an independent Philippines

The impact of the war led to a weaker civil service and a reduction in the dominance of Manila, with provincial politicians gaining political power and in some cases de facto autonomy. Many leveraged their provincial power to engage in national politics. Muslim leaders who had resisted Japanese occupation were rewarded with local political office, and others successfully ran for Congress. Eventually, many throughout the country who had collaborated with the Japanese were pardoned in 1948 and 1953. Universal suffrage saw an expansion of voter participation, although power remained concentrated in the hands of a small elite. Despite the landed elite continuing to dominate the legislature, a diversifying post-war economy saw politicians who were not primarily from agricultural backgrounds come to executive power. By the late 1960s this had largely brought an end to the land-based cacique democracy patronage system. Political offices became lucrative by themselves, and patronage became more reliant on access to government funds. Continued American economic and military support lessened the dependence of the executive on the legislature. These changes did not shift the overall shape of Filipino politics, which remained a two-party system dominated by a narrow elite. The winner of the Presidency tended to also take control of both houses of Congress. There was little policy difference between the two parties, and defections were common. Patronage, fraud, and voter suppression were common methods of maintaining power.

Roxas succumbed to a heart attack in 1948, allowing Vice President Elpidio Quirino to rule the country for the next six years, after winning in 1949. The continuing threat of the Hukbalahap led Defence Secretary Ramon Magsaysay to use the military to guard polling stations in the 1951 Senate election, an election which was as a result considered quite fair. During his term in office, Quirino sought to significantly expand executive power. Election concerns led to the National Citizens' Movement for Free Elections being formed, an early example of civil society organization that prominently included World War II veterans. This movement was supported by the United States, who desired the Philippines to be an example of democracy as the Cold War reached Asia, and by the Catholic Church. Quirino's Liberal government was widely seen as corrupt and was easily beaten by Ramon Magsaysay in the 1953 election. Magsaysay, who oversaw the surrender of the Hukbalahap, was massively popular. Magsaysay implemented a plan to settle surrendered Hukbalahap rebels in Mindanao. This cemented a demographic shift in Mindanao from having a Muslim majority to having a Christian majority. The expression of class-based politics shifted towards more moderate groups, such as the Federation of Free Farmers and the Federation of Free Workers. During his rule, Magsaysay also expanded the role of the military in his administration, believing them to be reliable.

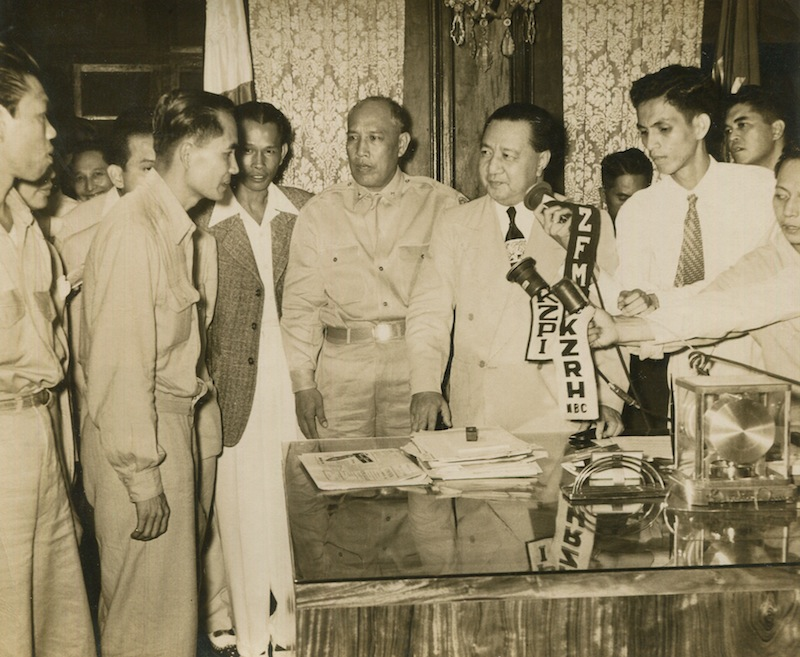
President Elpidio Quirino meets leaders of the Hukbalahap Rebellion.

Before the 1957 election, Magsaysay was killed in a plane crash. His vice president, Carlos P. Garcia, succeeded him and won the election. The military distrusted Garcia, but plans to remove him from office never reached fruition. The removal of many officers from the administration, to be replaced by often corrupt civilians, fermented a distrust of the democratic process within some parts of the military. Garcia continued Magsaysay's "Filipino First" policy and implemented an austerity program. Garcia was defeated by his vice president, Diosdado Macapagal of the Liberal Party, in 1961. Macapagal initiated a return to a system of free enterprise, and sought land reform and electrification. However, Macapagal's policies faced stiff opposition in Congress, where the Nacionalistas held the majority. The Philippine civil service in the late 1950s and 60s was becoming more technocratic, and Macapagal established the Program Implementation Agency directly under the President. This body was used to manage projects relatively free from Congressional oversight. Macapagal was defeated in 1965 by Senator Ferdinand Marcos.

The growing and diversifying economy of the 1960s led to a growth in private business power and an expansion in mass media. Marcos' infrastructure projects were the feature policy of his term, he was the first president to be re-elected, in 1969, although the election was tainted by violence and allegations of fraud and vote buying. The 1969 election saw a similar election observation effort to 1953, although it did not receive as much backing or have as much impact. Marcos was not opposed by the church, business, or the United States. Significant protests, such as the First Quarter Storm, and civil unrest heightened after the election. While Marcos initially distrusted the military, who were suspected of planning a coup following successful coups elsewhere in Asia, he eventually co-opted the military into his re-election campaign, and began to heavily rely on the military during his second term. Communist rebellion strengthened during Marcos' rule, and a Moro insurgency emerged in Mindanao as tensions surrounding Christian immigration combined with a more empowered national government. Local elections in 1971 overturned Muslim political dominance in Mindanao, as Christian settlers who had previously voted for traditional Muslim leaders switched to voting for Christian representatives.

== Marcos dictatorship ==
Despite initiating a constitutional convention in 1971, Marcos declared martial law in 1972. While this was likely to justify arresting political opponents, Marcos cited the communist insurgency and Muslim separatism as the reasons for the move. At one point, communist rebels were present in one fifth of the country's villages. Meanwhile, the imposition of military rule only increased Muslim resistance in Mindanao. Attempts to end the war in Mindanao led Marcos to alter the political situation in the area. He introduced a code of Muslim personal laws, and formally recognized a number of sultans in Mindanao and Sulu. Negotiations led the insurgency to replace demands for independence with demands for autonomy. While peace talks ultimately failed, the level of violence subsided from its peak in the early 1970s.

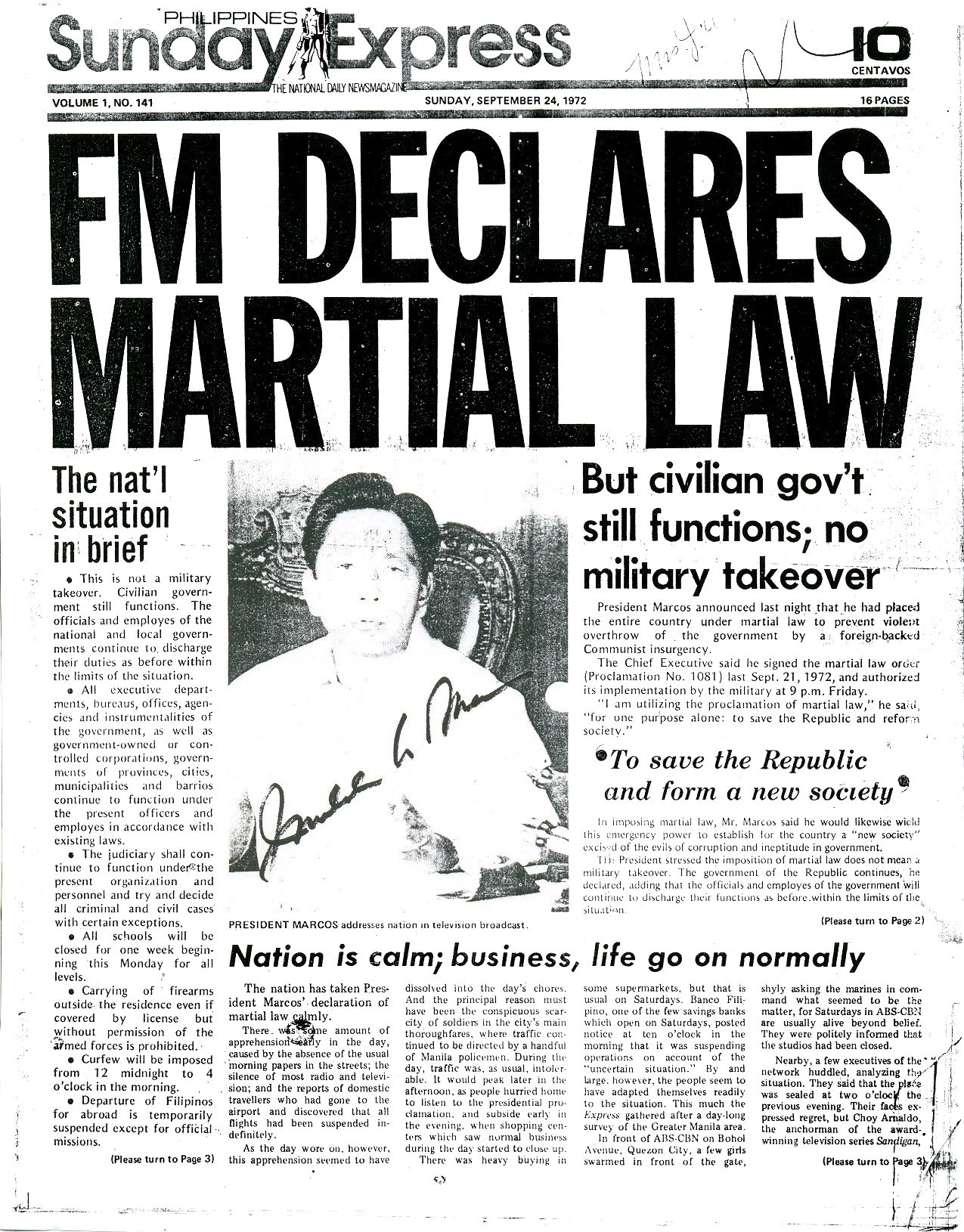
President Ferdinand Marcos declares martial law.

Marcos framed his government as fighting against the rich landed elite that traditionally dominated politics. He relied on the growing technocratic civil service, who were receptive to such arguments, to effectively run the country under martial law. The first large-scale government reorganization since independence shortly followed, including a purge of the existing civil service. Marcos also relied on the military, which gained increased power and resources during the martial law period. By the end of the Marcos' rule, it had quadrupled in size. Much of this was funded through U.S. military assistance, which doubled during this period. Military training also shifted, with an increasing emphasis on humanities, in order to allow officers to more effectively handle civilian administrative roles.

The convention finalized the new constitution in November 1972. It called for a semi-presidential government was approved in 1973 through shows of hands in citizen assemblies, a process that did not meet the requirements of the 1935 constitution for constitutional change. The Supreme Court ruled that although this procedure was improper, the constitution had come into force. "Amendment No. 6" of 1976 gave the executive the law-making powers of the legislature. Beginning with these referendums, the voting age was lowered from 21 to 15.

In a 1974 Presidential Decree, the barrio subdivisions were renamed barangays. The Integrated National Police was formed in 1975, extending national control of policing to the local level. Marcos continued to rule by decree without elections until 1978, when the Interim Batasang Pambansa (IBP) legislature was elected. Marcos had complete control over the bureaucracy, local governments, military, the press, and COMELEC. The 1978 parliamentary and the 1980 local elections were dominated by Marcos' Kilusang Bagong Lipunan party. The unicameral IBP had little power, unable to repeal Presidential decrees or declare no confidence in the government. The Supreme Court affirmed the expansive executive powers claimed under martial law.

Marcos laid out a vision of a "new society", which would represent an end to old oligarchies. The changes implemented by Marcos sought to eliminate regional power centers and instead strengthen links between his national government and the general public. This was only partially successful, and Marcos relied on local allies to enforce martial law. Some political dynasties who were not allied with Marcos were stripped of assets and power, in many cases replaced in local politics by Marcos allies. Marcos ended martial law in 1981, shortly before a visit to the country by Pope John Paul II, although he retained immense executive powers. Opposition groups still boycotted the 1981 presidential election, which Marcos easily won while maintaining tight control of the election process. As martial law was repealed Marcos implemented a system of nominal autonomy in some regions of Mindanao. This was, however, seen as largely toothless, and the Moro Islamic Liberation Front operated as a shadow government in some areas.

Opponents to Marcos were able to consolidate under the United Nationalist Democratic Organization. Opposition leader Benigno Aquino Jr. was assassinated upon his return to the country in 1983. By this time, the government was marred by a weak economy, rampant corruption, and a loss of political support. A united opposition participated in the 1984 parliamentary election, and made gains including defections from the ruling party. Meanwhile, the economy had entered a period of contraction. Divisions within the military emerged during this period. As elements of the military became more involved in governing, including abetting Marcos in increasing his control, morale decreased among those continuing to fight the rebellion. As crisis deepened, some officers began to believe the survival of the political system required the removal of Marcos.

In 1985, to counter growing opposition, Marcos called for a snap election that had no constitutional basis. The opposition nominated Benigno's widow Corazon as their candidate. Marcos was declared the winner of the 1986 election, but the opposition refused to accept the result, alleging that the election was rigged. This opposition included disaffected members of the military, who when their plans for a coup after the election were disrupted, instead declared support for Aquino. The resulting People Power Revolution drove Marcos from power, and Aquino became president following Congress officially declaring her the election winner.

== Post–People Power era ==
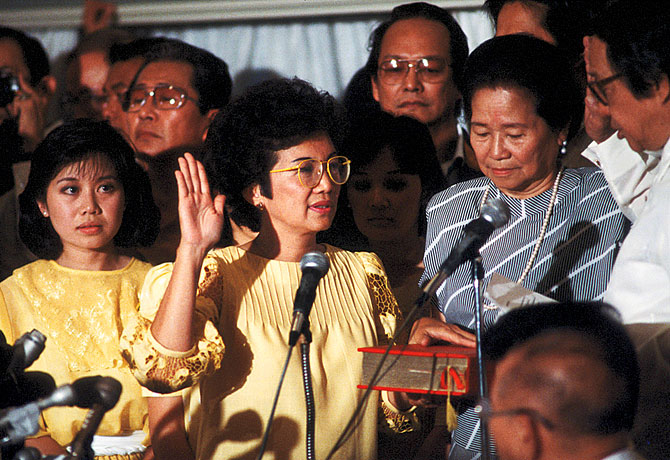
Corazon Aquino was inaugurated president on February 25, 1986; it was one of two presidential inaugurations that day.

Initially Aquino governed under a "freedom constitution", while setting up a constitutional commission to replace the 1973 constitution. This "freedom constitution" declared the Aquino Government to have been installed through a direct exercise of the power of the Filipino people assisted by units of the New Armed Forces of the Philippines. The military's perceived role in this overthrowing of President Marcos created a precedent for direct intervention into politics. With the IBP abolished, Aquino exercised both executive and legislative powers. This power was used to modify the Family Code to increase gender equality.

The 1987 constitution, approved via plebiscite, restored democracy along the lines of the 1935 constitution, although local elections became synchronized with national elections, term limits were put in place, and a multi-party system replaced the previous two-party system. Checks and balances were put in place to limit executive power, and many laws established during martial law were repealed. The Senate was re-created, and active members of the military were barred from government. Written in the aftermath of the people power movement, the new constitution introduced some elements of direct democracy, such as the possibility of constitutional amendments though "initiative and referendum", recall of local elected officials, and provisions guaranteeing the right for civil society groups to organize.

The new constitution did not cancel the effect of the previous one, and unless otherwise stated laws established under the 1973 constitution remained in effect. Economic property that had been expropriated from elite families under the dictatorship was returned to them. The 1987 constitution kept the 1973 text on civilian rule over the military, although it added that the armed forces were the "protector of the people and the state". It also separated the Philippine Constabulary from the military, while shifting response for internal security from the military to the police. The military as a whole had mostly voted against the new constitution, and three coups were attempted between July 1986 and August 1987. The practice of recruiting retired military officers for some executive branch roles, such as ambassadorships, or within cabinet, that was started by Marcos and continued after the restoration of democracy. The separation between the police and the military was impeded by the continuing communist and Islamic rebellions.

The 1987 legislative election, which saw elections for all 24 Senate seats instead of the usual 12, saw pro-Aquino parties win most of the seats in Congress. The electoral system meant that the 200 members of the House had together received only 34% of votes. While local officials were initially appointed directly by Aquino, divisions in left-leaning groups who had opposed Marcos, and a related lack of participation in the 1988 local elections, contributed to the traditional elite recapturing elected office. Political reform movements that had grown under Marcos and played a significant role in the revolution lost their strength over the next few years. Aquino's government was mired by coup attempts, high inflation and unemployment, and natural calamities, but introduced limited land reform and market liberalization. Communist rebels, who had broken with other anti-Marcos groups, continued a low-intensity rebellion. Islamic separatists similarly continued their campaign in the south. Although there were some initial peace negotiations which saw limited success, Aquino eventually undertook a "total war" policy against these insurrections. The establishment of the Autonomous Region in Muslim Mindanao (ARMM) saw little change on the ground. Aquino's administration also saw the pullout of the U.S. bases in Subic Bay and Clark. In 1991, a new Local Government Code shifted some power and resources to lower levels of government.

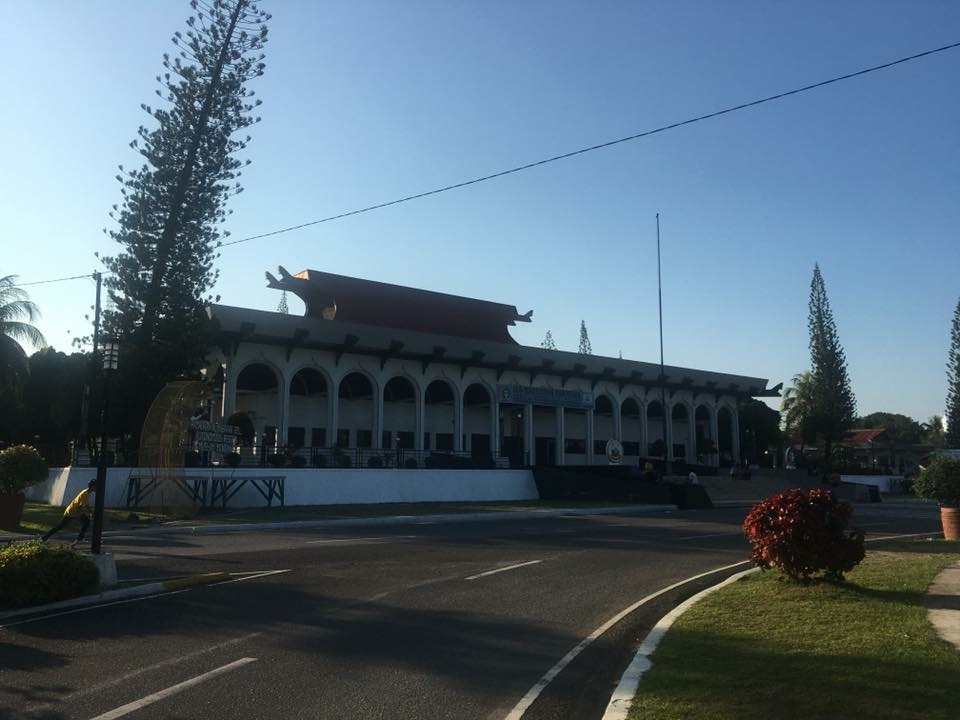
The Office of the Regional Governor building held the government of the Autonomous Region in Muslim Mindanao.

Aquino did not wish to run for re-election, and leading up to the 1992 presidential election she supported Fidel V. Ramos, who had left her party to form his own, rather than the nominated leader of her party, Ramon Mitra Jr.. Ramos won, albeit under controversial circumstances and allegations of electoral fraud. The 1992 elections was the first synchronized election, where presidential, legislative, and local elections were held simultaneously. This election also saw 24 senators elected, with the twelve with the lowest votes being elected only for three years. Following this election, the system of 12 senators being elected for six-year terms every three years began. Ramos, facing an ongoing energy crisis inherited from the Aquino administration, resolved the issue by issuing contracts favorable to power producers. The Ramos administration privatized government monopolies, lowered economic regulation, hosted the 1996 APEC summit, reinstated the death penalty, signed the party list system act, repealed the anti-subversion law, devolved power away from the national government through the Local Government Code, signed a peace agreement with the Moro National Liberation Front, and bore the brunt of the 1997 Asian financial crisis. While Ramos actively cooperated with civil society groups, his social reform agenda did not bring about serious reform. He was unable to fulfil his desire to amend the constitution, following opposition from Aquino and other sectors.

With the Asian financial crisis damaging the image of economy liberalism, and with no clear successor to Ramos, Ramos' vice president Joseph Estrada defeated the former's party mate Jose de Venecia and several others in the 1998 election with a comfortable margin, running a populist campaign that appealed directly to poorer voters. Meanwhile, de Venecia's running mate Gloria Macapagal Arroyo was elected vice president. Estrada wanted to amend the constitution to reduce economic protectionism, but was opposed by Aquino and the Catholic Church. The administration launched an "all-out war" against the Moro Islamic Liberation Front that saw the government retaking Camp Abubakar, the main rebel encampment. Despite the popular anti-rebel stance, the administration was embroiled in charges of cronyism and corruption; a scandal involving jueteng gambling led to his impeachment by the House of Representatives. In the impeachment trial, Estrada's allies in the Senate successfully prevented evidence to be presented; this triggered massive protests. Days later, in what would be called the EDSA II, the Armed Forces of the Philippines withdrew their support from Estrada and transferred their allegiance to Vice President Arroyo; the Supreme Court later ruled the presidency as vacant, and Estrada left Malacañang Palace.

Arroyo was sworn in as president on January 20, 2001. Four months later, after Estrada was officially charged with "plundering", his supporters launched their own mass movement, laying siege to the presidential palace. However, the movement did not succeed, and the protestors were later expelled. Arroyo's People Power Coalition won a majority of seats in the 2001 elections and therefore consolidated power. In 2003, Arroyo put down a coup attempt in the central business district. As Arroyo had served less than four years as president, she was eligible for re-election. She faced Fernando Poe Jr., a friend of Estrada, along with three others in 2004, and won on a slim plurality. Months after Poe died in December, it was exposed, via wiretapped conversations, that Arroyo rigged the election. On a national address, Arroyo said that she was "sorry on a lapse of judgment." The opposition did not let up, and she had to put down two more coup attempts. Following her election, Arroyo attempted to change the constitution and create a parliamentary system. This gained significant momentum and support from the House, but Senate opposition, a close Supreme Court ruling, and civil society opposition led to its failure. The opposition united in the 2007 Senate election and won easily, but Arroyo's allies still held the House of Representatives. By the end of her presidency, Arroyo was the most unpopular president since the 1986 People Power Revolution, with her administration being widely viewed as deeply corrupt. Despite this unpopularity there was no mass movement to replace Arroyo. In part this was due to fatigue from previous people power movements, which were regarded as having failed to cause enough change to the political system.

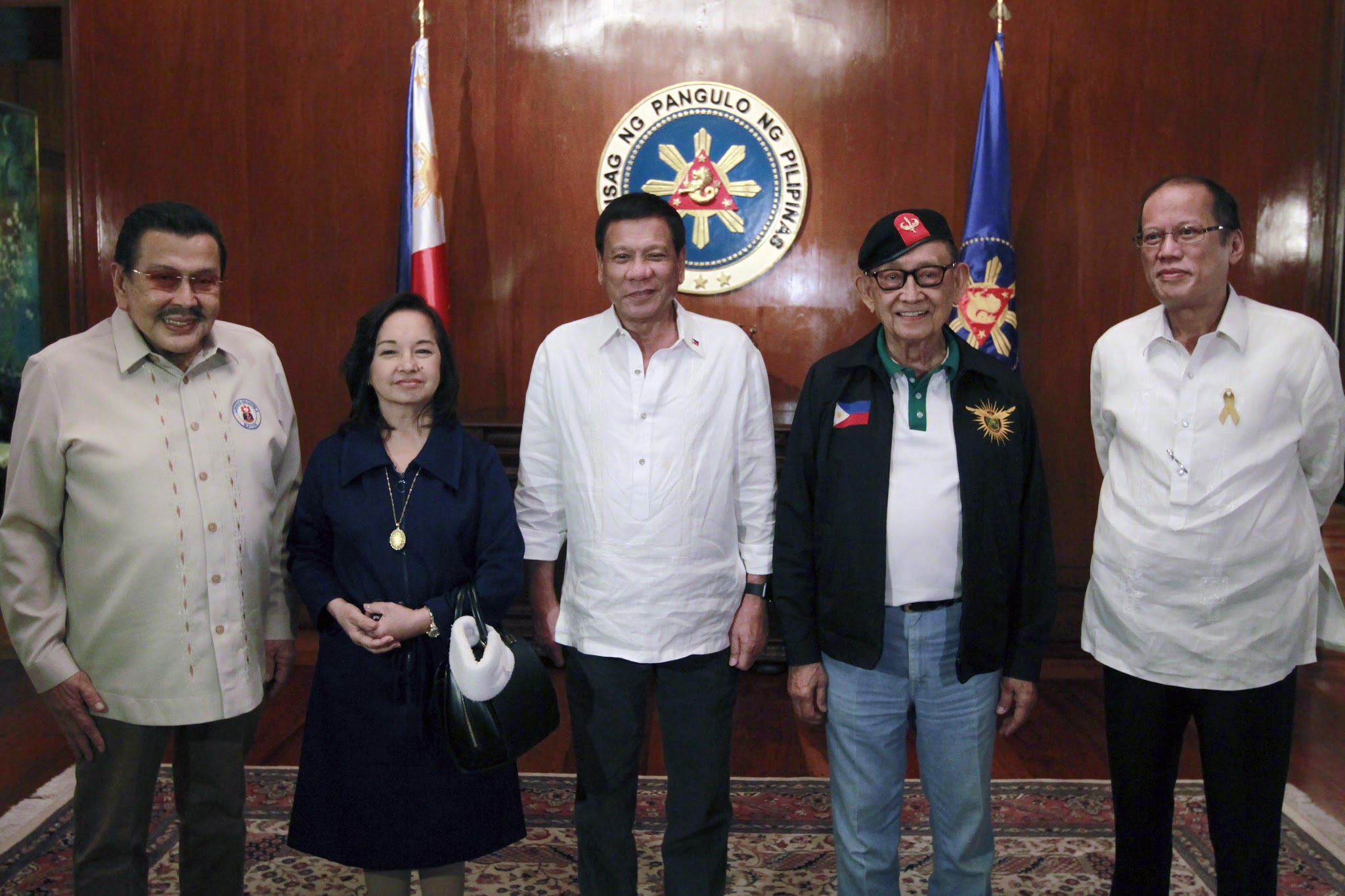
Presidents Joseph Estrada, Gloria Macapagal Arroyo, Rodrigo Duterte, Fidel V. Ramos, and Benigno Aquino III

Before the 2010 election, Arroyo's party nominated Gilberto Teodoro for president; however, some quarters suggested that Arroyo was secretly supporting Manny Villar, who was the front-runner at the time. The race changed following the death of former president Aquino, which led to her son Benigno Aquino III launching a campaign. Allegations of scandal led to Villar dropping in the polls, falling first behind Aquino, and then behind Estrada, who was running again following a pardon from Arroyo. Aquino embarked on an anti-corruption drive, saw the economy grow, and maintained high levels of popularity. It also sought to strengthen independent bodies, such as the Supreme Court and the Ombudsman. Overall, the Benigno Aquino administration was politically stable, seen as relatively clean, and had the highest ratings since Marcos. However, natural calamities, along with scams on the use of pork barrel and other discretionary funds coming to light, led to rising opposition in the final years of the administration. Such opposition became linked to perceptions about the failure of change within the wider political system, rather than to Aquino himself.

In 2016, Aquino's handpicked successor, Mar Roxas, was decisively defeated by Davao City mayor Rodrigo Duterte in the 2016 Presidential Election. Duterte ran on a populist platform, winning votes from various socioeconomic classes, with particularly strong appeal to the middle classes. His election victory was propelled by growing public frustration over the tumultuous post-EDSA democratic governance, which favored political and economic elite over ordinary Filipinos. Duterte implemented a massive war on drugs that resulted as of February 2022 in more than half of all barangays cleared of drugs but led to thousands of deaths. The opposition, now primarily Liberal Party, pro-Aquino figures, opposed the killings, branding them as human rights abuses. Duterte then prioritized infrastructure spending, and sought to end the communist insurgency, formally declaring the Communist Party of the Philippines-New Peoples Army (CPP-NPA) as a terrorist group, creating a reintegration program for former rebels, and granting amnesty to eligible members. The administration made peace with the Moro Islamic Liberation Front, agreeing to expand and empower autonomy in Muslim areas, replacing the ARMM with the more powerful Bangsamoro region. The opposition was wiped out in the 2019 midterms, where all of its senatorial candidates lost, and only a handful of winners in the lower house. The Duterte government has largely continued Aquino's economic policies, including those focused on the poor. Its political policies have shown a shift towards illiberal democracy, with the politicization of legal institutions and less regard for checks and balances.

Former senator and son of the late Ferdinand Marcos, Bongbong Marcos won the 2022 elections. This marked the family's return to Malacañang 36 years after the People Power Revolution which drove their family to exile. Duterte's daughter Sara Duterte also won as vice president. On 30 June 2022, Marcos was sworn in as the Philippine president and Sara Duterte was sworn in as vice-president.

== See also ==
- Politics of the Philippines
- Timeline of Philippine political history
