= Commonwealth of the Philippines =

US territory in Southeast Asia (1935-1946)

Commonwealth of the Philippines Mancomunidad de Filipinas (Spanish) Komonwelt ng Pilipinas (Tagalog)
- 1935–1946 (1942–1945: internationally recognized Government-in-exile)
- Flag of the United States Flag of the Commonwealth of the Philippines Flags (1935-1946) Coat of arms
- Anthem: "The Star-Spangled Banner" "The Philippine Hymn" (Note: Some sources assert that an English version written by Mary A. Lane and Camilo Osías was legalized by Commonwealth Act No. 382. The act, however, only concerns itself with the instrumental composition by Julián Felipe.)
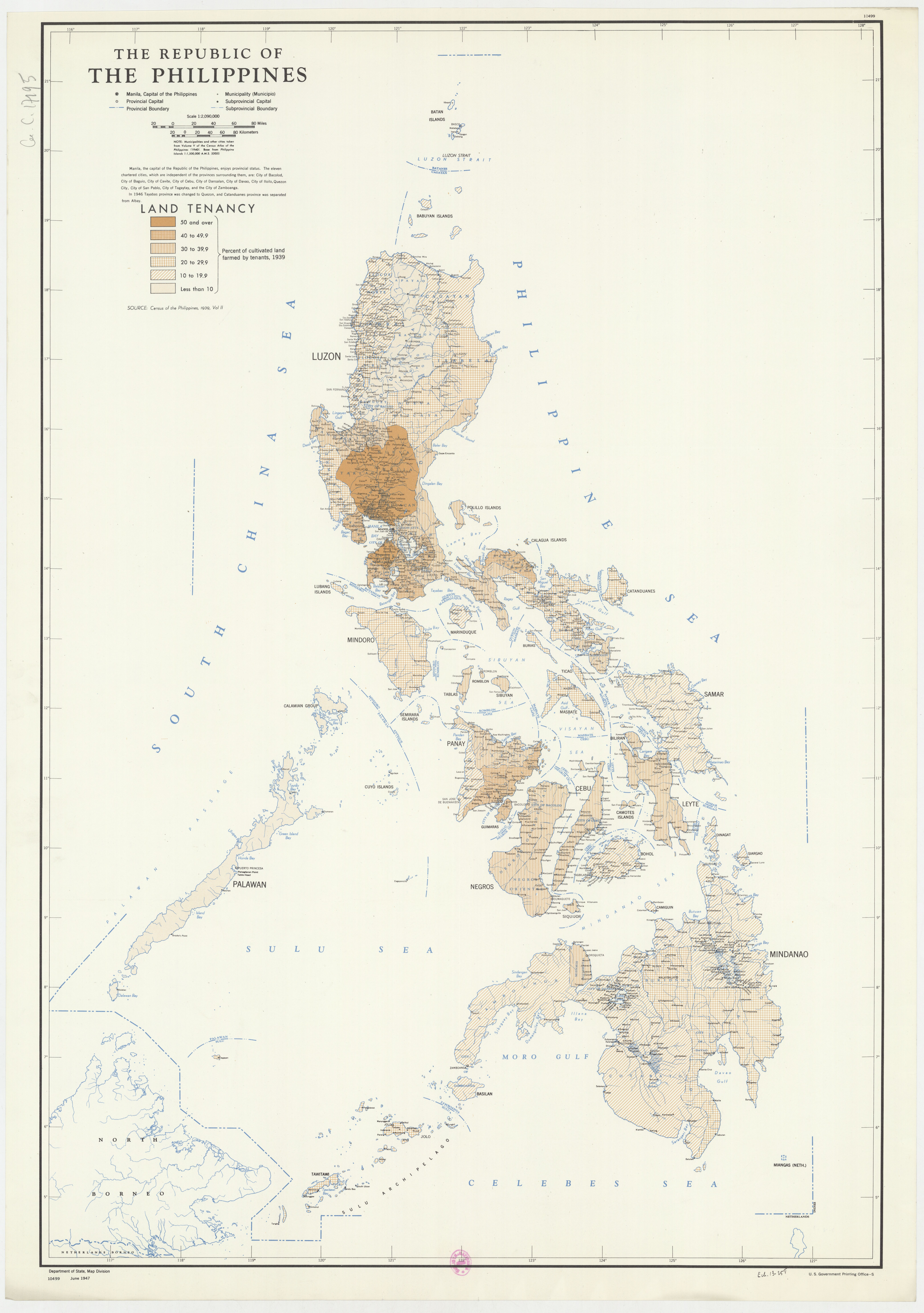
- 1940s map of the Philippines
- Status: Unincorporated and organized US commonwealth; transitional government (1935‍–‍1946) (Note: The Philippines belonged to, but were not a part of, the United States. See the Insular Cases article for more information.); Government-in-exile (1942‍–‍1945)
- Capital and largest city: Manila (Note: Capital held by enemy forces between December 24, 1941, and February 27, 1945. Temporary capitals were: Corregidor Island from December 24, 1941; Iloilo City from February 22, 1942; Bacolod from February 26; Buenos Aires, Bago from February 27; Oroquieta from March 19; Bukidnon from March 23; Government-in-exile in Melbourne, Australia, in April; Government-in-exile in Washington, D.C., from May 13, 1942, to October 1944; Tacloban from October 20, 1944.); 14°35′45″N 120°58′38″E
- Official languages: English; Spanish
- National language: Tagalog (Note: Later replaced by or redesignated as Filipino as the national language.)
- Religion: None official Majority: Christianity (Catholicism, Protestantism) Minority: Sunni Islam, Indigenous Philippine folk religions
- Government: Devolved presidential dependency within a federal republic
- High Commissioner
  - 1935–1937: Frank Murphy
  - 1937–1939: Paul V. McNutt
  - 1939–1942: Francis Bowes Sayre Sr.
  - 1942–1945 (in exile): Harold L. Ickes
  - 1945–1946: Paul V. McNutt
- President
  - 1935–1944: Manuel L. Quezon
  - 1944–1946: Sergio Osmeña
  - 1946: Manuel Roxas
- U.S. President
  - 1933–1945: Franklin D. Roosevelt
  - 1945–1946: Harry S. Truman
- Legislature: National Assembly (1935‍–‍1941); Congress (1945‍–‍1946)
  - Upper house: Senate (1945–1946)
  - Lower house: House of Representatives (1945–1946)
- Historical era: Interwar, World War II
  - Tydings–McDuffie Act: November 15, 1935
  - Government-in-exile: March 12, 1942
  - Restoration: February 27, 1945
  - Independence: July 4, 1946
  - Treaty of Manila: October 22, 1946
- Currency: Philippine peso (₱); United States dollar ($)
- Time zone: UTC+08:00 (PST)
Preceded by	Succeeded by
1935: Insular Government of the Philippine Islands; 1945: Second Philippine Republic	1942: Philippine Executive Commission; 1946: Third Philippine; Republic
- Today part of: Philippines

The Commonwealth of the Philippines (Spanish: Mancomunidad de Filipinas; Tagalog: Komonwelt ng Pilipinas) was an unincorporated territory and commonwealth (dependency) of the United States that existed from 1935 to 1946. It was established following the Tydings–McDuffie Act to replace the Insular Government of the Philippine Islands and was designed as a transitional administration in preparation for full Philippine independence. Its foreign affairs remained managed by the United States.

During its more than a decade of existence, the Commonwealth had a strong executive and a supreme court. Its legislature, dominated from the Nacionalista Party, was initially unicameral but later bicameral. In 1937, the government selected Tagalog – the language of the capital Manila and its surrounding provinces – as the basis of the national language, although it would be many years before its usage became general. Women's suffrage was adopted, and the economy recovered to pre-Depression levels before the Japanese invasion of the islands in 1941. A period of exile took place during World War II from 1942 to 1945, when Japan occupied the Philippines.

The Commonwealth officially ended on July 4, 1946, as the Philippines attained full sovereignty as provided for in Article XVIII of the 1935 Constitution.

== Name ==
The Commonwealth of the Philippines was also known as the "Philippine Commonwealth", or simply as "the Commonwealth". Its official name in Spanish, the other of the Commonwealth's two official languages, was Commonwealth de Filipinas ([filiˈpinas]). The 1935 Constitution uses "the Philippines" as the country's short-form name throughout its provisions, and uses "the Philippine Islands" only to refer to pre-1935 status and institutions. Under the Insular Government (1901–1935), both terms were official. (Note: See for example, the Jones Law of 1916, which uses "Philippines" and "Philippine Islands" interchangeably.) In 1937, Tagalog was declared to be the basis of a national language, effective after two years. The country's official name translated into Tagalog would be Komonwelt ng Pilipinas ([pɪlɪˈpinas]).

== History ==
=== Creation ===
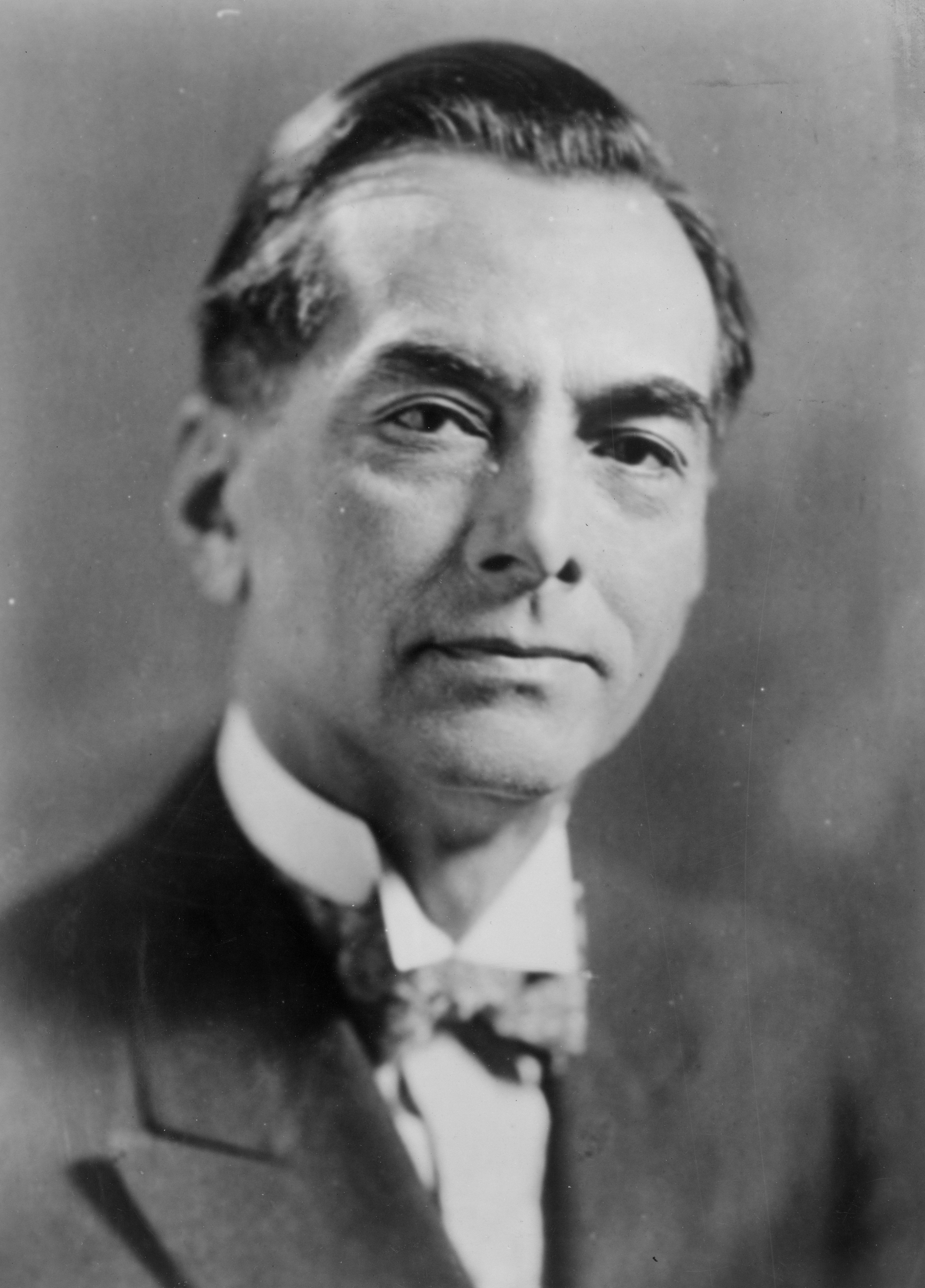
President Manuel L. Quezon of the Philippines

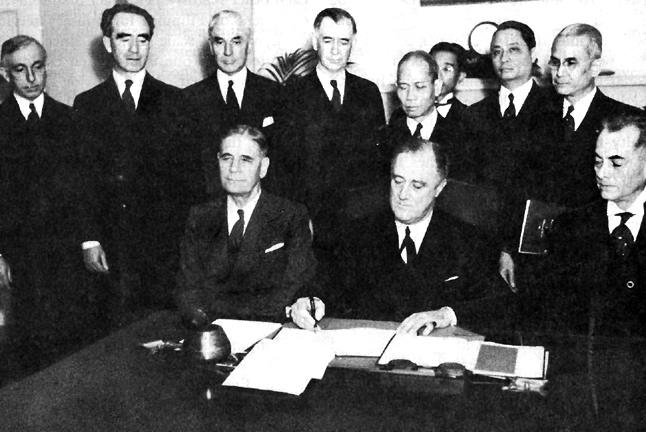
March 23, 1935: Constitutional Convention. Seated, left to right: George H. Dern, President Franklin D. Roosevelt, and Manuel L. Quezon

The pre-1935 US territorial administration, or Insular Government, was headed by a Governor-General appointed by the President of the United States. In December 1932, the United States Congress passed the Hare–Hawes–Cutting Act with the premise of granting Filipinos independence. Provisions of the law included reserving several military and naval bases for the United States, as well as imposing tariffs and quotas on Philippine exports. When it reached him for a possible signature, President Herbert Hoover vetoed the Hare–Hawes–Cutting Act, but the United States Congress overrode Hoover's veto in 1933 and passed the law despite Hoover's objections. The bill, however, was opposed by then-Philippine Senate President Manuel L. Quezon and was also rejected by the Philippine Senate.

This led to the creation and passing of the Tydings–McDuffie Act (Note: Officially, the Philippine Independence Act; Pub. L. 73–127; approved on March 24, 1934.) or the Philippine Independence Act, which allowed the establishment of the Commonwealth of the Philippines with a ten-year period of peaceful transition to full independence – the date of which was to be 4 July after the tenth anniversary of the establishment of the Commonwealth.

A Constitutional Convention was convened in Manila on July 30, 1934, and on February 8, 1935, the 1935 Constitution of the Commonwealth of the Philippines was approved by the convention by a vote of 177 to 1. The Constitution was approved by President Franklin D. Roosevelt on March 25, 1935, and ratified by plebiscite on May 14, 1935.

On September 16, 1935, presidential elections were held. Candidates included former president Emilio Aguinaldo, Philippine Independent Church Obispo Máximo Gregorio Aglipay, and others. Manuel L. Quezon and Sergio Osmeña of the Nacionalista Party won the presidency and vice-presidency, respectively.

The Commonwealth government was inaugurated on the morning of November 15, 1935, in ceremonies on the steps of the Legislative Building in Manila. The event was attended by a crowd of some 300,000 people.

=== Pre-war ===
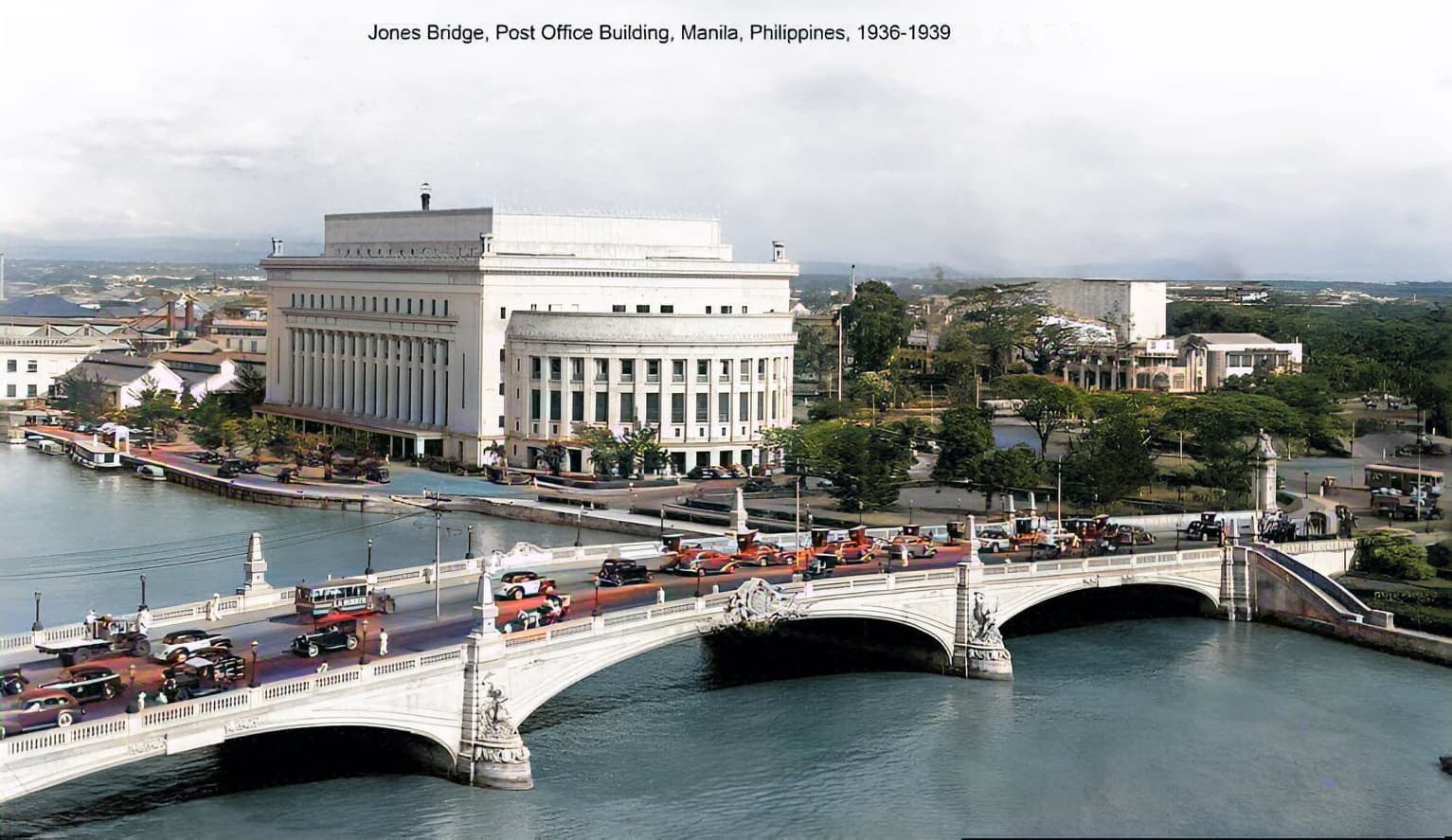
Manila circa 1936–1939.

The new Commonwealth government embarked on ambitious nation-building policies in preparation for economic and political independence. These included national defense (such as the National Defense Act of 1935, which organized conscription in the country), greater control over the economy, the perfection of democratic institutions, education reforms, the improvement of transport, the promotion of local capital, and industrialization.

However, several uncertainties proved to be major problems, especially the diplomatic and military situation in Southeast Asia, the level of US commitment to the eventual Republic of the Philippines, and economic factors due to the Great Depression. The situation was further complicated by the presence of agrarian unrest and power struggles between Osmeña and Quezon, especially after Quezon was permitted re-election after a six-year term.

A proper evaluation of the policies' effectiveness or failure is difficult due to the Japanese invasion and occupation during World War II.

=== World War II ===
Imperial Japan launched a surprise attack on the Philippines on the morning of December 8, 1941. The Commonwealth government drafted the Philippine Army into the US Army Forces Far East, which would resist Japanese occupation. Manila was declared an open city to prevent its destruction, and occupied by the Japanese on January 2, 1942. Meanwhile, fighting against the Japanese continued on the Bataan Peninsula, Corregidor, and Leyte until the final surrender of joint United States-Philippine forces in May 1942.

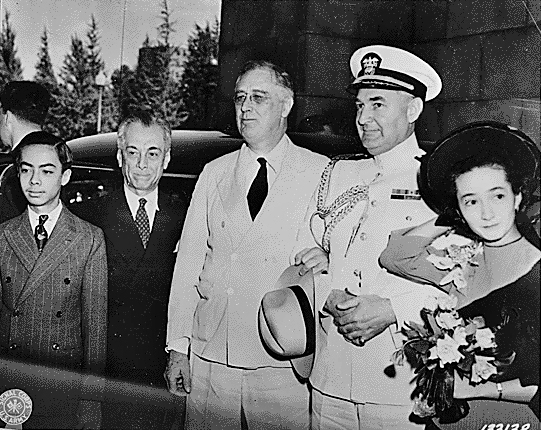
Manuel L. Quezon visiting Franklin D. Roosevelt in Washington, D.C., while in exile

Quezon and Osmeña were escorted by troops from Manila to Corregidor, and later evacuated to Australia prior to heading for the mainland United States, where they set up a government-in-exile headquartered at the Shoreham Hotel in Washington, D.C. This government participated in the Pacific War Council as well as the Declaration by United Nations. Quezon fell ill with tuberculosis and died from it, with Osmeña succeeding him as president.

The main general headquarters of the Philippine Commonwealth Army (PCA), located at the military station in Ermita, Manila, was closed down on December 24, 1941. It was seized by Imperial Japanese Imperial troops when they occupied the capital on January 2, 1942. Elsewhere in the country, other military posts of the PCA in Luzon, the Visayas, and Mindanao engaged in military action against the Japanese.

Meanwhile, the Japanese military organized the Second Philippine Republic, headed by President Jose P. Laurel. This pro-Japanese puppet state proved very unpopular.

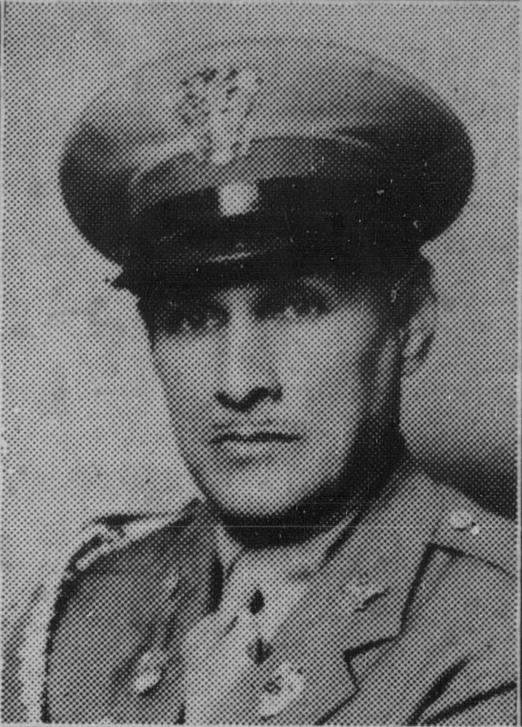
Colonel Manuel Nieto, loyal assistant of President Quezon.

Resistance to Japanese occupation continued across the Philippines. This included the Hukbalahap (from the Tagalog acronym for "People's Army Against the Japanese"), which consisted of 30,000 armed men and controlled much of Central Luzon; they attacked both Japanese and other non-Huk guerrillas. Remnants of the Philippine Commonwealth Army, as well as remnant Americans, also successfully fought the Japanese through guerrilla warfare. These efforts eventually liberated all but 12 of the country's then 48 provinces.

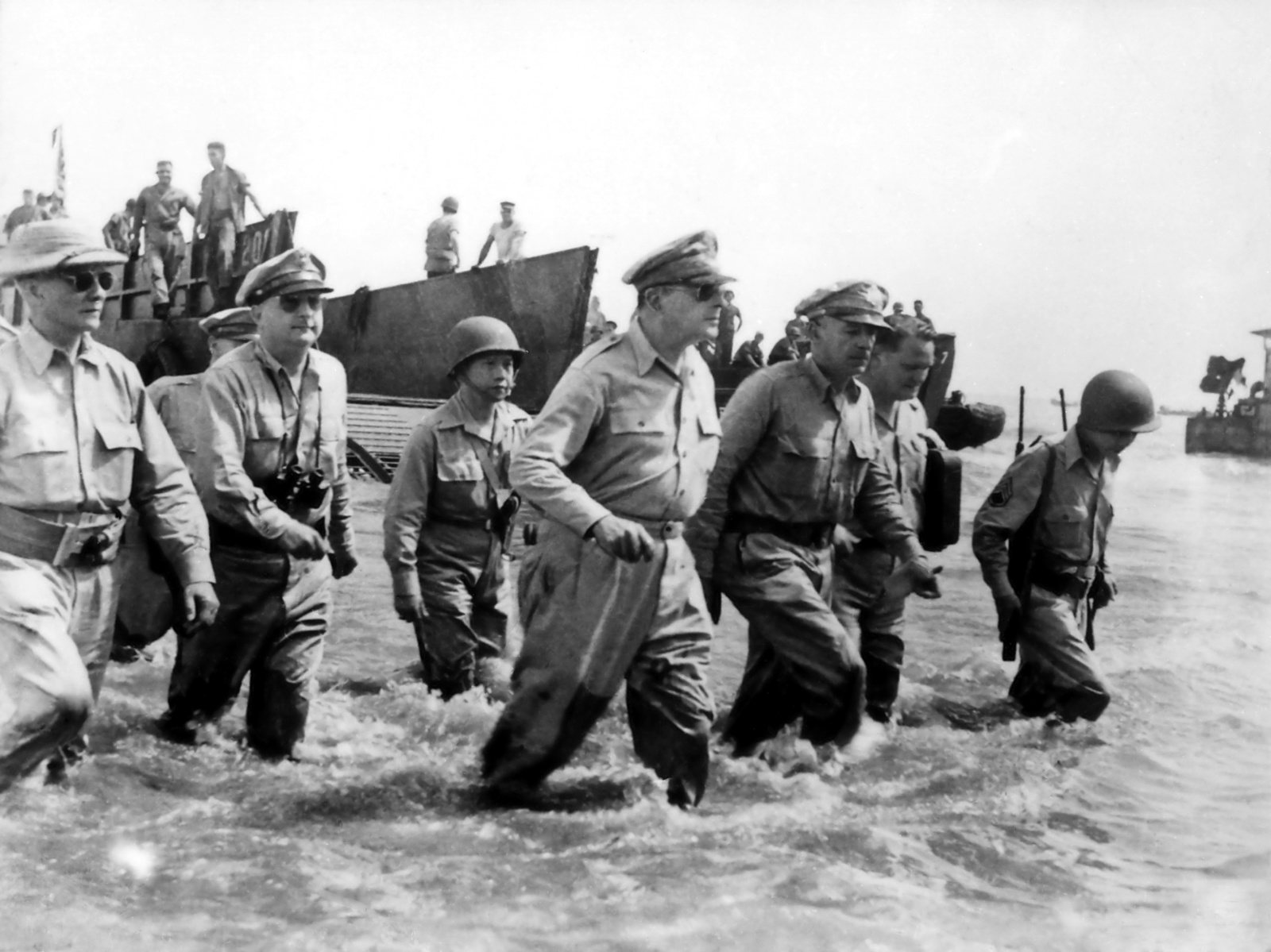
General MacArthur and President Osmeña returning to the Philippines

General Douglas MacArthur's army landed on Leyte on October 20, 1944, as did the Philippine Commonwealth troops who arrived in other amphibious landings. The Philippine Constabulary was placed on active service with the Philippine Commonwealth Army and re-established from October 28, 1944, to June 30, 1946, during the Allied liberation and the post–World War II era. Fighting continued in remote corners of the Philippines until Japan's official surrender in August 1945, which was signed on September 2 in Tokyo Bay. Estimates of Filipino war dead reached one million, and Manila was extensively damaged when Japanese marines refused to vacate the city despite orders from the Japanese High Command. After the war in the Philippines, the Commonwealth was restored, and a one-year transitional period began in preparation for independence. Elections followed in April 1946, with Manuel Roxas winning as the first President of the independent Republic of the Philippines and Elpidio Quirino winning as vice president.

=== Independence of the Philippines ===
The Commonwealth was dissolved when the US recognized Philippine independence on July 4, 1946, as scheduled. However, the economy remained dependent on the US due to the Bell Trade Act, otherwise known as the Philippine Trade Act, which a precondition for receiving war rehabilitation grants from the United States.

== Policies ==
=== Uprisings and agrarian reform ===
During the Commonwealth period, tenant farmers held grievances often rooted in debt caused by the sharecropping system, as well as a dramatic population boom which further strained tenant farmers' families. An agrarian reform program was initiated by the Commonwealth government, but its success was hampered by ongoing clashes between tenants and landowners.

An example of class conflict was the violence instigated by Benigno Ramos through his Sakdalista movement, which advocated tax reductions, land reform, the breakup of large estates or haciendas, and the cutting of American ties. His uprising, which occurred in Central Luzon in May 1935, claimed about a hundred lives.

=== National language ===
As per the 1935 Constitution, the Commonwealth had two official languages: English and Tagalog. Due to the diverse number of Philippine languages, a provision calling for the "development and adoption of a common national language based on the existing native dialects" was drafted into the 1935 Constitution. In 1936, the National Assembly enacted Commonwealth Act No. 184, creating the Surián ng Wikang Pambansà (National Language Institute). This body was initially composed of President Quezon and six other members from various ethnic groups. In 1937, deliberations by the Surián had resulted in its selection of Tagalog as the basis for the national language. This was made official on December 30, 1937, in an executive order which became effective two years later.

In 1940, the government authorized the creation of a dictionary and grammar for the language. In that same year, Commonwealth Act 570 was passed, allowing Filipino to become an official language upon independence.

== Economy ==
The cash economy of the Commonwealth was mostly agriculture-based. Products included abaca, coconuts and coconut oil, sugar, and timber. Numerous other crops and livestock were grown for local consumption by the Filipino people. Other sources for foreign income included the spin-off from money spent at American military bases on the Philippines such as the naval base at Subic Bay and Clark Air Base (with US Army airplanes there as early as 1919), both on the island of Luzon.

The performance of the economy was initially good despite challenges from various agrarian uprisings. Taxes collected from a robust coconut industry helped boost the economy by funding infrastructure and other development projects. However, growth was halted due to the outbreak of World War II.

== Demographics ==
In 1939, a census of the Philippines was taken and determined that it had a population of 16,000,303; of these 15.7 million were counted as "Brown", 141.8 thousand as "Yellow", 50.5 thousand as "Mixed", 29.1 thousand as "Negro", 19.3 thousand as "White", and under 1 thousand "Other". In 1941, the estimated population of the Philippines reached 17,000,000; there were 117,000 Chinese, 30,000 Japanese, and 9,000 Americans. English was spoken by 26.3% of the population, according to the 1939 Census. Spanish, after English overtook it beginning in the 1920s, became a language for the elite and in government; it was later banned during the Japanese occupation.

Estimated numbers of speakers of the dominant languages:

- Cebuano: 4,620,685
- Tagalog: 3,068,565
- Ilocano: 2,353,518
- Hiligaynon: 1,951,005
- Waray: 920,009
- Kapampangan: 621,455
- Pangasinan: 573,752

== Government ==
The Commonwealth had its own constitution, which remained effective after independence until 1973, and was self-governing although foreign policy and military affairs would be under the responsibility of the United States, and Laws passed by the legislature affecting immigration, foreign trade, and the currency system had to be approved by the United States president. Despite maintaining ultimate sovereignty, in some ways the US government treated the Commonwealth as a sovereign state, and the Philippines sometimes acted in a state capacity in international relations.

During the 1935–1941 period, the Commonwealth of the Philippines featured a very strong executive, a unicameral National Assembly, and a Supreme Court, all composed entirely of Filipinos, as well as an elected Resident Commissioner to the United States House of Representatives (as Puerto Rico does today). An American High Commissioner and an American Military Advisor, Douglas MacArthur headed the latter office from 1937 until the advent of World War II in 1941, holding the military rank of Field Marshal of the Philippines. After 1946, the rank of field marshal disappeared from the Philippine military.

During 1939 and 1940, after an amendment in the Commonwealth's Constitution, a bicameral Congress, consisting of a Senate, and of a House of Representatives, was restored, replacing the National Assembly.

== Politics ==
=== List of presidents ===
The colors indicate the political party or coalition of each president at Election Day.

#	President	Took office	Left office	Party	Vice President	Term
1	Manuel L. Quezon	November 15, 1935	August 1, 1944 (Note: Died of tuberculosis in Saranac Lake in New York.)	Nacionalista	Sergio Osmeña	1
1	Manuel L. Quezon	November 15, 1935	August 1, 1944	Nacionalista	Sergio Osmeña	2
2	Sergio Osmeña	August 1, 1944	May 28, 1946	Nacionalista	vacant	2
3	Manuel Roxas	May 28, 1946	July 4, 1946 (Note: End of Commonwealth government, independent Republic inaugurated.)	Liberal	Elpidio Quirino	3

=== Quezon administration (1935–1944) ===
In 1935, Quezon won the Philippines' first national presidential election under the banner of the Nacionalista Party. He obtained nearly 68% of the vote against his two main rivals, Emilio Aguinaldo and Bishop Gregorio Aglipay. Quezon was inaugurated on November 15, 1935. He is recognized as the second President of the Philippines. When Manuel L. Quezon was inaugurated President of the Philippines in 1935, he became the first Filipino to head a government of the Philippines since Emilio Aguinaldo and the Malolos Republic in 1898. However, in January 2008, Congressman Rodolfo Valencia of Oriental Mindoro filed a bill seeking instead to declare General Miguel Malvar as the second Philippine President, who took control over all Filipino forces after American soldiers captured President Emilio Aguinaldo in Palanan, Isabela on March 23, 1901.

Quezon had originally been barred by the Philippine constitution from seeking re-election. However, in 1940, constitutional amendments were ratified allowing him to seek re-election for a fresh term ending in 1943. In the 1941 presidential elections, Quezon was re-elected over former Senator Juan Sumulong with nearly 82% of the vote.

In a notable humanitarian act, Quezon, in cooperation with US High Commissioner Paul V. McNutt, facilitated the entry into the Philippines of Jewish refugees fleeing fascist regimes in Europe. Quezon was also instrumental in promoting a project to resettle the refugees in Mindanao.

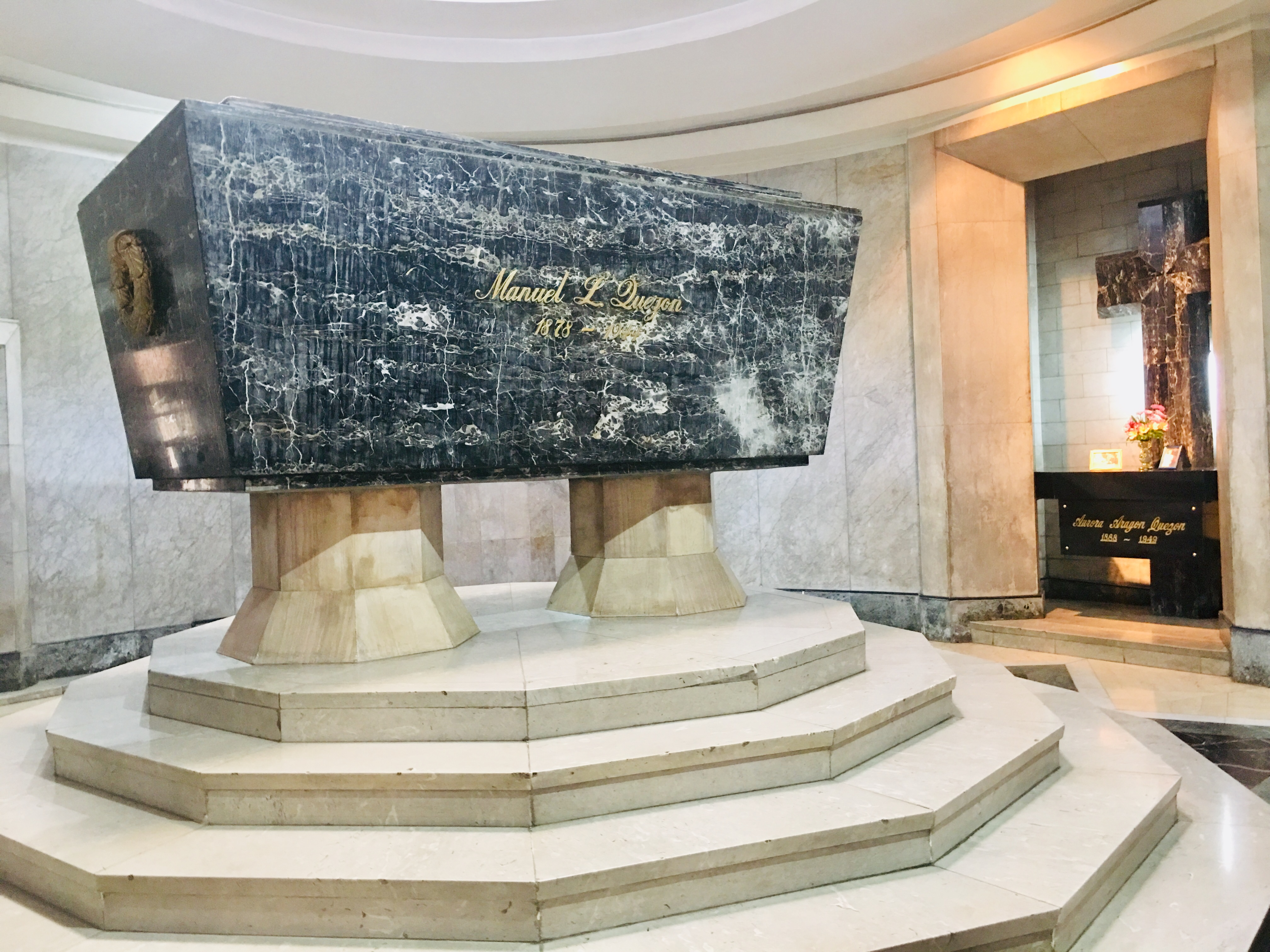
Tomb of President Quezon and his wife Aurora at Museo ni Quezon, Quezon Memorial Circle, Quezon City

The Japanese invasion of the Philippines began with an invasion of Batan Island on December 8, 1941. When advancing Japanese forces threatened Manila, President Quezon, other senior officials of the Commonwealth government, and senior American military commanders relocated to Corregidor, and Manila was declared an open city. On February 20, Quezon, his family, and senior officials of the Commonwealth government were evacuated from the island by submarine on the first leg of what came to be a relocation of the Commonwealth government in exile to the US.

Quezon suffered from tuberculosis and spent his last years in a "cure cottage" in Saranac Lake, NY, where he died on August 1, 1944. He was initially buried in Arlington National Cemetery. His body was later carried by the USS Princeton and re-interred in Manila at the Manila North Cemetery in 1979, his remains were moved to Quezon City within the monument at the Quezon Memorial Circle.

=== Osmeña administration (1944–1946) ===
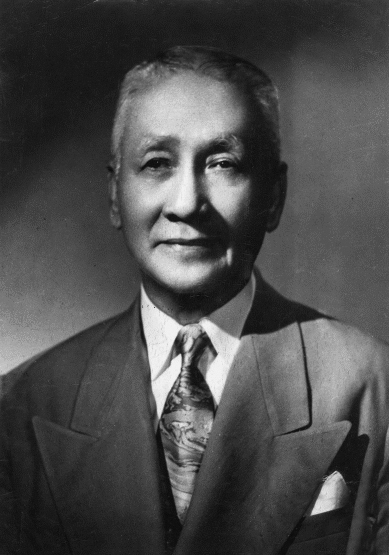
Sergio Osmeña, president from 1944 to 1946

Osmeña became president of the Commonwealth on Quezon's death in 1944. He returned to the Philippines the same year with General Douglas MacArthur and the liberation forces. After the war Osmeña restored the Commonwealth government and the various executive departments. He continued the fight for Philippine independence.

For the presidential election of 1946, Osmeña refused to campaign, saying that the Filipino people knew of his record of 40 years of honest and faithful service. Nevertheless, he was defeated by Manuel Roxas, who won 54% of the vote and became the first president of the independent Republic of the Philippines.

=== Roxas administration (May 28, 1946 – July 4, 1946) ===
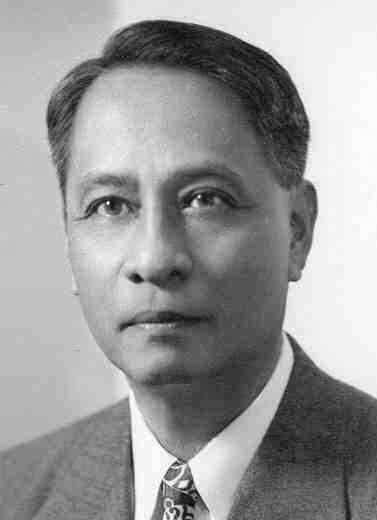
Manuel Roxas, last president of the Commonwealth

Roxas served as the President of the Commonwealth of the Philippines in a brief period, from his subsequent election on May 28, 1946, to July 4, 1946, the scheduled date of the proclamation of Philippine Independence. Roxas prepared the groundwork for the advent of a free and independent Philippines, assisted by the Congress (reorganized May 25, 1946), with Senator José Avelino as the Senate President and Congressman Eugenio Pérez as the House of Representatives Speaker. On June 3, 1946, Roxas appeared for the first time before the joint session of the Congress to deliver his first state of the nation address. Among other things, he told the members of the Congress the grave problems and difficulties the Philippines were set to face and reported on his special trip to the US – the approval for independence.

On June 21, he reappeared in another joint session of the Congress and urged the acceptance of two important laws passed by the US Congress on April 30, 1946, regarding the Philippine lands. They are the Philippine Rehabilitation Act and the Philippine Trade Act, which subjected the Philippine economy to continued American control. Both recommendations were accepted by the Congress, after elected Congressmen from the leftist Democratic Alliance and Nacionalistas were denied the right to take their seats to vote against them.

== See also ==
- Commonwealth (U.S. insular area)
- Political history of the Philippines
- History of the Philippines
- Philippine Organic Act (1902)
- Jones Law (Philippines) Philippines Organic Act (1916)
- Treaty of Paris (1898)
- Filipino Repatriation Act of 1935
- Hare–Hawes–Cutting Act (1932)

== Bibliography ==
- Philippine Legislature, 100 Years, Philippine Historical Association, New Day Publishers, 2000, ISBN 971-92245-0-9.
- Agoncillo, Teodoro A; Guerrero, Milagros (1970), History of the Filipino People, Malaya Books
- ——— (2001), The Fateful Years: Japan's Adventure in the Philippines 1941–1945, vol. 1, Quezon City, Philippines: University of the Philippines Press, ISBN 978-971-542-274-1.
- Gin Ooi, Keat (2004), Southeast Asia: a historical encyclopedia, from Angkor Wat to East Timor, ABC-CLIO, ISBN 978-1-57607-770-2.
- Hayden, Joseph Ralston (1942), The Philippines, a Study in National Development, Macmillan.
- Lacsamana, Leodivico Cruz (1990), Philippine History and Government, Phoenix, ISBN 971-06-1894-6.
- Roces; Luna, Juan Luis Z Jr; Arcilla, Reynaldo (1986), RR Philippine almanac: book of facts, Ramon Roces y Pardo.
- Seekins, Donald M. (1993), "Historical Setting", in Dolan, Ronald E. (ed.), Philippines: A Country Study (4th ed.), Washington: GPO for the Library of Congress, pp. 1–63, ISBN 0-8444-0748-8.
- Weir, Fraser (1998), "American Colony and Philippine Commonwealth 1901–1941", A Centennial History of Philippine Independence, 1898–1998, archived from the original on July 24, 2020
- Zaide, Sonia M (1994), The Philippines: A Unique Nation, All-Nations, ISBN 971-642-071-4
