= Hare–Hawes–Cutting Act =

1933 U.S. federal law for granting Philippine independence

- Long title: An act envisaging a 10-year transitory period during which time the Philippines would establish a semi-autonomous government under an elected Filipino president.
- Enacted by: the 72nd United States Congress

Legislative history
- Vetoed by President Herbert Hoover on 1933

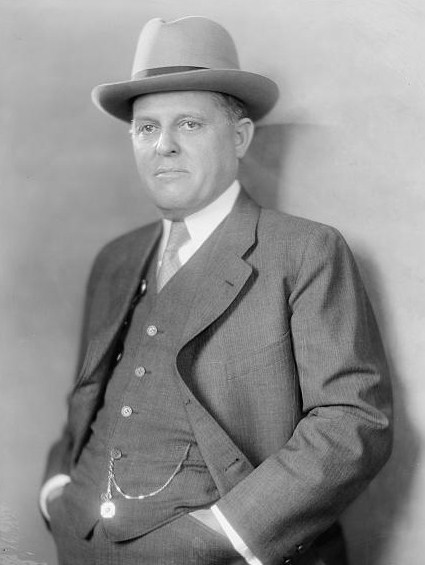
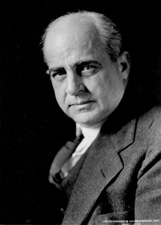
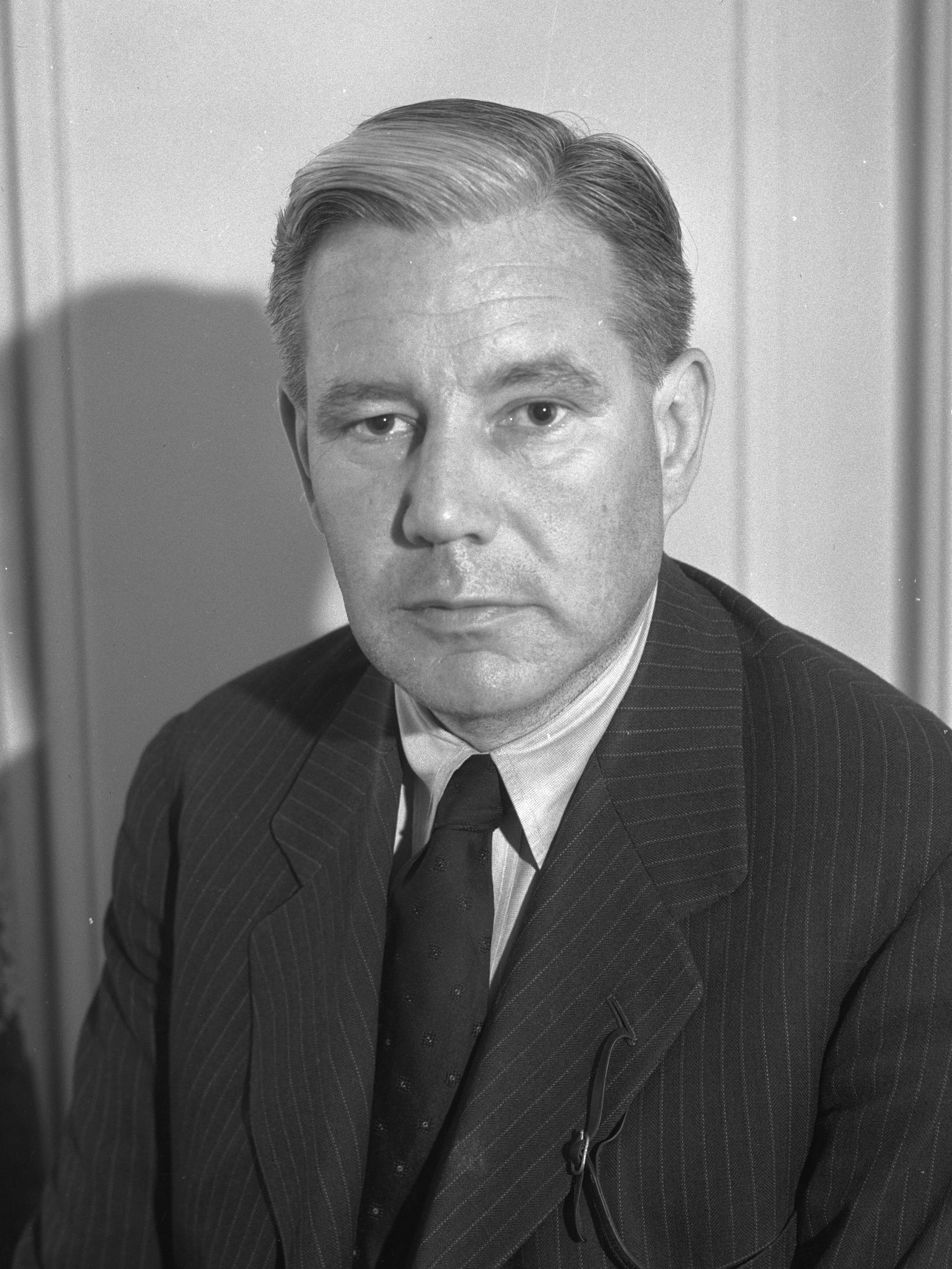
(from left) Representative Butler B. Hare, Senator Harry Bartow Hawes, and Senator Bronson M. Cutting, the main authors of the Act

The Hare–Hawes–Cutting Act passed to authors Congress Butler B. Hare, Senator Harry B. Hawes, and Senator Bronson M. Cutting. (ch. 11, 47 Stat. 761, enacted January 17, 1933) The Hare–Hawes–Cutting Act was the first US law passed setting a process and a date for the Philippines to gain independence from the United States. It was the result of the OsRox Mission led by Sergio Osmeña and Manuel Roxas. The law promised Philippine independence after 10 years but reserved several military and naval bases for the United States, as well as imposed tariffs and quotas on Philippine imports.

== History ==
In November 1931, Senate President Manuel L. Quezon made a report to the Philippine Legislature. The report included Quezon's three proposals to Washington regarding Philippine Independence: Firstly, he proposed absolute and complete independence of the Philippines from the United States. Alternatively, he proposed the establishment of an autonomous government for ten years with safeguards to U.S. sovereign rights in the country. Finally, in the event the U.S. Congress disliked either of those options. Quezon proposed that Filipinos would accept any laws granting complete independence, even with the most "burdensome conditions". Unfortunately for Quezon, all of these proposals were rejected by the administration of U.S. President Herbert Hoover.

By 1932, two main groups supported a law outlining the specifics of Philippine independence: Great Depression-era American farmers competing against tariff-free Filipino sugar and coconut oil; and Filipinos seeking Philippine independence. The Hare–Hawes–Cutting Act was authored by South Carolina Representative Butler Hare, Missouri Senator Harry Bartow Hawes and New Mexico Senator Bronson M. Cutting.

After the bill was amended by the U.S. Senate Committee on Territories and Insular Affairs (1929–1946) in April 1932, it was taken to the Senate floor. Two amendments were introduced by American senators. Senator William H. King provided independence for the Philippines in three years while Senator Arthur Vandenberg provided twenty years for independence. Senator Royal Copeland then argued that an alienation of American territory required not by Congressional action but by constitutional amendment. Due to disagreements within the U.S. Senate, the Philippine bill was postponed until the Seventy-second Congress session in December 1932.

=== Opposition ===
To counter the opposition of the bill from the Secretary of War Patrick J. Hurley, Senator Hawes requested help from former Governor-General William Cameron Forbes to make suggestions. Forbes suggested that the U.S. president intervene in the foreign and fiscal matters in the Philippines. Hawes withdrew Forbes' proposal of the U.S. president the right to appoint justices of the Philippine Supreme Court. Quezon objected with these amendments. He responded to Hawes that Forbes was just a figurehead in the Philippines and the real governor was the American High Commissioner.

Although Quezon deemed the OsRox Mission to the United States a success in April 1932 for the secured passage of the bill, opposition began to mount among Filipino leaders because of provisions maintaining American commercial and military interests.

By the time the U.S. Senate reopened discussion on the Philippine bill in December 1932, there were demonstrations and protests against it. It passed by the United States Congress in December 1932 but was vetoed by U.S. President Herbert Hoover.

Due to this sudden turn of events, Quezon, who declined an invite for the mission to the United States in September 1932, went on leave in the Philippine Senate. Quezon then reorganized the Philippine Legislature with Jose Clarin as acting senate president pro tempore, (Note: Benigno Aquino, Sr. was previously acting senate pro tempore due to Sergio Osmeña's absence until he was dispatched to the United States in late 1932) Elpidio Quirino as acting senate majority leader, and Quintin Paredes as acting house speaker (Note: Antonio de las Alas was previously acting house speaker due to Manuel Roxas' absence. He was succeeded by Paredes as Speaker pro tempore in January 1933). Quezon announced that he would join the mission to the U.S. and left for Washington in early 1933.

Congress overrode the veto on January 17, 1933. The Philippine Senate was required to ratify the law. However, Filipino leaders such as Manuel L. Quezon were opposed to it, for some provisions were unrelated to independence. In April 1933, Paredes, who was acting house speaker, cabled Quezon that the Majority Legislature remained anxious whether to reject the bill. Quirino, who was acting senate majority leader, made a campaign against the bill. He later joined Benigno Aquino Sr., who returned home, to criticize Quezon's leadership. Quezon wished to amend the act so that the Philippine Legislature could ratify it. Unfortunately, Senator Joseph T. Robinson rebuffed him instead in a conference that same month.

In August 1933, Quezon, along with Filipino diplomats, returned to the Philippines. Quezon clashed with Sergio Osmeña regarding the acceptance of the Hare-Hawes Cutting Act. While Osmeña, along with Manuel Roxas, campaigned for the support on acceptance of the act, Quezon campaigned for the rejection of it in the Philippine Legislature.

The Philippine Senate later rejected the bill. According to Jose Clarin, who provided the statistics, there were 7 pro-senators who supported the act, 17 anti-senators, 24 pro-representatives, and 58 anti-representatives.

== Bill ==
The bill itself proposed to have a 10-year transitionary period where the government will establish a semi-autonomous government under an elected president. As reported by the U.S. Senate Committee on Territories and Insular Affairs (1929–1946), the bill contained these significant provisions:

- free trade for ten years except in excess of the present trade of sugar, coconut oil, and cordage
- progressive export tax on Philippine imports beginning on the eleventh year, with full tariff imposed on the fifteenth year
- a plebiscite on Philippine independence for fifteen years
- a maximum annual quota limited to 100 Filipino immigrants
- retention of U.S. military and naval bases in the Philippines
- accepted enacted legislation is subject to ratification by the Philippine Legislature or a created convention for that purpose

== Aftermath ==
After the rejection, a new bill, the Tydings–McDuffie Act of 1934, was passed by the United States Government. This was ratified by the Philippine Senate for eliminating the rejection reasons and resulted in the 1935 Philippine Constitution, the establishment of the Philippine Commonwealth and ultimately Philippine independence on July 4, 1946.

== See also ==
- Political history of the Philippines
- History of the Philippines
- Philippine Organic Act (1902)
- Jones Law (Philippines) or the Philippines Autonomy Act (1916)
