= OsRox Mission =

Philippine independence mission led by Sergio Osmeña and Manuel Roxas

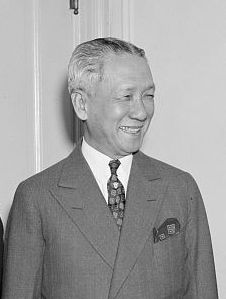
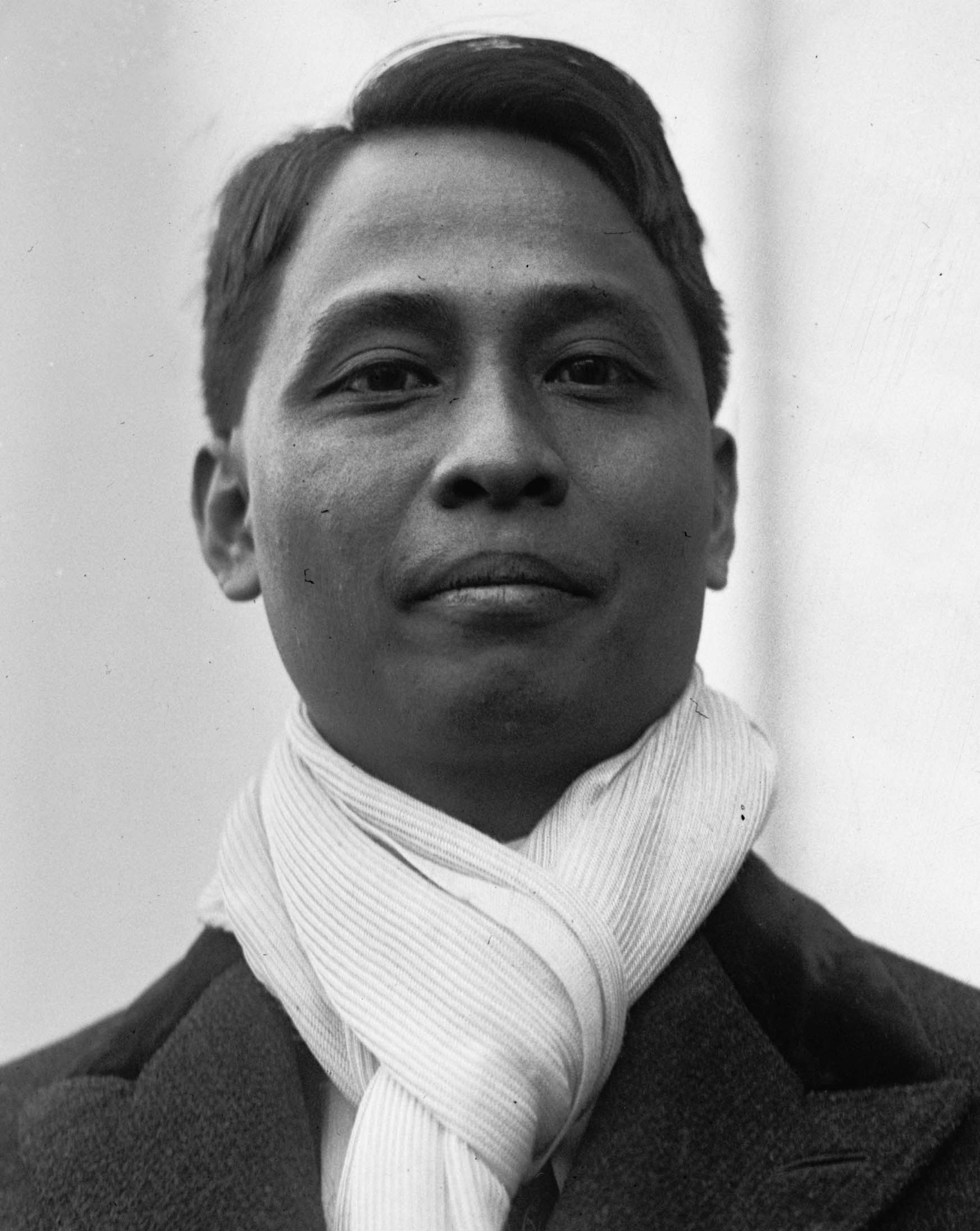
Sergio Osmeña and Manuel Roxas, the two leaders of the OsRox Mission

The OsRox Mission (1931) was a campaign for self-government and United States recognition of the independence of the Philippines led by former House Speaker and Senator Sergio Osmeña and House Speaker Manuel Roxas. The mission secured the Hare–Hawes–Cutting Act, which was rejected by the Philippine Legislature and Manuel Quezon.

== Aftermath ==
In November 1933, Quezon embarked on the last independence mission to the US to try to secure a better independence bill for the Philippines. He was not as successful as Osmeña and Roxas, as the result of the mission was a near copy of the Hare–Hawes–Cutting Act called the Tydings–McDuffie Act. It removed the provision of military reservations in the Philippines and substituted another for "ultimate settlement as to naval bases and fueling stations." It was passed by US President Franklin Roosevelt and was unanimously passed by the Philippine Legislature.

== See also ==
- Jones Law
- Butler B. Hare, Harry B. Hawes, Bronson M. Cutting
- Millard Tydings, John McDuffie

== Notes ==
- Halili, Maria Christine. Philippine History: Rex Bookstore, Inc., 2004. ISBN 9712339343
