= Tydings–McDuffie Act =

1934 U.S. federal law providing the Philippines with a process for independence

Philippine Independence Act of 1934
- Other short titles: Tydings–McDuffie Act
- Long title: An act to provide for the complete independence of the Philippine Islands, to provide for the adoption of a constitution and a form of government for the Philippine Islands, and for other purposes.
- Enacted by: the 73rd United States Congress
- Effective: May 1, 1934

Citations
- Public law: Pub. L. 73–127
- Statutes at Large: 48 Stat. 456

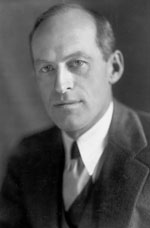
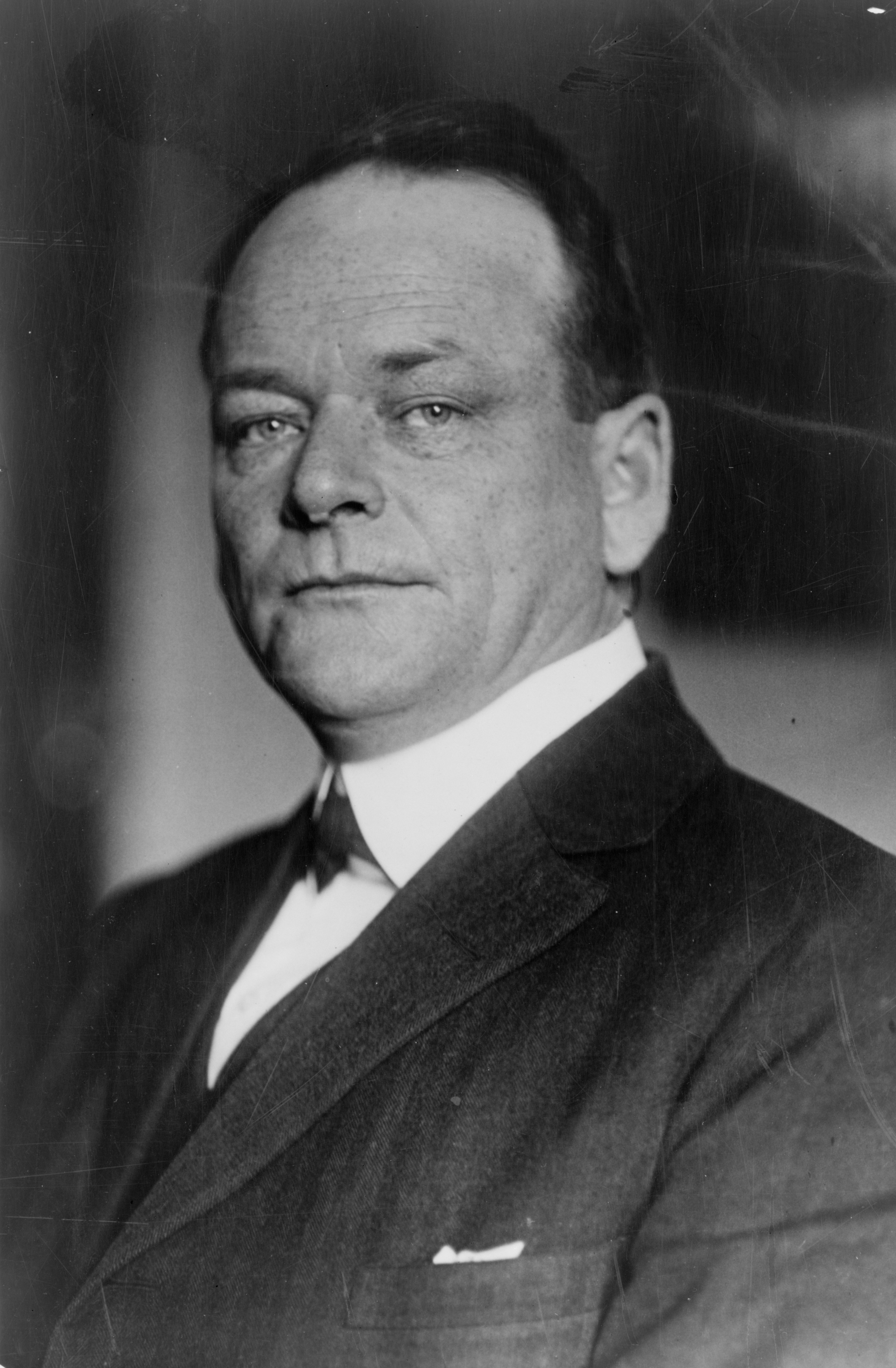
Senator Millard Tydings and Representative John McDuffie co-authored the Tydings–McDuffie Act.

The Philippine Independence Act, or Tydings–McDuffie Act (Pub. L. 73–127, 48 Stat. 456, enacted March 24, 1934), is an Act of Congress that established the process for the Philippines, then a US territory, to become an independent country after a ten-year transition period. Under the act, the 1935 Constitution of the Philippines was written and the Commonwealth of the Philippines was established, with the first directly elected president of the Philippines. (Direct elections to the Philippine Legislature had been held since 1907.) It also established limitations on Filipino immigration to the United States.

The act was authored in the 73rd United States Congress by Senator Millard Tydings (Dem.) of Maryland and Representative John McDuffie (Dem.) of Alabama, and signed into law by President Franklin D. Roosevelt.

== Provisions ==
The Tydings–McDuffie Act specified a procedural framework for the drafting of a constitution for the government of the Commonwealth of the Philippines within two years of its enactment. The act specified a number of mandatory constitutional provisions, and required approval of the constitution by the U.S. president and by Filipinos. The act mandated U.S. recognition of independence of the Philippine Islands as a separate and self-governing nation after a ten-year transition period.

Prior to independence, the act allowed the U.S. to maintain military forces in the Philippines and to call all military forces of the Philippine government into U.S. military service. The act empowered the U.S. president, within two years following independence, to negotiate matters relating to U.S. naval reservations and fueling stations in the Philippine Islands.

=== Immigration ===
The act reclassified all Filipinos, including those who were living in the United States, as aliens for the purposes of immigration to the United States. A quota of 50 immigrants per year was established. Before this act, Filipinos were classified as United States nationals, but not United States citizens, and while they were allowed to migrate relatively freely, they were denied naturalization rights within the US unless they were citizens by birth in the mainland US.

== History ==
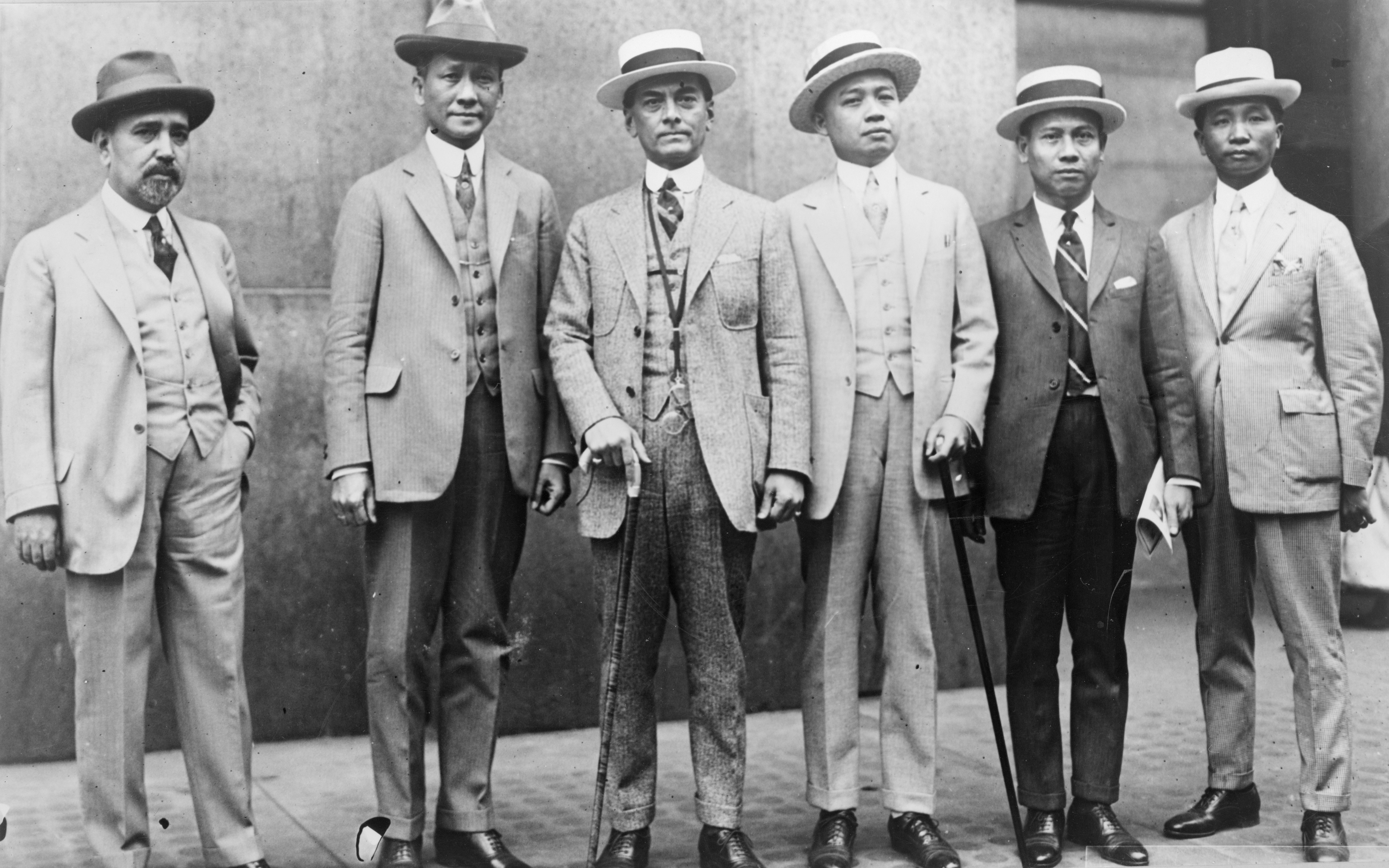
Representatives from the Philippine Independence Mission in 1924 (left to right): Isauro Gabaldón, Sergio Osmeña, Manuel L. Quezon, Claro M. Recto, Pedro Guevara, and Jorge Bocobo

An attempt to set a final date for Philippine independence was first manifested in the Hare-Hawes-Cutting Act of 1933. Though Congress passed it, overriding President Hoover's veto, it failed to create a concrete timeline for independence. Requiring the consent of the Philippine Senate for it to be implemented, the bill failed after the then-President of the Senate Manuel L. Quezon convinced his fellow senators to reject the bill because of the act's provision that would have allowed for the U.S. to station military bases in the islands permanently. Thus, it was necessary for Congress to draft a new bill to address these complaints and finally establish a timeline for the colony's independence.

In 1934, Quezon headed a "Philippine Independence mission" to Washington, D.C. It lobbied Congress and secured the act's passage.

In 1935, under the provisions of the act, the 1935 Constitution of the Philippines was drafted and became law, establishing the Commonwealth of the Philippines with an elected executive, the president of the Philippines. The Commonwealth was to be a transitional government lasting for a period of ten years, with independence to be granted on July 4, 1946.

Accordingly, President Harry S. Truman issued Proclamation 2695 of July 4, 1946, officially recognizing the independence of the Philippines.

=== Immigration quota ===
The immigration quota under the act was low, and immigration continued at levels much higher than the legal quota. This was due to the strength of agricultural lobbies, such as the Hawaiian sugar planters, which were able to successfully lobby the federal government to allow more male Filipino agricultural workers provided that they demonstrated a need. This further increased the Filipino population in Hawaii which had at one point been 25% of agricultural workers on the islands.

The act also led to the Filipino Repatriation Act.

This act extended the Asian-exclusion policy of the Immigration Act of 1924 to the soon-to-be-former territory. This policy hampered the domestic lives of many Filipinos within the US because any Filipino who wished to go to the Philippines and then return to the United States would be subject to the restrictions on Asian immigration to America and would likely never be allowed to return.

In 1946, the US decreased the tight restrictions of the Tydings–McDuffie Act with the Luce–Celler Act of 1946, which increased the quota of Filipino immigrants to 100 per year and gave Filipinos the right to become naturalized American citizens. Filipinos would have been barred from immigrating to the U.S. without the Act. Two days later, on July 4, 1946, the Philippines became independent with the signing of the Treaty of Manila.

== See also ==
- History of the Philippines (1898–1946)
- Philippine Organic Act (1902)
- Hare–Hawes–Cutting Act
