= List of senators of the Philippines who ran for president =

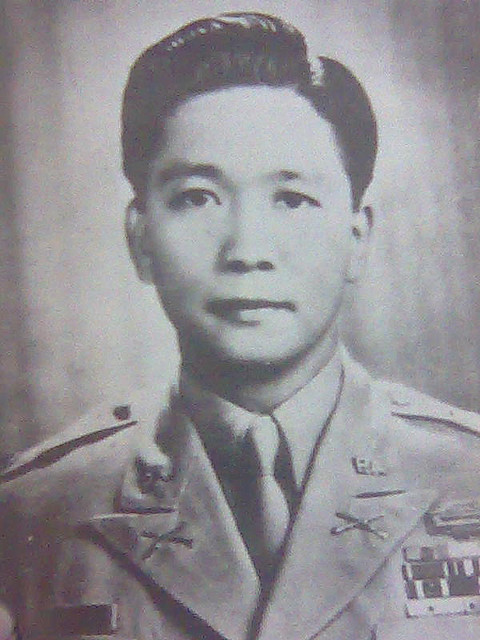
Ferdinand Marcos, the senator who has run the most times with 4 presidential runs.

Of the many officeholders who served as senator of the Philippines, only 28 individual senators have attempted to run for the presidency after being elected to the position. In summary, 39 presidential runs were from former or incumbent senators. Only nine were successfully elected or re-elected president.

The only presidents of the Philippines that were not senators before and after their presidency are Emilio Aguinaldo, Ramon Magsaysay, Diosdado Macapagal, Corazon Aquino, Fidel V. Ramos, and Rodrigo Duterte.

This list includes the following:

- incumbent senators;
- former senators; and
- vice president-turned-presidents that were former senators.

The 1973 Philippine martial law referendum and 1977 Philippine presidential referendums are excluded because they were referendums and not specifically presidential elections. The 2010 Philippine presidential election had the most senators running for President with 4 incumbent senators and 1 former senators, 5 senators overall.

As of November 2025, Panfilo Lacson is the only senator who has run for president that is still serving in the Senate.

== List of senators who ran for president ==
Senators with the numbers of their popular vote, percentage, and place in bold won the presidency.

Former senators have their names in italics.

Election Year	Senator (date of service as senator prior to presidential run)	Party/Coalition	Popular Vote	Percentage	Place	Served senator later?	Winner of election	Ref.
1935	Manuel L. Quezon (October 16, 1916 – November 15, 1935)	Nacionalista	**695,332**	**67.99%**	**1st**	**Became president**	Manuel L. Quezon	
1941	Manuel L. Quezon (Note: Incumbent president) (October 16, 1916 – November 15, 1935)	Nacionalista	**1,340,320**	**80.13%**	**1st**	**No, served president until his death in 1944**	Manuel L. Quezon	
1941	Juan Sumulong (June 5, 1934 – September 16, 1935)	Popular Front (Sumulong Wing)	298,608	17.85%	2nd	No, died in 1942	Manuel L. Quezon	
1943	Jose P. Laurel (June 2, 1925 – June 2, 1932)	KALIBAPI	**108 (Note: Elected by the National Assembly.)**	**100.00%**	**Unopposed**	**No, imprisoned until 1946 and granted amnesty by Manuel Roxas**	Himself	
1946	Manuel Roxas (July 9, 1945 – May 25, 1946)	Liberal	**1,333,006**	**53.93%**	**1st**	**No, served president until his death in 1948**	Manuel Roxas	
1946	Sergio Osmeña (June 6, 1922 – November 15, 1935)	Nacionalista	1,129,996	45.71%	2nd	No, retired	Manuel Roxas	
1949	Elpidio Quirino (June 9, 1945 – May 28, 1946)	Liberal	**1,803,808**	**50.93%**	**1st**	**Re-elected president**	Elpidio Quirino	
1949	Jose P. Laurel (June 2, 1925 – June 2, 1932)	Nacionalista	1,318,330	37.22%	2nd	Yes, elected senator in 1951	Elpidio Quirino	
1949	José Avelino (May 25, 1946 – December 30, 1951)	Liberal (Avelino Wing)	419,890	11.85%	3rd	Yes, served until 1951	Elpidio Quirino	
1953	Elpidio Quirino (June 9, 1945 – May 28, 1946)	Liberal	1,313,991	31.08%	2nd	No, retired	Ramon Magsaysay	
1957	Carlos P. Garcia (May 25, 1945 – December 30, 1953)	Nacionalista	**2,072,257**	**41.28%**	**1st**	**Re-elected president**	Carlos P. Garcia	
1957	José Yulo (June 9, 1945 – May 28, 1946)	Liberal	1,386,829	27.62%	2nd	No, retired	Carlos P. Garcia	
1957	Claro M. Recto (April 3, 1952 – October 2, 1960)	NCP	429,226	20.90%	4th	Yes, served until 1960	Carlos P. Garcia	
1961	Carlos P. Garcia (May 25, 1945 – December 30, 1953)	Nacionalista	3,187,752	42.88%	2nd	No, retired	Diosdado Macapagal	
1965	Ferdinand Marcos (December 30, 1959 – December 30, 1965)	Nacionalista	**3,861,324**	**51.94%**	**1st**	**Became president**	Ferdinand Marcos	
1965	Raul Manglapus (December 30, 1961 – December 30, 1967)	Progressive	384,564	5.17%	3rd	Yes, served until 1967	Ferdinand Marcos	
1969	Ferdinand Marcos (December 30, 1959 – December 30, 1965)	Nacionalista	**5,017,343**	**61.47**	**1st**	**Re-elected president**	Ferdinand Marcos	
1969	Sergio Osmeña Jr. (December 30, 1965 – December 30, 1971)	Liberal	3,143,122	38.51%	2nd	Yes, served until 1971	Ferdinand Marcos	
1981	Ferdinand Marcos (December 30, 1959 – December 30, 1965)	KBL	**18,309,360**	**88.02%**	**1st**	**Re-elected president**	Ferdinand Marcos	
1986	Ferdinand Marcos (December 30, 1959 – December 30, 1965)	KBL	6,532,362 (Note: This is the NAMFREL tally; the nullified COMELEC tally showed Marcos with 10,807,197 votes.)	47.71% (Note: This is the NAMFREL tally; the nullified COMELEC tally showed Marcos with 53.62%.)	2nd (Note: This is the NAMFREL tally; the nullified COMELEC tally showed Marcos beating Cory Aquino.)	No, removed from power and died in 1989	Corazon Aquino	
1992	Jovito Salonga (June 30, 1987 – June 30, 1992)	Liberal	2,302,123	10.16%	6th	No, retired	Fidel V. Ramos	
1998	Joseph Estrada (June 30, 1987 – June 30, 1992)	LAMMP	**10,722,295**	**39.86%**	**1st**	**No, resigned and arrested in 2001, later pardoned in 2007 by Gloria Macapagal Arroyo**	Joseph Estrada	
1998	Raul Roco (June 30, 1992 – February 2, 2001)	Aksyon	3,720,212	13.83%	3rd	Yes, served until 2001	Joseph Estrada	
1998	Miriam Defensor Santiago (June 30, 1995 – June 30, 2001)	PRP	727,206	2.96%	7th	Yes, served until 2001	Joseph Estrada	
1998	Juan Ponce Enrile (June 30, 1995 – June 30, 2001)	Independent	343,139	1.28%	8th	Yes, served until 2001	Joseph Estrada	
2004	Gloria Macapagal Arroyo (June 30, 1992 – June 30, 1998)	Lakas	**12,905,808**	**39.99%**	**1st**	**No, served president until 2010 and elected Representative for Pampanga's 2nd district**	Gloria Macapagal Arroyo	
2004	Panfilo Lacson (June 30, 2001 – June 30, 2013)	LDP (Aquino Wing)	3,510,080	10.88%	3rd	Yes, served until 2013	Gloria Macapagal Arroyo	
2004	Raul Roco (June 30, 1992 – February 2, 2001)	Aksyon	2,082,762	6.45%	4th	No, died in 2005	Gloria Macapagal Arroyo	
2010	Benigno Aquino III (June 30, 2007 – June 30, 2010)	Liberal	**15,208,678**	**42.08%**	**1st**	**No, served president until 2016 and retired**	Benigno Aquino III	
2010	Joseph Estrada (June 30, 1987 – June 30, 1992)	PMP	9,487,837	26.25%	2nd	No, elected Mayor of Manila in 2013	Benigno Aquino III	
2010	Manny Villar (June 30, 2001 – June 30, 2013)	Nacionalista	5,573,835	15.42%	3rd	Yes, served until 2013 and retired	Benigno Aquino III	
2010	Dick Gordon (June 30, 2004 – June 30, 2010)	Bagumbayan	501,727	1.39%	6th	Yes, failed attempt in 2013 but elected in 2016	Benigno Aquino III	
2010	Jamby Madrigal (June 30, 2004 – June 30, 2010)	Independent	46,489	0.13%	8th	No, failed comeback in 2013 and retired	Benigno Aquino III	
2016	Mar Roxas (June 30, 2004 – June 30, 2010)	Liberal	9,978,175	23.45%	2nd	No, failed comeback in 2019 and retired	Rodrigo Duterte	
2016	Grace Poe (June 30, 2013 – June 30, 2025)	Independent	9,100,991	21.39%	3rd	Yes, served until 2025	Rodrigo Duterte	
2016	Miriam Defensor Santiago (June 30, 2004 – June 30, 2016)	PRP	1,455,532	3.42%	5th	No, died in 2016	Rodrigo Duterte	
2022	Bongbong Marcos (June 30, 2010 – June 30, 2016)	PFP	**31,629,783**	**58.77%**	**1st**	**Incumbent president since 2022**	Bongbong Marcos	
2022	Manny Pacquiao (June 30, 2016 – June 30, 2022)	PROMDI	3,663,113	3.59%	3rd	No, failed comeback in 2025 and retired	Bongbong Marcos	
2022	Panfilo Lacson (June 30, 2016 – June 30, 2022)	Independent	892,375	1.66%	5th	Yes, incumbent senator since 2025	Bongbong Marcos	

== See also ==
- List of vice presidents of the Philippines who ran for president
- List of presidents of the Philippines
