= List of presidents of the Philippines by time in office =

This is a list of current and former presidents of the Philippines by time in office that consists of the 17 presidents in the history of the Philippines. The basis of the list is counted by the number of calendar days.

== Rank by time in office ==
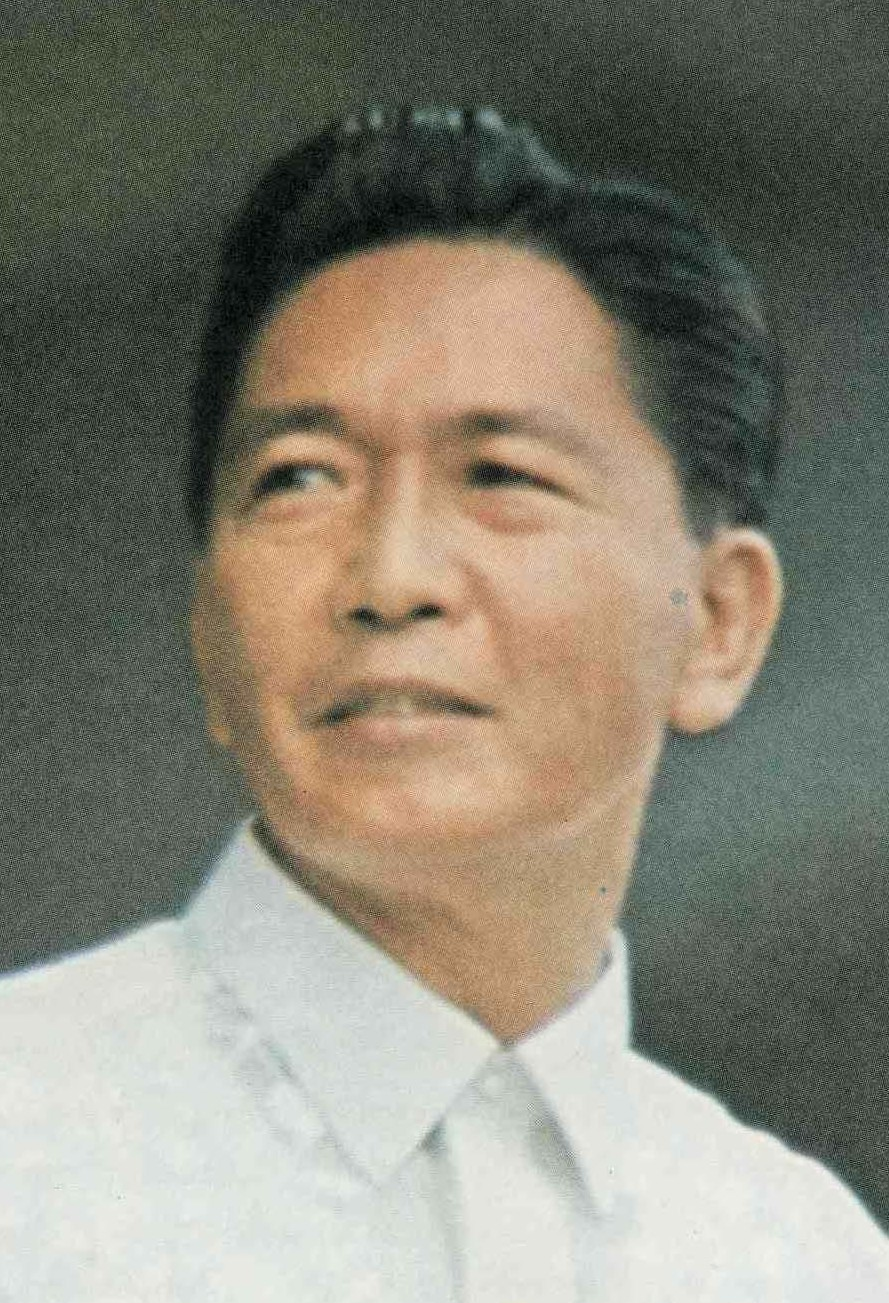
Ferdinand Marcos is the longest-serving president, having been in office for 20 years, 57 days (7,362 days). Due to Martial Law and subsequent political maneuvers, Marcos stayed in power until he was ousted in 1986. His extended rule as dictator lasted from 1972-1986, adding approx. 13 years to his tenure beyond what would have been a regular second term.

Updated daily according to UTC.

Rank	President	Length of term in days	Order of presidency	Number of terms
1	Ferdinand Marcos	7,362 days	10 • December 30, 1965 – February 25, 1986	Four full terms; ousted 4 years, 240 days into fifth term (Note: Ferdinand Marcos served one full four-year term from 1965 to 1969 under the amended 1935 Constitution. He declared martial law 2 years, 266 days into his second term. Marcos's term was then extended by referendum in 1973 and 1977. He was elected in 1981 to serve a six-year term until 1987 according to the 1973 Constitution, but was removed from power by the People Power Revolution in 1986.)
2	Gloria Macapagal Arroyo	3,448 days	14 • January 20, 2001 – June 30, 2010	Succeeded to one partial term, followed by one full term (Note: Gloria Macapagal Arroyo succeeded to the presidency after the Second EDSA Revolution in 2001, 2 years, 240 days into what would have been Joseph Estrada's six-year term, according to the 1987 Constitution. She was later elected in 2004 to serve a full six-year term.)
3	Manuel L. Quezon	3,182 days	2 • November 15, 1935 – August 1, 1944	One full term; died 2 years, 215 days into second term (Note: Manuel L. Quezon was elected in 1935 to serve a term set to end in 1941, initially set to six years without reelection, according to the original 1935 Constitution. Amendments made to the Constitution in 1940 allowed Quezon to seek a second term. He was later elected in 1941 to serve until 1943, but his term was further extended by the Joint Resolution No. 95 of the United States Congress due to the Japanese occupation of the Philippines in 1943. Quezon died in office in 1944.)
4	Corazon Aquino	2,317 days	11 • February 25, 1986 – June 30, 1992	One full term (Note: Corazon Aquino assumed the presidency after the People Power Revolution in 1986. She was eligible for, but did not seek, re-election in 1992.)
5	Benigno Aquino III	2,192 days	15 • June 30, 2010 – June 30, 2016	One full term (Note: Served one full six-year term, according to the 1987 Constitution.)
6 (tie)	Fidel V. Ramos	2,191 days	12 • June 30, 1992 – June 30, 1998	One full term
6 (tie)	Rodrigo Duterte	2,191 days	16 • June 30, 2016 – June 30, 2022	One full term
8	Elpidio Quirino	2,083 days	6 • April 17, 1948 – December 30, 1953	Succeeded to one partial term, followed by one full term (Note: Elpidio Quirino succeeded to the presidency after the death of Manuel Roxas in 1948, 1 year, 325 days into what would have been Roxas's four-year term ending in 1949, according to the amended 1935 Constitution. He was later elected in 1949 to serve a full four-year term.)
9	Carlos P. Garcia	1,748 days	8 • March 18, 1957 – December 30, 1961	Succeeded to one partial term, followed by one full term (Note: Carlos P. Garcia succeeded to the presidency after the death of Ramon Magsaysay in 1957, 3 years, 78 days into what would have been Magsaysay's four-year term, according to the amended 1935 Constitution. He was later elected in the same year to serve a full four-year term.)
10	Bongbong Marcos	1,470 days	17 • June 30, 2022 – present	Currently serving (Note: Elected to serve one full six-year term, according to the 1987 Constitution.)
11	Diosdado Macapagal	1,461 days	9 • December 30, 1961 – December 30, 1965	One full term (Note: Served one full four-year term, according to the amended 1935 Constitution.)
12	Ramon Magsaysay	1,173 days	7 • December 30, 1953 – March 17, 1957	One partial term; died 3 years, 77 days into term (Note: Ramon Magsaysay was elected in 1953 to serve a four-year term according to the amended 1935 Constitution, but died in office in 1957, 288 days before the end of his presidential term.)
13	Joseph Estrada	935 days	13 • June 30, 1998 – January 20, 2001	One partial term; removed from office 2 years, 235 days into term (Note: Joseph Estrada was elected in 1998 to serve a six-year term according to the 1987 Constitution but was ousted after the Second EDSA Revolution in 2001, 3 years, 162 days before the end of his presidential term.)
14	Emilio Aguinaldo	789 days	1 • January 23, 1899 – April 19, 1901	One partial term (Note: Emilio Aguinaldo was elected in 1899 to serve a four-year term according to the 1899 Constitution but was captured by American forces on March 23, 1901 during the Philippine–American War and took an oath of allegiance to the United States on April 19, 2 years before the end of his presidential term.)
15	Manuel Roxas	688 days	5 • May 28, 1946 – April 15, 1948	One partial term; died 1 year, 323 days into term (Note: Manuel Roxas was elected in 1946 to serve a four-year term according to the amended 1935 Constitution, but died in office in 1948, 1 year, 259 days before the end of his presidential term.)
16	Jose P. Laurel	673 days	3 • October 14, 1943 – August 17, 1945	One partial term; republic dissolved 1 year, 307 days into term (Note: Jose P. Laurel was elected in 1943 to serve a six-year term according to the 1943 Constitution, but declared the dissolution of the Second Philippine Republic 4 years, 39 days before the end of his presidential term.)
17	Sergio Osmeña	665 days	4 • August 1, 1944 – May 28, 1946	Succeeded to one partial term (Note: Sergio Osmeña succeeded to the presidency after the death of Manuel L. Quezon in 1935, 1 year, 300 days into what would have been Quezon's second term that was set to end in 1946 during the transition to an independent Philippine Republic.)

== Sources ==
- inq7.net
- pangulo.ph
- Count day
