= List of presidents of the Philippines =

Malacañang Palace in Manila is the official residence of the president. (Note: The president has three official residences, with the Malacañang Palace Complex as the principal abode and workplace. The others are Mansion House in Baguio, the official summer residence, and Malacañang of the South, the official residence in Davao City.) Built in 1750, it has become a prominent symbol of and metonym for the office.

Under the Constitution of the Philippines, the president of the Philippines (Filipino: Pangulo ng Pilipinas) is both the head of state and government, and serves as the commander-in-chief of the country's armed forces. The president is directly elected by qualified voters to a six-year term and must be "a natural-born citizen of the Philippines, a registered voter, able to read and write, at least forty years of age on the day of the election, and a resident of the Philippines for at least ten years immediately preceding such election". No elected president can seek re-election. Upon resignation, or removal from the office, the vice president assumes the post. A president's successor who hasn't served for more than four years can still seek a full term for the presidency.

The incumbent president is Bongbong Marcos, who assumed office on June 30, 2022.

== History ==
Emilio Aguinaldo became the inaugural president of the Philippines under the Malolos Republic, which was considered the First Philippine Republic. (Note: In chronological order, the presidents started with Manuel L. Quezon, who was then succeeded by Sergio Osmeña as the second president, until the recognition of Emilio Aguinaldo and José P. Laurel's presidencies in the 1960s. (Note: The Malolos Republic, an independent revolutionary state that is actually the first constitutional republic in Asia, remained unrecognized by any country until the Philippines acknowledged the government as its predecessor, which it also calls the First Philippine Republic. Aguinaldo was consequently counted as the country's first president.) (Note: The Second Republic was later declared by the Supreme Court of the Philippines as a de facto, illegitimate government on September 17, 1945. Its laws were considered null and void; despite this, Laurel was included in the official roster of Philippine presidents in the 1960s.) With Aguinaldo as the first president and Laurel as the third, Quezon and Osmeña are thus listed as the second and the fourth respectively.) He held that office until 1901 when he was captured by United States forces during the Philippine–American War (1899–1902). The American colonization of the Philippines abolished the First Republic, which led to an American governor-general exercising executive power.

In 1935, the United States, pursuant to its promise of full Philippine sovereignty, established the Commonwealth of the Philippines following the ratification of the 1935 Constitution, which also restored the presidency. The first national presidential election was held, (Note: Emilio Aguinaldo, the official first president, was elected indirectly by the Malolos Congress and not by popular vote.) and Manuel L. Quezon (1935–1944) was elected to a six-year term with no provision for re-election as the second Philippine president and the first Commonwealth president. In 1940, however, the Constitution was amended to allow re-election but shortened the term to four years. However, a change in the government occurred three years later when the Second Philippine Republic was organized with the enactment of the 1943 Constitution, which Japan imposed after the occupied the Philippines in 1942 during World War II. José P. Laurel acted as puppet president of the new Japanese-sponsored government; his de facto presidency, not legally recognized until the 1960s, overlapped with that of the president of the Commonwealth, which went into exile. The Second Republic was dissolved after the Japan surrendered to the Allies in 1945; the Commonwealth was then restored in the Philippines in the same year with the election of Sergio Osmeña (1944–1946) as president.

Manuel Roxas (1946–1948) then followed Osmeña when he won the first post-war election in 1946. He became the first president of the independent Philippines when the Commonwealth ended on July 4 of that year. The Third Republic was ushered in and would cover the administrations of the next five presidents, the last of which was Ferdinand Marcos (1965–1986), who performed a self-coup by imposing martial law in 1972. The dictatorship of Marcos saw the birth of the New Society (Filipino: Bagong Lipunan) and the Fourth Republic. His tenure lasted until 1986 when he was deposed in the People Power Revolution. The current constitution came into effect in 1987, marking the beginning of the Fifth Republic.

Of the individuals elected as president, three died in office: two of natural causes (Manuel L. Quezon and Manuel Roxas) and one in a plane crash (Ramon Magsaysay, 1953–1957). The longest-serving president is Ferdinand Marcos with 20 years and 57 days in office; he is the only president to have served more than two terms. The shortest is Sergio Osmeña, who spent 1 year and 300 days in office.

Two women have held the office: Corazon Aquino (1986–1992), who ascended to the presidency upon the successful People Power Revolution of 1986, and Gloria Macapagal Arroyo (2001–2010), who, as vice president, ascended to the presidency upon Estrada's resignation and was elected to a full six-year term in 2004.

== List of presidents ==
No.	Portrait	Name (Lifespan)	Term start	Term end	Term length	Party	Election	Vice president
1		Emilio Aguinaldo (1869–1964)	January 23, 1899	April 19, 1901 (Note: Emilio Aguinaldo took an oath of allegiance to the United States on April 19, 1901, after being captured by American forces in Palanan, Isabela on March 23.)	2 years, 86 days	Nonpartisan	1899 (Note: Elected by the Malolos Congress.)	None (Note: The 1899 Constitution did not provide for a vice president.)
Position abolished (Note: During this period, executive authority was held by American military governors from August 14, 1898 until July 1, 1902, and by American governors-general from July 4, 1901 until November 15, 1935. The president of the United States appointed both military governors and governors-general. Military governors were appointed using the president's powers as commander-in-chief, while governors-general were appointed with the advice and consent of the United States Senate.) (April 19, 1901 – November 15, 1935)
2		Manuel L. Quezon (Note: From October 14, 1943 until August 17, 1945, there were two presidencies of the Philippines: one for the Commonwealth of the Philippines under the United States and another for the Japanese-backed Second Philippine Republic. Two individuals served as president of the Commonwealth during this period: Manuel L. Quezon (until August 1, 1944) and Sergio Osmeña (from August 1, 1944). Jose P. Laurel was the only president of the Second Republic.) (1878–1944)	November 15, 1935	August 1, 1944 (Note: Died in office.)	8 years, 260 days	Nacionalista	1935	Sergio Osmeña
2		Manuel L. Quezon (1878–1944)	November 15, 1935	August 1, 1944	8 years, 260 days	Nacionalista	1941 (Note: Manuel L. Quezon's second term was supposed to end on December 30, 1943. However, Joint Resolution No. 95 of the United States Congress was approved on November 12, 1943, to extend Quezon's term due to the Japanese occupation of the Philippines.)	Sergio Osmeña
3		Jose P. Laurel (1891–1959)	October 14, 1943	August 17, 1945 (Note: Jose P. Laurel dissolved the Second Philippine Republic on August 17, 1945.)	1 year, 307 days	KALIBAPI	1943 (Note: Elected by the National Assembly.)	None (Note: The 1943 Constitution did not provide for a vice president.)
4		Sergio Osmeña (1878–1961)	August 1, 1944	May 28, 1946	1 year, 300 days	Nacionalista	— (Note: Succeeded to the presidency upon the death of the preceding president.)	None (Note: The 1935 Constitution did not provide for the filling of a vacancy in the vice presidency.)
5		Manuel Roxas (1892–1948)	May 28, 1946	April 15, 1948	1 year, 323 days	Liberal	1946	Elpidio Quirino
Vacant (April 15–17, 1948)								Elpidio Quirino
6		Elpidio Quirino (1890–1956)	April 17, 1948	December 30, 1953	5 years, 257 days	Liberal	—	None (until 1949)
6		Elpidio Quirino (1890–1956)	April 17, 1948	December 30, 1953	5 years, 257 days	Liberal	1949	Fernando Lopez (from 1949)
7		Ramon Magsaysay (1907–1957)	December 30, 1953	March 17, 1957	3 years, 77 days	Nacionalista	1953	Carlos P. Garcia
Vacant (March 17–18, 1957)								Carlos P. Garcia
8		Carlos P. Garcia (1896–1971)	March 18, 1957	December 30, 1961	4 years, 287 days	Nacionalista	—	None (until 1957)
8		Carlos P. Garcia (1896–1971)	March 18, 1957	December 30, 1961	4 years, 287 days	Nacionalista	1957	Diosdado Macapagal (from 1957)
9		Diosdado Macapagal (1910–1997)	December 30, 1961	December 30, 1965	4 years	Liberal	1961	Emmanuel Pelaez
10		Ferdinand Marcos (1917–1989)	December 30, 1965	February 25, 1986 (Note: Ferdinand Marcos fled the country on February 25, 1986, as a result of the People Power Revolution.)	20 years, 57 days	Nacionalista (until 1978)	1965	Fernando Lopez (until 1973)
10		Ferdinand Marcos (1917–1989)	December 30, 1965	February 25, 1986	20 years, 57 days	Nacionalista (until 1978)	1969	Fernando Lopez (until 1973)
10		Ferdinand Marcos (1917–1989)	December 30, 1965	February 25, 1986	20 years, 57 days	Nacionalista (until 1978)	1969	None (Note: The 1973 Constitution did not provide for a vice presidency.) (1973–1984)
10		Ferdinand Marcos (1917–1989)	December 30, 1965	February 25, 1986	20 years, 57 days	Nacionalista (until 1978)	1973 (Note: Ferdinand Marcos' term was extended through a referendum.)	None (1973–1984)
10		Ferdinand Marcos (1917–1989)	December 30, 1965	February 25, 1986	20 years, 57 days	Nacionalista (until 1978)	1977	None (1973–1984)
10		Ferdinand Marcos (1917–1989)	December 30, 1965	February 25, 1986	20 years, 57 days	KBL (from 1978)	1977	None (1973–1984)
10		Ferdinand Marcos (1917–1989)	December 30, 1965	February 25, 1986	20 years, 57 days	KBL (from 1978)	1981	None (1973–1984)
10		Ferdinand Marcos (1917–1989)	December 30, 1965	February 25, 1986	20 years, 57 days	KBL (from 1978)	1981	Vacant (Note: The 1973 Constitution was amended in 1981 to provide for a vice presidency. However, a vice presidential election was not called until 1986.) (from 1984)
11		Corazon Aquino (1933–2009)	February 25, 1986	June 30, 1992	6 years, 126 days	UNIDO (until 1987)	1986 (Note: In the 1986 presidential election, Ferdinand Marcos was declared the winner by the Batasang Pambansa based on the results from the Commission on Elections, while Corazon Aquino was declared the winner by the National Citizens' Movement for Free Elections. The fraudulent conduct and disputed result of the election led to the People Power Revolution, resulting in Marcos fleeing the country and Aquino's assumption of the presidency.)	Salvador Laurel
11		Corazon Aquino (1933–2009)	February 25, 1986	June 30, 1992	6 years, 126 days	Independent (from 1987)	1986	Salvador Laurel
12		Fidel V. Ramos (1928–2022)	June 30, 1992	June 30, 1998	6 years	Lakas	1992	Joseph Estrada
13		Joseph Estrada (born 1937)	June 30, 1998	January 20, 2001 (Note: Joseph Estrada was removed from office on January 20, 2001, as a result of the Second EDSA Revolution. The Supreme Court confirmed Estrada's resignation on March 2, 2001.)	2 years, 204 days	LAMMP	1998	Gloria Macapagal Arroyo
14		Gloria Macapagal Arroyo (born 1947)	January 20, 2001	June 30, 2010	9 years, 161 days	Lakas	— (Note: Gloria Macapagal Arroyo succeeded to the presidency on January 20, 2001, upon Joseph Estrada's removal from office as a result of the Second EDSA Revolution.)	Vacant (Note: The vice presidency was vacant from January 20 until February 7, 2001.) (until 2001)
14		Gloria Macapagal Arroyo (born 1947)	January 20, 2001	June 30, 2010	9 years, 161 days	Lakas	—	Teofisto Guingona Jr. (Note: Appointed as vice president in accordance with Section 9 of Article VII of the 1987 Constitution.) (2001–2004)
14		Gloria Macapagal Arroyo (born 1947)	January 20, 2001	June 30, 2010	9 years, 161 days	Lakas	2004	Noli de Castro (from 2004)
15		Benigno Aquino III (1960–2021)	June 30, 2010	June 30, 2016	6 years	Liberal	2010	Jejomar Binay
16		Rodrigo Duterte (born 1945)	June 30, 2016	June 30, 2022	6 years	PDP–Laban (Note: Rodrigo Duterte was briefly affiliated with the Pederalismo ng Dugong Dakilang Samahan in 2021.)	2016	Leni Robredo
17		Bongbong Marcos (born 1957)	June 30, 2022	Incumbent	4 years, 139 days	PFP	2022	Sara Duterte

== Living former presidents ==
Living former presidents showing periods in office with dates of birth and age and current position in government

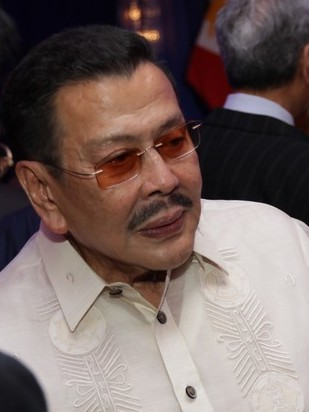
Joseph Estrada
(1998–2001)
April 19, 1937
None (retired)

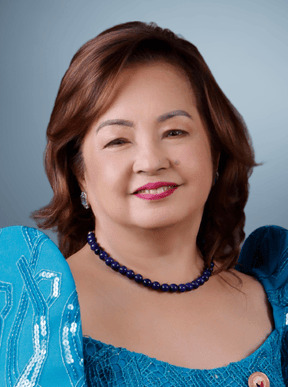
Gloria Macapagal Arroyo
(2001–2010)
April 5, 1947
Representative of Pampanga's 2nd district

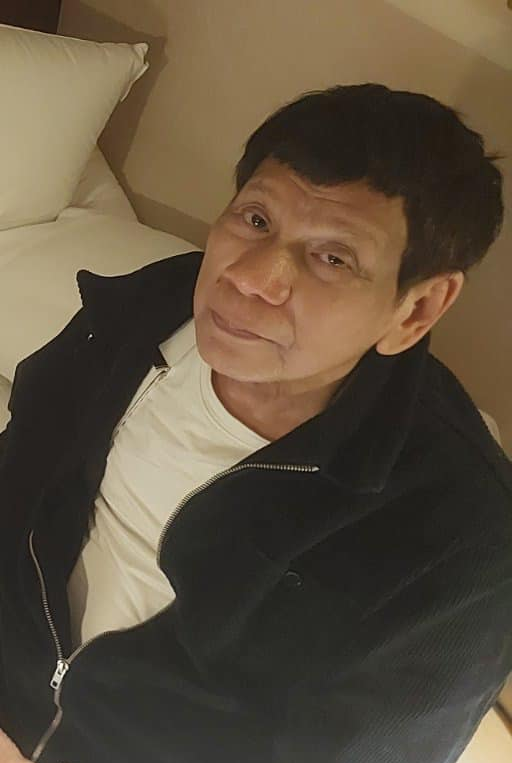
Rodrigo Duterte
(2016–2022)
March 28, 1945
None (Note: Duterte was elected as the Mayor of Davao City on May 12, 2025 during the 2025 Davao City local elections but was not able to get inaugurated on June 30, 2025 as he is currently detained at the United Nations Detention Unit, The Hague since March 11, 2025. Vice Mayor and son Sebastian Duterte served as Acting Mayor until January 23, 2026 in which Sebastian Duterte officially became mayor.)

== Unofficial presidents ==
Andrés Bonifacio is considered by some historians to be the first president of the Philippines. He was the third Supreme President (Spanish: Presidente Supremo; Tagalog: Kataastaasang Pangulo) of the Katipunan secret society. Its Supreme Council, led by the Supreme President, coordinated provincial and district councils. When the Katipunan went into open revolt in August 1896 (the Cry of Balintawak), Bonifacio transformed it into a revolutionary government with him as president. While the term Katipunan remained, Bonifacio's government was also known as the Tagalog Republic (Spanish: Republica Tagala; Tagalog: Republika ng Katagalugan). (Although the word Tagalog refers to a specific ethnicity, Bonifacio used it to denote all indigenous people in the Philippines in place of Filipino which had colonial origins.)

Some historians contend that including Bonifacio as a past president would imply that Macario Sakay and Miguel Malvar should also be included. Malvar continued Emilio Aguinaldo's leadership of the First Philippine Republic after the latter's capture until his own capture in 1902. Macario Sakay revived the Tagalog Republic in 1902 as a continuation of Bonifacio's Katipunan. They are still both considered by some scholars as "unofficial presidents". Along with Bonifacio, Malvar and Sakay are not recognized as presidents by the Philippine government.

Emilio Aguinaldo is officially recognized as the first president of the Philippines, but this is based on his term of office during the Malolos Republic, later known as the First Philippine Republic. Prior to this Aguinaldo had held the presidency of several revolutionary governments which are not counted in the succession of Philippine republics.

Manuel L. Quezon delegated his presidential duties to José Abad Santos, the then-Chief Justice, when the former fled the Philippines amidst Japanese occupation of the islands to establish a government-in-exile. He is believed to have in effect become the acting president of the Philippine Commonwealth though no legal document has been retrieved detailing the official transfer of the title of President to Abad Santos.

=== List ===
Portrait	Name (Lifespan)	Term start	Term end	Term length	Party	Election	Vice president	Government
	Andrés Bonifacio (1863–1897)	August 24, 1896 (Note: Term began when Bonifacio declared the establishment of the Tagalog Republic.)	March 22, 1897 (Note: Term ended after the Tejeros Convention.) or May 10, 1897 (Note: Executed for treason by Aguinaldo's government; Bonifacio did not recognize its validity and still acted as president.)	210 days or 259 days	Nonpartisan	—	None	Sovereign Tagalog Nation
	Emilio Aguinaldo (1869–1964)	March 22, 1897 (Note: Term was established at the Tejeros Convention; Aguinaldo took his oath of office the day after (March 23), but did not fully assume the office until late April 1897.)	November 1, 1897 (Note: Term ended with the establishment of the Republic of Biak-na-Bato.)	224 days	Nonpartisan	1897	Mariano Trias	Tejeros Revolutionary Government
	Emilio Aguinaldo (1869–1964)	November 2, 1897 (Note: Term began after the establishment of the Republic of Biak-na-Bato.)	December 14, 1897 (Note: Term ended when Aguinaldo signed the Pact of Biak-na-Bato.)	42 days	Nonpartisan	—	Mariano Trias	Republic of Biak-na-Bato
	Emilio Aguinaldo (1869–1964)	May 24, 1898	June 23, 1898 (Note: Term ended when Aguinaldo shifted from dictatorial to revolutionary government.)	30 days	Nonpartisan	—	Mariano Trias	Dictatorial Government
	Emilio Aguinaldo (1869–1964)	June 23, 1898 (Note: Term began with the declaration of a revolutionary government replacing the dictatorship.)	January 23, 1899 (Note: Term ended with the inauguration of the First Philippine Republic.)	214 days	Nonpartisan	—	Mariano Trias	Revolutionary Government
	Francisco Makabulos (1871–1922)	April 17, 1898	May 19, 1898 (Note: Term ended upon the return of Aguinaldo, who established a dictatorship.)	32 days	Nonpartisan	—	None	Central Executive Committee
	Miguel Malvar (1865–1911)	April 19, 1901 (Note: Term began when Malvar presumptively assumed the presidency after the declaration of Aguinaldo to the United States.)	April 16, 1902 (Note: Term ended when Malvar surrendered in Batangas.)	362 days	Nonpartisan	—	None (Note: The constitution at this time did not create an office of the vice president.)	First Republic
	Macario Sakay (1870–1907)	May 6, 1902 (Note: Term began when Sakay declared the establishment of the Tagalog Republic (in the tradition of Bonifacio instead of Aguinaldo).)	July 14, 1906 (Note: Term ended when Sakay surrendered as part of an amnesty; he was executed a year later.)	4 years, 69 days	Katipunan (Holdout/revival)	—	Francisco Carreón	Tagalog Republic
	José Abad Santos (1886–1942)	March 17, 1942	May 1, 1942	45 days	Independent	—	None	Commonwealth
	Jorge B. Vargas (1890–1980)	January 23, 1942	October 14, 1943	1 year, 264 days	KALIBAPI	—	None	Philippine Executive Commission
	Arturo Tolentino (1910–2004)	July 6, 1986 (Note: The running-mate of former President Ferdinand Marcos in the February 1986 presidential election. Proclaimed himself as acting president in a coup attempt.)	July 8, 1986	2 days	KBL	1986	None	Fourth Republic

== Notes ==
Subnotes

Other notes

== See also ==
- List of vice presidents of the Philippines
