= Presidential elections in the Philippines =

Selection of the Southeast Asian country's head of state

This list of presidential elections in the Philippines includes election results of both presidential and vice presidential elections since 1899 with the candidates' political party and their corresponding percentage.

The offices of the president and vice president are elected separately; hence a voter may split their vote. The candidate with the highest number of votes wins the position.

There had been 17 direct presidential elections in history: 1935, 1941, 1946, 1949, 1953, 1957, 1961, 1965, 1969, 1981, 1986, 1992, 1998, 2004, 2010, 2016 and 2022. When referring to "presidential elections", these 17 are usually the ones being referred to. All of these also included vice presidential elections, except for 1981.

There had also been two indirect elections: 1899 and 1943. Both were elected by the legislature (The Malolos Congress in 1899 and the National Assembly in 1943), and both resulted in unanimous and uncontested votes.

There had been two presidential referendums, in July 1973 and 1977. All in all, there had been 21 presidential ballots in Philippine history.

Since 1992, the elections have been held on the second Monday of May and every six years thereafter. The next presidential and vice presidential elections are in May 2028.

== History ==
During the Philippine Revolution, several leadership elections for the Katipunan were later on described as precursors of presidential elections. One example of this is the Tejeros Convention of 1897, where Emilio Aguinaldo successfully removed erstwhile Katipunan leader Andres Bonifacio. From that point on, it was Aguinaldo who would lead the revolution, declare independence from Spain, and convened the Malolos Congress. The Malolos Congress elected Aguinaldo as president on January 1, 1899, passed a constitution on January 22, and Aguinaldo and the First Republic was inaugurated on January 23, 1899. The First Republic existed until Aguinaldo's capture by the Americans on March 23, 1901.

The first presidential election by popular vote was on September 15, 1935, after the ratification of the 1935 Constitution of the Philippines; Manuel Quezon of the Nacionalista Party emerged as the victor, defeating previous president Emilio Aguinaldo (Aguinaldo was elected president by the Malolos Congress). As a commonwealth then of the United States, the constitution decreed that the president shall have one term of six years without reelection. In 1940, it was amended to allow one reelection, but with the term shortened to four years; this setup was first used in the second election in 1941 with Quezon being reelected.

However, World War II intervened and thus suspended the elections of 1945. The Empire of Japan set up the Second Philippine Republic that elected José P. Laurel as president by the National Assembly in 1943. After the Japanese were defeated, Congress rescheduled the much-delayed election in 1946. Manuel Roxas of the newly formed Liberal Party won the election a few weeks prior to the granting of independence by the United States. In 1949, the first election for the newly independent republic was held with President Elpidio Quirino winning; Quirino succeeded Roxas, who died while in office. Thereafter, elections were held every four years every second Tuesday of November of the election year, with the winning president and vice president inaugurated on December 30 succeeding the election. The alternation between the Nacionalistas and the Liberals characterized an apparent two-party system of the Third Republic.

In the operation of the 1935 constitution, there were nine presidential elections; excluding the first election where there were no incumbents, the incumbent was beaten four times (1946, 1953, 1961, 1965), the incumbent won upon ascending to the presidency from a vacancy twice (1949, 1957), and two incumbents won a second term after being elected to a first term as president (1941, 1969).

In 1972, President Ferdinand Marcos declared martial law and ruled by decree. At this time, a new constitution was ratified in 1973 in which the office of the vice president being abolished. and that the president shall be elected by the National Assembly amongst themselves, although once elected, the president will cease to be a member of the National Assembly and any political party (similar to the British Speaker of the House of Commons). With the members of the National Assembly having no term limits, the president may serve indefinitely. Before parliament was elected referendums in 1973 and 1977 affirmed that Marcos will stay as president and prime minister even after parliament has been organized.

In 1981, via constitutional amendment, the president is again elected via popular vote, with a term of office of six years starting at the thirtieth of June of the year of the election. In the succeeding election on June 16, 1981 (third Monday of June); Marcos was again elected, with much of the opposition boycotting the election. In addition, the amendment also renamed the National Assembly into its Filipino translation as "Batasang Pambansa." In 1984, another amendment reinstated the office of the vice president. The election of the vice president is similar to the United States presidential election, in which a vote for the president is also a vote for the vice president, although this was later changed to a separate vote for each position. Marcos' Kilusang Bagong Lipunan (New Society Movement or KBL) won every presidential election of the Fourth Republic until 1986.

In 1986, Marcos called for an early or "snap" election (the next scheduled election was in 1987) and was, including his running mate Arturo Tolentino, declared the winners. The People Power Revolution erupted that drove Marcos out of power, and Corazon Aquino, the runner-up, assumed the presidency. A new constitution was ratified in 1987 that was essentially identical with the provisions of the amended 1973 constitution as long as the election of the president and vice president is concerned, with the presidential election occurring at the second Monday of May and the inauguration every June 30 of the election year. The 1992 election was the first election under the new constitution and elections are held every six years thereafter. Fidel V. Ramos won the 1992 election with just 23% of the vote, the lowest plurality in history; it also ushered in the multi-party system of the Fifth Republic. Thereafter, no winner has won via a majority, although each has had an increasing percentage of votes with every succeeding election. Joseph Estrada won in 1998 in what was described as landslide, getting just under 40% of the votes, while second place Jose de Venecia getting 16%. President Gloria Macapagal Arroyo, who succeeded Estrada at the outcome of the 2001 EDSA Revolution, was the first sitting president to run, and defeated Fernando Poe, Jr. in the closest margin in history. Benigno Aquino III won in 2010 with 42% of the vote in what was also called as a landslide, defeating Estrada who had 26% of the vote, and seven others. Rodrigo Duterte won with just under 40% of the vote, but with a 14% margin of victory from second-placer Mar Roxas in 2016. In the 2022 election, under the Partido Federal ng Pilipinas (PFP), Bongbong Marcos won by a landslide and received nearly 59% of the votes, becoming the first to be elected by a majority since the establishment of the Fifth Republic in 1986.

In the operation of the 1987 constitution, incumbents who have in office for more than four years are barred to defend their seats, but all but one (1992) candidate endorsed by the incumbent lost, and one defended the seat after ascending to the presidency (2004).

=== Summary ===
Manner of election		Constitution	Term of service	Reelection	Election day	Inauguration	Elections implemented
President	Vice president	Constitution	Term of service	Reelection	Election day	Inauguration	Elections implemented
Majority of the members of the Malolos Congress	none	Malolos Constitution	Four years	None	January 1	January 23	1899
Popular vote	Popular vote	1935 Constitution	Six years	No	Second Tuesday of November	December 30	1935
Popular vote	Popular vote	1935 Constitution as amended	Four years	Once	Second Tuesday of November	December 30	1941, 1946, 1949, 1953, 1957, 1961, 1965, 1969
Majority of the members of the National Assembly	none	1943 Constitution	Six years	No	varies	December 30	1943
Majority of the members of the National Assembly	none	1973 Constitution	Six years	Unlimited	varies	"Not be later than three days after his proclamation by the National Assembly, nor in any case earlier than the expiration of the term of his predecessor"	None
Popular vote	none	1973 Constitution as amended	Six years	Unlimited	Second Tuesday of June	June 30	1981
Popular vote	Together with the president	1973 Constitution as amended	Six years	Unlimited	As provided by law	June 30	None
Popular vote	Popular vote	1973 Constitution as amended	Six years	Unlimited	As provided by law	June 30	None
Popular vote	Popular vote	Batas Pambansa Bilang 883	Six years	Unlimited	February 7, 1986	"Ten days after proclamation by the Batasang Pambansa" (February 25, 1986)	1986
Popular vote	Popular vote	1987 Constitution	Six years	No for the incumbent president	Second Monday of May	June 30	1992, 1998, 2004, 2010, 2016, 2022

== Results summary ==
- Boldface: Incumbent
- Italics: Nominee of the ruling party, or supported by the incumbent
- Only candidates from third parties whose votes surpassed the margin between the winner and the best loser are included.

Year	Type	President-elect	Incumbent won?	Total candidates	Vice president-elect	Incumbent won?	Total candidates	Winners came from the same ticket?
1899	Indirect	Emilio Aguinaldo	—N/a	1	—N/a	—N/a	—N/a	—N/a
1935	Direct	Manuel L. Quezon	—N/a	3	Sergio Osmeña	—N/a	3	Yes
1941	Direct	Manuel L. Quezon	Yes	8	Sergio Osmeña	Yes	5	Yes
1943	Indirect	Jose P. Laurel	—N/a	1	—N/a	—N/a	—N/a	—N/a
1946	Direct	Manuel Roxas	No	3	Elpidio Quirino	—N/a	3	Yes
1949	Direct	Elpidio Quirino	Yes	3	Fernando Lopez	—N/a	3	Yes
1953	Direct	Ramon Magsaysay	No	3	Carlos P. Garcia	No	2	Yes
1957	Direct	Carlos P. Garcia	Yes	7	Diosdado Macapagal	—N/a	5	No
1961	Direct	Diosdado Macapagal	No	6	Emmanuel Pelaez	No	4	Yes
1965	Direct	Ferdinand Marcos	No	12	Fernando Lopez	No	6	Yes
1969	Direct	Ferdinand Marcos	Yes	12	Fernando Lopez	Yes	4	Yes
1973	Referendum	Ferdinand Marcos	Yes	—N/a	—N/a	—N/a	—N/a	—N/a
1977	Referendum	Ferdinand Marcos	Yes	—N/a	—N/a	—N/a	—N/a	—N/a
1981	Direct	Ferdinand Marcos	Yes	13	—N/a	—N/a	—N/a	—N/a
1986	Direct	Ferdinand Marcos	Yes	4	Arturo Tolentino	—N/a	4	Yes
1992	Direct	Fidel V. Ramos	No	7	Joseph Estrada	No	7	No
1998	Direct	Joseph Estrada	No	10	Gloria Macapagal Arroyo	No	9	No
2004	Direct	Gloria Macapagal Arroyo	Yes	5	Noli de Castro	No	4	Yes
2010	Direct	Benigno Aquino III	No	9	Jejomar Binay	No	8	No
2016	Direct	Rodrigo Duterte	No	5	Leni Robredo	No	6	No
2022	Direct	Bongbong Marcos	No	10	Sara Duterte	No	9	Yes

=== For president ===
Year	President-elect			Losing candidates*						Valid votes
Year	Candidate	Votes	%	Candidate	Votes	%	Candidate(s)	Votes	%	Valid votes
1935	Manuel L. Quezon	695,332	67.99%	Emilio Aguinaldo	179,349	17.53%	2 others	148,168	14.49%	1,022,849
1941	**Manuel L. Quezon**	1,340,320	80.14%	Juan Sumulong	298,608	17.85%	6 others	33,278	1.99%	1,638,928
1946	Manuel Roxas	1,333,392	53.93%	**Sergio Osmeña**	1,051,243	45.72%	1 other	8,538	0.35%	2,471,538
1949	**Elpidio Quirino**	1,803,808	50.93%	Jose P. Laurel	1,318,330	37.22%	1 other	419,890	11.85%	3,542,018
1953	Ramon Magsaysay	2,912,992	68.90%	**Elpidio Quirino**	1,313,991	31.08%	1 other	736	0.02%	4,227,719
1957	**Carlos P. Garcia**	2,072,257	41.28%	José Yulo	1,386,829	27.62%	Manuel Manahan	1,049,420	20.90%	5,020,204
1957	**Carlos P. Garcia**	2,072,257	41.28%	José Yulo	1,386,829	27.62%	4 others	511,698	10.19%	5,020,204
1961	Diosdado Macapagal	3,554,840	55.05%	**Carlos P. Garcia**	2,902,996	44.95%	4 others	11	<0.01%	6,457,817
1965	Ferdinand Marcos	3,861,324	51.94%	**Diosdado Macapagal**	3,187,752	42.88%	10 others	385,355	5.18%	7,434,431
1969	**Ferdinand Marcos**	5,017,343	61.47%	Sergio Osmeña Jr.	3,143,122	38.51%	10 others	1,339	0.02%	8,061,804
1973 referendum	**Ferdinand Marcos** ("yes")	17,653,200	90.67%	"No"	1,856,744	9.33%				19,908,760
1977 referendum	**Ferdinand Marcos** ("yes")	20,062,782	89.27%	"No"	2,104,209	9.37%				24,094,227
1981	**Ferdinand Marcos**	18,309,360	88.02%	Alejo Santos	1,716,449	8.25%	11 others	775,594	3.73%	20,801,403
1986	**Ferdinand Marcos**	10,807,197	53.62%	Corazon Aquino	9,291,761	46.10%	2 others	57,693	0.29%	20,156,606
1992	Fidel V. Ramos	5,342,521	23.58%	Miriam Defensor Santiago	4,468,173	19.72%	Danding Cojuangco	4,116,376	18.17%	22,654,195
1992	Fidel V. Ramos	5,342,521	23.58%	Miriam Defensor Santiago	4,468,173	19.72%	Ramon Mitra Jr.	3,316,661	14.64%	22,654,195
1992	Fidel V. Ramos	5,342,521	23.58%	Miriam Defensor Santiago	4,468,173	19.72%	Imelda Marcos	2,338,294	10.32%	22,654,195
1992	Fidel V. Ramos	5,342,521	23.58%	Miriam Defensor Santiago	4,468,173	19.72%	Jovito Salonga	2,302,124	10.16%	22,654,195
1992	Fidel V. Ramos	5,342,521	23.58%	Miriam Defensor Santiago	4,468,173	19.72%	1 other	770,046	3.40%	22,654,195
1998	Joseph Estrada	10,722,295	39.86%	Jose de Venecia Jr.	4,258,483	15.87%	8 others	11,911,758	44.28%	26,902,536
2004	**Gloria Macapagal Arroyo**	12,905,808	39.99%	Fernando Poe Jr.	11,782,232	36.51%	Panfilo Lacson	3,510,080	10.88%	32,269,100
2004	**Gloria Macapagal Arroyo**	12,905,808	39.99%	Fernando Poe Jr.	11,782,232	36.51%	Raul Roco	2,082,762	6.45%	32,269,100
2004	**Gloria Macapagal Arroyo**	12,905,808	39.99%	Fernando Poe Jr.	11,782,232	36.51%	Eddie Villanueva	1,988,218	6.16%	32,269,100
2010	Benigno Aquino III	15,208,678	42.08%	Joseph Estrada	9,487,837	26.25%	7 others	11,442,587	31.66%	36,139,102
2016	Rodrigo Duterte	16,601,997	39.01%	Mar Roxas	9,978,175	23.45%	Grace Poe	9,100,991	21.39%	42,552,835
2016	Rodrigo Duterte	16,601,997	39.01%	Mar Roxas	9,978,175	23.45%	2 others	6,871,672	16.15%	42,552,835
2022	Bongbong Marcos	31,629,783	58.77%	Leni Robredo	15,035,773	27.94%	8 others	7,149,928	13.28%	53,815,484

=== For vice president ===
Year	Vice president-elect			Losing candidates*						Valid votes
Year	Candidate	Votes	%	Candidate	Votes	%	Candidate(s)	Votes	%	Valid votes
1935	Sergio Osmeña	812,352	86.91%	Raymundo Melliza	70,899	7.59%	1 other	51,443	5.50%	934,694
1941	**Sergio Osmeña**	1,445,897	81.78%	Emilio Javier	124,035	7.90%	3 others	32,271	2.01%	1,569,932
1946	Elpidio Quirino	1,161,725	52.36%	Eulogio Rodriguez	1,051,243	47.38%	1 other	5,879	0.26%	2,218,847
1949	Fernando Lopez	1,741,302	51.67%	Manuel Briones	1,184,215	35.14%	1 other	444,550	13.19%	3,370,067
1953	Carlos P. Garcia	2,515,265	62.90%	José Yulo	1,483,802	37.10%				3,999,067
1957	Diosdado Macapagal	2,189,197	46.55%	Jose Laurel Jr.	1,783,012	37.92%	3 others	730,269	15.53%	4,702,478
1961	Emmanuel Pelaez	2,394,400	37.57%	Sergio Osmeña Jr.	2,190,424	34.37%	Gil Puyat	1,787,987	28.06%	6,372,813
1961	Emmanuel Pelaez	2,394,400	37.57%	Sergio Osmeña Jr.	2,190,424	34.37%	1 other	2	<0.01%	6,372,813
1965	Fernando Lopez	3,531,550	51.94%	Gerardo Roxas	3,504,826	48.11%	Manuel Manahan	247,426	3.40%	7,284,811
1965	Fernando Lopez	3,531,550	51.94%	Gerardo Roxas	3,504,826	48.11%	3 others	1,009	0.01%	7,284,811
1969	**Fernando Lopez**	5,001,737	62.75%	Genaro Magsaysay	2,968,526	37.24%	2 others	390	<0.01%	7,970,653
1986	Arturo Tolentino	10,134,130	50.66%	Salvador Laurel	9,173,105	45.85%	2 others	698,159	3.49%	20,005,394
1992	Joseph Estrada	6,739,738	33.01%	Marcelo Fernan	4,438,494	21.74%	Lito Osmeña	3,362,467	16.47%	22,654,195
1992	Joseph Estrada	6,739,738	33.01%	Marcelo Fernan	4,438,494	21.74%	Ramon Magsaysay Jr.	2,900,556	14.20%	22,654,195
1992	Joseph Estrada	6,739,738	33.01%	Marcelo Fernan	4,438,494	21.74%	3 others	2,978,914	14.59%	22,654,195
1998	Gloria Macapagal Arroyo	12,667,252	49.56%	Edgardo Angara	5,652,068	22.11%	7 others	7,239,949	28.32%	25,559,269
2004	Noli de Castro	15,100,431	49.80%	Loren Legarda	14,218,709	46.89%	Herminio Aquino	981,500	3.24%	30,322,884
2004	Noli de Castro	15,100,431	49.80%	Loren Legarda	14,218,709	46.89%	1 other	22,244	0.07%	30,322,884
2010	Jejomar Binay	14,645,574	41.65%	Mar Roxas	13,918,490	39.58%	Loren Legarda	4,294,664	12.21%	35,165,531
2010	Jejomar Binay	14,645,574	41.65%	Mar Roxas	13,918,490	39.58%	Bayani Fernando	1,017,631	2.89%	35,165,531
2010	Jejomar Binay	14,645,574	41.65%	Mar Roxas	13,918,490	39.58%	Edu Manzano	807,728	2.30%	35,165,531
2010	Jejomar Binay	14,645,574	41.65%	Mar Roxas	13,918,490	39.58%	3 others	481,444	1.37%	35,165,531
2016	Leni Robredo	14,418,817	35.11%	Bongbong Marcos	14,155,344	34.47%	Alan Peter Cayetano	5,903,379	14.38%	41,066,884
2016	Leni Robredo	14,418,817	35.11%	Bongbong Marcos	14,155,344	34.47%	Francis Escudero	4,931,962	12.01%	41,066,884
2016	Leni Robredo	14,418,817	35.11%	Bongbong Marcos	14,155,344	34.47%	Antonio Trillanes	868,501	2.11%	41,066,884
2016	Leni Robredo	14,418,817	35.11%	Bongbong Marcos	14,155,344	34.47%	Gregorio Honasan	788,881	1.92%	41,066,884
2022	Sara Duterte	32,208,417	61.53%	Francis Pangilinan	9,329,207	17.82%	7 others	10,808,376	20.65%	52,346,000

=== Graphical ===
==== For president ====
Year	Result	Valid votes	Turnout
1935	68% / 18% / 14%	99%	—N/a
1941	80% / 18%	—N/a	—N/a
1946	55% / 46%	90%	95%
1949	51% / 37% / 12%	99%	70%
1953	69% / 31%	98%	77%
1957	41% / 28% / 21% / 9%	98%	76%
1961	55% / 45%	96%	79%
1965	52% / 43% / 5%	98%	76%
1969	61% / 39%	98%	80%
1981	88% / 8%	95%	81%
1986	54% / 46%	97%	79%
1992	24% / 20% / 18% / 15% / 10% / 10%	93%	76%
1998	40% / 16% / 14% / 12% / 9%	92%	87%
2004	40% / 37% / 11% / 6% / 6%	96%	76%
2010	42% / 26% / 15% / 11%	95%	74%
2016	39% / 23% / 21%} / 13%	95%	81%
2022	59% / 28% / 7%	96%	83%

==== For vice president ====
Year	Result	Valid votes	Turnout
1935	87% / 8% / 6%	99%	—N/a
1941	90% / 8%	—N/a	—N/a
1946	53% / 47%	85%	90%
1949	52% / 35% / 14%	94%	70%
1953	63% / 37%	92%	77%
1957	46% / 38% / 8% / 7%	92%	76%
1961	38% / 34% / 28%	95%	79%
1965	48% / 48%	98%	76%
1969	63% / 37%	97%	80%
1981	—N/a	—N/a	—N/a
1986	51% / 46%	97%	79%
1992	33%} / 22% / 16% / 14% / 10%	84%	76%
1998	50% / 22% / 13% / 9%	87%	87%
2004	50% / 47%	90%	76%
2010	42% / 40% / 12%	92%	74%
2016	35% / 34% / 14% / 12%	91%	81%
2022	62% / 18% / 16%	93%	83%

== Incumbent president running for re-election ==
Based on the 1935 constitution, from 1935 to 1940, the incumbent president is eligible for one six-year term and cannot be reelected.

In 1940, a plebiscite approved an amendment that set a four-year term for a president, and that a president can be re-elected, but cannot serve for more than an amount of time that is worth two full terms (eight years).

In 1973, a plebiscite adopted a new constitution that abolished term limits, and set up a six-year term for the president.

In 1987, a plebiscite approved a new constitution that set a six-year term with no re-election for the incumbent. A vice president who became president cannot be elected as president if that person served as president for more than four years. As the incumbent president at that time was elected under the 1973 constitution, she was allowed to run anew but chose not to.

Year	Incumbent president	Eligible to run?	Ran for president?	Ran for another position?	Won?
1941	Manuel L. Quezon	Yes	Yes	—N/a	Yes
1946	Sergio Osmeña	Yes	Yes	—N/a	No
1949	Elpidio Quirino	Yes	Yes	—N/a	Yes
1953	Elpidio Quirino	Yes	Yes	—N/a	No
1957	Carlos P. Garcia	Yes	Yes	—N/a	Yes
1961	Carlos P. Garcia	Yes	Yes	—N/a	No
1965	Diosdado Macapagal	Yes	Yes	—N/a	No
1969	Ferdinand Marcos	Yes	Yes	—N/a	Yes
1981	Ferdinand Marcos	Yes	Yes	—N/a	Yes
1986	Ferdinand Marcos	Yes	Yes	—N/a	Disputed
1992	Corazon Aquino	Yes	No	No	—N/a
1998	Fidel V. Ramos	No	—N/a	No	—N/a
2004	Gloria Macapagal Arroyo	Yes	Yes	No	Yes
2010	Gloria Macapagal Arroyo	No	—N/a	Yes, congresswoman	Yes
2016	Benigno Aquino III	No	—N/a	No	—N/a
2022	Rodrigo Duterte	No	—N/a	No	—N/a

Every president who is eligible to run for president ran again, except in 1992 where Corazon Aquino did not run.

Vice presidents who became president upon vacancy of the latter office ran four times, and won as presidents in their own right in 1949, 1957 and 2004, and lost In 1946.

== Incumbent vice president running for president ==
In 1946, 1949 and 1957, no vice president was in office due to the erstwhile officeholder becoming president upon death of the president, and that there was no constitutional mechanism to fill up the office upon vacancy.

In 1981, the constitution had by then abolished the office of the vice president. It was reinstated upon a plebiscite in 1984, and the vice presidency was first elected in 1986.

Year	Incumbent vice president	Ran for president?	Ran for vice president?	Ran for another position?	Did not pursue office?	Incumbent won election?
1941	Sergio Osmeña	No	Yes	—N/a	—N/a	Yes
1946	None	—N/a	—N/a	—N/a	—N/a	—N/a
1949	None	—N/a	—N/a	—N/a	—N/a	—N/a
1953	Fernando Lopez	No	No	Yes, senator	—N/a	Yes
1957	None	—N/a	—N/a	—N/a	—N/a	—N/a
1961	Diosdado Macapagal	Yes	—N/a	—N/a	—N/a	Yes
1965	Emmanuel Pelaez	No	No	Yes, congressman	—N/a	Yes
1969	Fernando Lopez	No	Yes	—N/a	—N/a	Yes
1981	None	—N/a	—N/a	—N/a	—N/a	—N/a
1986	None	—N/a	—N/a	—N/a	—N/a	—N/a
1992	Salvador Laurel	Yes	—N/a	—N/a	—N/a	No
1998	Joseph Estrada	Yes	—N/a	—N/a	—N/a	Yes
2004	Teofisto Guingona Jr.	No	No	No	Yes	—N/a
2010	Noli de Castro	No	No	No	Yes	—N/a
2016	Jejomar Binay	Yes	—N/a	—N/a	—N/a	No
2022	Leni Robredo	Yes	—N/a	—N/a	—N/a	No

Five vice presidents ran for the presidency after their vice presidential term ended. Two of them won, in 1961, beating the incumbent president, and in 1998. Three of them, in 1992, 2016, and 2022, lost. Two vice presidents ran for another office after their vice presidential term ended; both won: in 1953, the vice president ran and won for senator, finishing first, and in 1965 where the vice president ran for a seat in the House of Representatives. Two vice presidents defended the seat, with both succeeding in 1941 and 1969. Two vice presidents did not pursue other office after their vice presidential term ended.

== Regional trends ==
=== Regional corridors ===
Political strategists have divided the country into several "corridors" that replicate or combine administrative regions, which in turn are mostly based from the main ethnic groups. In 1992, prior to the 1992 election, Luis Villafuerte outlined several "corridors" throughout the country, from north to south:

Corridor	Region/Province	Voters as of 2016	%	Map
Solid North	Ilocos Region (minus Pangasinan), Cagayan Valley and Cordillera Administrative Region	4,072,629	7.49%	
Lingayen-Lucena corridor	Pangasinan (part of Ilocos Region), Central Luzon, Metro Manila and Calabarzon	21,634,173	39.80%	
Bicol corridor	Bicol Region	3,121,662	5.74%	
Panay corridor	Western Visayas	2,578,661	4.74%	
Negros corridor	Negros Island	2,449,204	4.51%	
Cebu-Bohol corridor	Central Visayas	3,590,044	6.60%	
Samar-Leyte corridor	Eastern Visayas	2,698,880	4.97%	
Northern Mindanao corridor	Northern Mindanao and Caraga	4,088,424	7.52%	
Zamboanga corridor	Zamboanga Peninsula	1,931,795	3.56%	
Davao corridor	Davao Region	2,659,704	4.89%	
Cotabato corridor	Soccsksargen and Maguindanao	2,720,435	5.00%	
Not mentioned by Villafuerte	Mimaropa and the rest of Bangsamoro	2,818,233	5.18%	

=== Metro Manila as an opposition stronghold ===
Manila, and by extension, Metro Manila when it was created in 1975, has voted for the opposition candidate (or the opponent(s) of the incumbent's party) in the election.

This became apparent in the 1935 election, where it was thought that the opponents of the Nacionalista candidates (as this was the first election, the Nacionalistas were the ruling party of the insular territory) would beat them in Manila. The Nacionalistas still prevailed.

Election	Party of incumbent	Winner in Manila	Opposition won at Manila?
1941	Nacionalista	Nacionalista	No
1946	Nacionalista	Liberal	Yes
1949	Liberal	Nacionalista	Yes
1953	Liberal	Nacionalista	Yes
1957	Nacionalista	Liberal	Yes
1961	Nacionalista	Liberal	Yes
1965	Liberal	Nacionalista	Yes
1969	Nacionalista	Nacionalista	No

Election	Party of incumbent	Winner in Metro Manila	Opposition won at Metro Manila?
1981	KBL	KBL	No
1986	KBL	UNIDO	Yes
1992	Independent; incumbent supported Lakas candidate	PRP	Yes
1998	Lakas	LAMMP	Yes
2004	Lakas	KNP	Yes
2010	Lakas–Kampi	Liberal	Yes
2016	Liberal	PDP–Laban	Yes
2022	PDP–Laban; party supported PFP candidate	PFP	No

=== Bellwether provinces ===
Since the creation of the province of Basilan, the province has always had the provincial winner be elected President. The national winner has always been the winner in Negros Oriental except in 1961 and 2016.

Election	National winner	Winner in Basilan	Basilan winner won nationally?	Winner in Agusan del Norte	Agusan del Norte winner won nationally?	Winner in Lanao del Sur	Lanao del Sur winner won nationally?
1935	Manuel L. Quezon	—N/a		Manuel L. Quezon	Yes	Manuel L. Quezon	Yes
1941	Manuel L. Quezon	—N/a		Manuel L. Quezon	Yes	Manuel L. Quezon	Yes
1946	Manuel Roxas	—N/a		Manuel Roxas	Yes	Sergio Osmeña	No
1949	Elpidio Quirino	—N/a		Elpidio Quirino	Yes	Elpidio Quirino	Yes
1953	Ramon Magsaysay	—N/a		Ramon Magsaysay	Yes	Ramon Magsaysay	Yes
1957	Carlos P. Garcia	—N/a		Carlos P. Garcia	Yes	Carlos P. Garcia	Yes
1961	Diosdado Macapagal	—N/a		Carlos P. Garcia	No	Carlos P. Garcia	No
1965	Ferdinand Marcos	—N/a		Diosdado Macapagal	No	Diosdado Macapagal	No
1969	Ferdinand Marcos	—N/a		Ferdinand Marcos	Yes	Ferdinand Marcos	Yes
1981	Ferdinand Marcos	Ferdinand Marcos	Yes	Ferdinand Marcos	Yes	Ferdinand Marcos	Yes
1986	Corazon Aquino assumed presidency	Corazon Aquino	Yes	Corazon Aquino	Yes	Corazon Aquino	Yes
1992	Fidel V. Ramos	Fidel V. Ramos	Yes	Fidel V. Ramos	Yes	Fidel V. Ramos	Yes
1998	Joseph Estrada	Joseph Estrada	Yes	Joseph Estrada	Yes	Joseph Estrada	Yes
2004	Gloria Macapagal Arroyo	Gloria Macapagal Arroyo	Yes	Gloria Macapagal Arroyo	Yes	Gloria Macapagal Arroyo	Yes
2010	Benigno Aquino III	Benigno Aquino III	Yes	Benigno Aquino III	Yes	Benigno Aquino III	Yes
2016	Rodrigo Duterte	Rodrigo Duterte	Yes	Rodrigo Duterte	Yes	Rodrigo Duterte	Yes
2022	Bongbong Marcos	Bongbong Marcos	Yes	Bongbong Marcos	Yes	Faisal Mangondato	No

After the losing candidate won in Negros Oriental in 2016, the longest streak belongs to Agusan del Norte which had its provincial winner follow the national winner since the 1969 election; Lanao del Sur broke its streak when a losing candidate won there in 2022.

=== Home province as a stronghold ===
Candidates usually win their home provinces or cities and by extension, region, except when the province has two or more candidates as residents.

==== President ====
Bolded name indicates the national winner.

Election	Candidate	Home province/city of the candidate	Winner at the home province/city	Candidate won at home province/city?
1935	Manuel L. Quezon	Tayabas	**Manuel L. Quezon**	Yes
1935	Emilio Aguinaldo	Cavite	Emilio Aguinaldo	Yes
1935	Gregorio Aglipay	Ilocos Norte	Gregorio Aglipay	Yes
1941	Manuel L. Quezon	Tayabas	**Manuel L. Quezon**	Yes
1941	Juan Sumulong	Rizal	**Manuel L. Quezon**	No
1946	Manuel Roxas	Capiz	**Manuel Roxas**	Yes
1946	Sergio Osmeña	Cebu	Sergio Osmeña	Yes
1949	Elpidio Quirino	Ilocos Sur	**Elpidio Quirino**	Yes
1949	Jose Paciano Laurel	Batangas	Jose Paciano Laurel	Yes
1949	Jose Avelino	Samar	Jose Avelino	Yes
1953	Ramon Magsaysay	Zambales	**Ramon Magsaysay**	Yes
1953	Elpidio Quirino	Ilocos Sur	Elpidio Quirino	Yes
1957	Carlos P. Garcia	Bohol	**Carlos P. Garcia**	Yes
1957	Jose Yulo	Negros Occidental	**Carlos P. Garcia**	No
1957	Manuel Manahan	La Union	Jose Yulo	No
1957	Claro M. Recto	Quezon	Claro M. Recto	Yes
1961	Diosdado Macapagal	Pampanga	**Diosdado Macapagal**	Yes
1961	Carlos P. Garcia	Bohol	Carlos P. Garcia	Yes
1965	Ferdinand Marcos	Ilocos Norte	**Ferdinand Marcos**	Yes
1965	Diosdado Macapagal	Pampanga	Diosdado Macapagal	Yes
1969	Ferdinand Marcos	Ilocos Norte	**Ferdinand Marcos**	Yes
1969	Sergio Osmeña, Jr.	Cebu	**Ferdinand Marcos**	No
1981	Ferdinand Marcos	Ilocos Norte	**Ferdinand Marcos**	Yes
1981	Alejo Santos	Bulacan	**Ferdinand Marcos**	No
1986	Corazon Aquino	Tarlac	**Corazon Aquino**	Yes
1986	Ferdinand Marcos	Ilocos Norte	Ferdinand Marcos	Yes
1992	Fidel V. Ramos	Pangasinan	**Fidel V. Ramos**	Yes
1992	Miriam Defensor-Santiago	Iloilo	Miriam Defensor-Santiago	Yes
1992	Eduardo Cojuangco, Jr.	Tarlac	Eduardo Cojuangco, Jr.	Yes
1992	Ramon Mitra, Jr.	Palawan	Ramon Mitra, Jr.	Yes
1992	Imelda Marcos	Leyte	Imelda Marcos	Yes
1992	Jovito Salonga	Rizal	Miriam Defensor-Santiago	No
1992	Salvador Laurel	Batangas	Salvador Laurel	Yes
1998	Joseph Estrada	San Juan	**Joseph Estrada**	Yes
1998	Jose de Venecia, Jr.	Pangasinan	Jose de Venecia, Jr.	Yes
1998	Raul Roco	Camarines Sur	Raul Roco	Yes
1998	Emilio Osmeña	Cebu	Emilio Osmeña	Yes
1998	Alfredo Lim	Manila	**Joseph Estrada**	No
1998	Renato de Villa	Batangas	Renato de Villa	Yes
1998	Miriam Defensor-Santiago	Iloilo	Miriam Defensor-Santiago	Yes
1998	Juan Ponce Enrile	Cagayan	Juan Ponce Enrile	Yes
2004	Gloria Macapagal Arroyo	Pampanga	**Gloria Macapagal Arroyo**	Yes
2004	Fernando Poe, Jr.	Manila	Fernando Poe, Jr.	Yes
2004	Panfilo Lacson	Cavite	Panfilo Lacson	Yes
2004	Raul Roco	Camarines Sur	Raul Roco	Yes
2004	Eddie Villanueva	Bulacan	Fernando Poe, Jr.	No
2010	Benigno Aquino III	Tarlac	**Benigno Aquino III**	Yes
2010	Joseph Estrada	San Juan	**Benigno Aquino III**	No
2010	Manny Villar	Las Piñas	Manny Villar	Yes
2010	Gilbert Teodoro	Tarlac	**Benigno Aquino III**	No
2010	Eddie Villanueva	Bulacan	**Benigno Aquino III**	No
2016	Jejomar Binay	Makati	Jejomar Binay	Yes
2016	Miriam Defensor-Santiago	Iloilo	Mar Roxas	No
2016	Rodrigo Duterte	Davao City	**Rodrigo Duterte**	Yes
2016	Grace Poe	San Juan	**Rodrigo Duterte**	No
2016	Mar Roxas	Capiz	Mar Roxas	Yes
2022	Ernesto Abella	Davao City	**Bongbong Marcos**	No
2022	Leody de Guzman	Rizal	**Bongbong Marcos**	No
2022	Norberto Gonzales	Bataan	**Bongbong Marcos**	No
2022	Panfilo Lacson	Cavite	**Bongbong Marcos**	No
2022	Faisal Mangondato	Lanao del Sur	Faisal Mangondato	Yes
2022	Bongbong Marcos	Ilocos Norte	**Bongbong Marcos**	Yes
2022	Jose Montemayor Jr.	Cavite	**Bongbong Marcos**	No
2022	Isko Moreno	Manila	**Bongbong Marcos**	No
2022	Manny Pacquiao	Sarangani	Manny Pacquiao	Yes
2022	Leni Robredo	Camarines Sur	Leni Robredo	Yes

==== Vice president ====
Election	Home province/city of the national winner	Winner at the home province/city of the national winner	National winner	National winner won at home province/city?
1935	Cebu	Sergio Osmeña	Sergio Osmeña	Yes
1941	Cebu	Sergio Osmeña	Sergio Osmeña	Yes
1946	Ilocos Sur	Elpidio Quirino	Elpidio Quirino	Yes
1949	Iloilo	Fernando Lopez	Fernando Lopez	Yes
1953	Bohol	Carlos P. Garcia	Carlos P. Garcia	Yes
1957	Pampanga	Diosdado Macapagal	Diosdado Macapagal	Yes
1961	Misamis Oriental	Gil Puyat	Emmanuel Pelaez	No
1965	Iloilo	Fernando Lopez	Fernando Lopez	Yes
1969	Iloilo	Fernando Lopez	Fernando Lopez	Yes
1986	Batangas	Salvador Laurel	Salvador Laurel	Yes
1992	San Juan	Joseph Estrada	Joseph Estrada	Yes
1998	Pampanga	Gloria Macapagal Arroyo	Gloria Macapagal Arroyo	Yes
2004	Oriental Mindoro	Noli de Castro	Noli de Castro	Yes
2010	Makati	Jejomar Binay	Jejomar Binay	Yes
2016	Camarines Sur	Leni Robredo	Leni Robredo	Yes
2022	Davao City	Sara Duterte	Sara Duterte	Yes

== Results by popular vote margin ==
=== For president ===
Year	Winner	% of vote	% margin	Votes	Vote margin	Second place
2004	Gloria Macapagal Arroyo	39.99%	3.48%	12,905,808	1,123,576	Fernando Poe, Jr.
1992	Fidel V. Ramos	23.58%	3.86%	5,342,521	874,348	Miriam Defensor Santiago
1986	Ferdinand Marcos	53.62%	7.52%	10,807,197	1,515,436	Corazon Aquino
1965	Ferdinand Marcos	51.94%	9.06%	3,861,324	673,572	Diosdado Macapagal
1961	Diosdado Macapagal	55.05%	10.10%	3,554,840	651,844	Carlos P. Garcia
1946	Manuel Roxas	55.78%	11.80%	1,333,392	282,149	Sergio Osmeña
1957	Carlos P. Garcia	41.28%	13.66%	2,072,257	685,428	José Yulo
1949	Elpidio Quirino	50.93%	13.71%	1,803,808	485,478	José P. Laurel
2016	Rodrigo Duterte	39.01%	15.56%	16,601,997	6,623,822	Mar Roxas
2010	Benigno Aquino III	42.08%	15.83%	15,208,678	5,720,841	Joseph Estrada
1969	Ferdinand Marcos	61.47%	22.96%	5,017,343	1,874,221	Sergio Osmeña, Jr.
1998	Joseph Estrada	39.86%	23.99%	10,722,295	6,463,812	Jose de Venecia
2022	Bongbong Marcos	58.77%	30.83%	31,629,783	16,594,010	Leni Robredo
1953	Ramon Magsaysay	68.90%	37.82%	2,912,992	1,599,001	Elpidio Quirino
1935	Manuel L. Quezon	67.99%	50.45%	695,332	515,983	Emilio Aguinaldo
1941	Manuel L. Quezon	86.91%	79.33%	812,352	741,453	Juan Sumulong
1981	Ferdinand Marcos	88.02%	79.77%	18,309,360	16,592,911	Alejo Santos

=== For vice president ===
Year	Winner	% of vote	% margin	Votes	Vote margin	Second place
1965	Fernando Lopez	48.48%	0.37%	3,531,550	26,724	Gerardo Roxas
2016	Leni Robredo	35.11%	0.61%	14,418,817	263,473	Bongbong Marcos
2010	Jejomar Binay	41.65%	2.07%	14,645,574	727,084	Mar Roxas
2004	Noli de Castro	49.80%	2.91%	15,100,431	881,722	Loren Legarda
1961	Emmanuel Pelaez	37.57%	3.20%	2,394,400	203,976	Sergio Osmeña, Jr.
1986	Arturo Tolentino	50.65%	4.80%	10,134,130	961,025	Salvador Laurel
1946	Elpidio Quirino	52.36%	4.98%	1,161,725	110,482	Eulogio Rodriguez
1949	Fernando Lopez	52.19%	6.11%	1,341,284	157,069	Manuel Briones
1957	Diosdado Macapagal	46.55%	8.64%	2,189,197	406,185	José Laurel, Jr.
1992	Joseph Estrada	33.00%	11.27%	6,739,738	2,301,244	Marcelo Fernan
1969	Fernando Lopez	62.76%	25.51%	5,001,737	2,033,211	Genaro Magsaysay
1953	Carlos P. Garcia	62.90%	25.79%	2,515,265	1,031,463	José Yulo
1998	Gloria Macapagal Arroyo	49.56%	27.45%	12,667,252	7,015,184	Edgardo Angara
2022	Sara Duterte	61.53%	43.71%	32,208,417	22,879,210	Francis Pangilinan
1935	Sergio Osmeña	86.91%	82.86%	812,352	741,453	Raymundo Melliza
1941	Sergio Osmeña	92.10%	84.20%	1,445,897	1,321,862	Emilio Javier

== Results by election ==
=== 1899 ===
1899 Philippine presidential election
- 1 January 1899
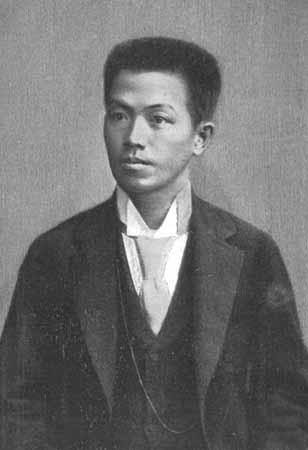
Nominee	Emilio Aguinaldo
Party	Nonpartisan
Percentage	100.00%
President before election
Emilio Aguinaldo
Magdalo
(as Alliance)
Elected President
Emilio Aguinaldo
Nonpartisan

Emilio Aguinaldo was unanimously elected and voted president by the Malolos Congress on January 1, 1899. He was inaugurated on January 23, along with the First Philippine Republic.

=== 1935 ===
In the first presidential election by popular vote, Quezon defeated former president Aguinaldo and Philippine Independent Church Supreme Bishop Gregorio Aglipay.

==== For President ====
Candidate	Party	Votes	%
Manuel L. Quezon	Nacionalista Party	695,332	67.98
Emilio Aguinaldo	National Socialist Party	179,349	17.53
Gregorio Aglipay	Republican Party	148,010	14.47
Pascual Racuyal	Independent	158	0.02
Total		1,022,849	100.00

==== For Vice President ====
Candidate	Party	Votes	%
Sergio Osmeña	Nacionalista Party	812,352	86.91
Raymundo Melliza	National Socialist Party	70,899	7.59
Norberto Nabong	Republican Party (Note: Member of the Partido Komunista ng Pilipinas carrying the Republican Party banner)	51,443	5.50
Total		934,694	100.00

=== 1941 ===
President Quezon and Vice President Sergio Osmeña resoundingly defeated their opponents to stay in office.

==== For President ====
Candidate	Party	Votes	%
Manuel L. Quezon	Nacionalista Party	1,340,320	80.14
Juan Sumulong	Popular Front (Sumulong wing) (Note: The Popular Front was split into two wings: those who supported Pedro Abad Santos or the "Abad Santos wing" and those who supported Juan Sumulong or the "Sumulong wing".)	298,608	17.85
Celerino Tiongco I	Ganap Party	22,474	1.34
Hilario Moncado	Modernist Party	10,726	0.64
Hermogenes Dumpit	Independent	298	0.02
Veronica Miciano	Independent	62	0.00
Ernesto T. Belleza	Independent	16	0.00
Pedro Abad Santos (Note: Withdrew)	Popular Front (Abad Santos wing)	0	0.00
Total		1,672,504	100.00

==== For Vice President ====
Candidate	Party	Votes	%
Sergio Osmeña	Nacionalista Party	1,445,897	90.24
Emilio Javier	Popular Front (Sumulong wing) (Note: The Popular Front was split into two wings: those who supported Pedro Abad Santos or the "Abad Santos wing" and those who supported Juan Sumulong or the "Sumulong wing".)	124,035	7.74
Pilar Aglipay	Republican Party	32,148	2.01
Pedro Yabut	Independent	123	0.01
Emilio Aguinaldo (Note: Withdrew)	Modernist Party	0	0.00
Total		1,602,203	100.00

=== 1943 ===
Jose P. Laurel was elected president unopposed by the National Assembly on September 25, 1943.

Candidate	Party	Votes	%
Jose P. Laurel	KALIBAPI	108	100.00
Total		108	100.00
Valid votes		108	100.00
Invalid/blank votes		0	0.00
Total votes		108	100.00
Registered voters/turnout		108	100.00

=== 1946 ===
In 1944, President Quezon died, thereby Vice President Osmeña succeeded him as president. By 1946, the ruling Nacionalista Party was split into two, with its liberal wing putting up its own candidate for president in the person of Manuel Roxas. Roxas defeated Osmeña in the election. Roxas's running mate Elpidio Quirino defeated Eulogio Rodriguez to win the vice presidency.

==== For President ====
Candidate	Party	Votes	%
Manuel Roxas	Nacionalista Party (Liberal wing) (Note: The Nacionalista Party was split into two wings: those who supported Osmeña or the "conservative wing", and those who supported Roxas or the "liberal wing". The liberal wing eventually split off after the election and became the Liberal Party.)	1,333,006	53.93
Sergio Osmeña	Nacionalista Party	1,129,994	45.72
Hilario Moncado	Modernist Party	8,538	0.35
Total		2,471,538	100.00
Valid votes		2,471,538	95.17
Invalid/blank votes		125,342	4.83
Total votes		2,596,880	100.00
Registered voters/turnout		2,898,604	89.59
Source: Nohlen, Grotz, Hartmann, Hasall and Santos

==== For Vice President ====
Candidate	Party	Votes	%
Elpidio Quirino	Nacionalista Party (Liberal wing) (Note: The Nacionalista Party was split into two wings: those who supported Osmeña or the "conservative wing", and those who supported Roxas or the "liberal wing". The liberal wing eventually split off after the election and became the Liberal Party.)	1,161,725	52.36
Eulogio Rodriguez	Nacionalista Party	1,051,243	47.38
Lou Salvador	Modernist Party	5,879	0.26
Total		2,218,847	100.00
Valid votes		2,218,847	85.44
Invalid/blank votes		378,033	14.56
Total votes		2,596,880	100.00
Registered voters/turnout		2,898,604	89.59
Source: Nohlen, Grotz, Hartmann, Hasall and Santos

=== 1949 ===
President Roxas died in 1948. Vice President Elpidio Quirino succeeded him, and was elected president on his own right in 1949. His running running mate, senator Fernando Lopez won the vice presidential election.

==== For President ====
Candidate	Party	Votes	%
Elpidio Quirino (incumbent)	Liberal Party (Quirino wing) (Note: The Liberal Party was split into two wings: those who supported Quirino or the "Quirinitas" or the "Quirino wing", and those who supported Avelino or the "Avelinistas" or the "Avelino wing".)	1,803,808	50.93
Jose P. Laurel	Nacionalista Party	1,318,320	37.22
José Avelino	Liberal Party (Avelino wing)	419,890	11.85
Total		3,542,018	100.00
Valid votes		3,542,018	98.94
Invalid/blank votes		37,899	1.06
Total votes		3,579,917	100.00
Registered voters/turnout		5,135,814	69.70
Source: Nohlen, Grotz, Hartmann, Hasall and Santos

==== For Vice President ====
Candidate	Party	Votes	%
Fernando Lopez	Liberal Party (Quirino wing) (Note: The Liberal Party was split into two wings: those who supported Elpidio Quirino or the "Quirinitas" or the "Quirino wing", and those who supported Jose Avelino or the "Avelinistas" or the "Avelino wing".)	1,741,302	51.67
Manuel Briones	Nacionalista Party	1,184,215	35.14
Vicente Francisco	Liberal Party (Avelino wing)	444,550	13.19
Total		3,370,067	100.00
Valid votes		3,370,067	94.14
Invalid/blank votes		209,850	5.86
Total votes		3,579,917	100.00
Registered voters/turnout		5,135,814	69.70
Source: Nohlen, Grotz, Hartmann, Hasall and Santos

=== 1953 ===
President Quirino was defeated by former Secretary of Defense Ramon Magsaysay in 1953 in a record margin post-independence. His running mate, senator Carlos P. Garcia also resoundingly defeated his opponent.

==== For President ====
Candidate	Party	Votes	%
Ramon Magsaysay	Nacionalista Party	2,912,992	68.90
Elpidio Quirino (incumbent)	Liberal Party	1,313,991	31.08
Gaudencio Bueno	Independent	736	0.02
Total		4,227,719	100.00
Valid votes		4,227,719	97.71
Invalid/blank votes		98,987	2.29
Total votes		4,326,706	100.00
Registered voters/turnout		5,603,231	77.22
Source: Nohlen, Grotz, Hartmann, Hasall and Santos

==== For Vice President ====
Candidate	Party	Votes	%
Carlos P. Garcia	Nacionalista Party	2,515,265	62.90
José Yulo	Liberal Party	1,483,802	37.10
Total		3,999,067	100.00
Valid votes		3,999,067	92.43
Invalid/blank votes		327,639	7.57
Total votes		4,326,706	100.00
Registered voters/turnout		5,603,231	77.22
Source: Nohlen, Grotz, Hartmann, Hasall and Santos

=== 1957 ===
President Magsaysay died in 1957 a few months before the election. His Vice President, Carlos P. Garcia succeeded him, and was elected president on his own right later that year. The opposition won the vice presidency, with Diosdado Macapagal defeating Jose Laurel Jr.

==== For President ====
Candidate	Party	Votes	%
Carlos P. Garcia (incumbent)	Nacionalista Party	2,072,257	41.28
José Yulo	Liberal Party	1,386,829	27.62
Manuel Manahan	Progressive Party	1,049,420	20.90
Claro M. Recto	Nationalist Citizens' Party	429,226	8.55
Antonio Quirino	Liberal Party (Quirino wing) (Note: Quirino ran under his own wing of the Liberal Party, while the rest of the party supported Yulo's candidacy.)	60,328	1.20
Valentin de los Santos	Lapiang Malaya	21,674	0.43
Alfredo Abcede	Federal Party	470	0.01
Total		5,020,204	100.00
Valid votes		5,020,204	98.28
Invalid/blank votes		87,908	1.72
Total votes		5,108,112	100.00
Registered voters/turnout		6,763,897	75.52
Source: Nohlen, Grotz, Hartmann, Hasall and Santos

==== For Vice President ====
Candidate	Party	Votes	%
Diosdado Macapagal	Liberal Party	2,189,197	46.55
Jose Laurel Jr.	Nacionalista Party	1,783,012	37.92
Vicente Araneta	Progressive Party	375,090	7.98
Lorenzo Tañada	Nationalist Citizens' Party	344,685	7.33
Restituto Fresto	Lapiang Malaya	10,494	0.22
Total		4,702,478	100.00
Valid votes		4,702,478	92.06
Invalid/blank votes		405,634	7.94
Total votes		5,108,112	100.00
Registered voters/turnout		6,763,897	75.52
Source: Nohlen, Grotz, Hartmann, Hasall and Santos

=== 1961 ===
President Garcia was defeated by Vice President Diosdado Macapagal. This was the only election where the two top office-holders faced each other for the presidency. Macapagal's running mate Emmanuel Pelaez kept the vice presidency under the Liberal Party's hands.

==== For President ====
Candidate	Party	Votes	%
Diosdado Macapagal	Liberal Party	3,554,840	55.05
Carlos P. Garcia (incumbent)	Nacionalista Party	2,902,996	44.95
Alfredo Abcede	Federal Party	7	0.00
German F. Villanueva	Independent	2	0.00
Gregorio L. Llanza	Independent	2	0.00
Praxedes Floro	Independent	0	0.00
Total		6,457,847	100.00
Valid votes		6,457,847	95.83
Invalid/blank votes		280,988	4.17
Total votes		6,738,835	100.00
Registered voters/turnout		8,483,568	79.43
Source: Nohlen, Grotz, Hartmann, Hasall and Santos

==== For Vice President ====
Candidate	Party	Votes	%
Emmanuel Pelaez	Liberal Party	2,394,400	37.57
Sergio Osmeña Jr.	Independent	2,190,424	34.37
Gil Puyat	Nacionalista Party	1,787,987	28.06
Chencay Reyes Juta	Dominion Status Party	2	0.00
Total		6,372,813	100.00
Valid votes		6,372,813	94.57
Invalid/blank votes		365,992	5.43
Total votes		6,738,805	100.00
Registered voters/turnout		8,483,568	79.43
Source: Nohlen, Grotz, Hartmann, Hasall and Santos

=== 1965 ===
President Macapagal got the nomination of the Liberal Party. This led to Senator Ferdinand Marcos to abandon the party in favor of the Nacionalistas. Marcos and his running mate former vice president Fernando Lopez defeated President Macapagal and Gerardo Roxas in the election.

==== For President ====
Candidate	Party	Votes	%
Ferdinand Marcos	Nacionalista Party	3,861,324	51.94
Diosdado Macapagal (incumbent)	Liberal Party	3,187,752	42.88
Raul Manglapus	Party for Philippine Progress	384,564	5.17
Gaudencio Bueno	New Leaf Party	199	0.00
Aniceto A. Hidalgo	New Leaf Party	156	0.00
Segundo Baldovi	Partido ng Bansa	139	0.00
Nic V. Garces	People’s Progressive Democratic Party	130	0.00
German F. Villanueva	Independent	106	0.00
Guillermo M. Mercado	Laborer Party	27	0.00
Antonio Nicolas Jr.	Allied Party	27	0.00
Blandino P. Ruan	Independent	6	0.00
Praxedes Floro	Independent	1	0.00
Total		7,434,431	100.00
Valid votes		7,434,431	97.69
Invalid/blank votes		175,620	2.31
Total votes		7,610,051	100.00
Registered voters/turnout		9,962,345	76.39
Source: Nohlen, Grotz, Hartmann, Hasall and Santos

==== For Vice President ====
Candidate	Party	Votes	%
Fernando Lopez	Nacionalista Party	3,531,550	48.48
Gerry Roxas	Liberal Party	3,504,826	48.11
Manuel Manahan	Party for Philippine Progress	247,426	3.40
Gonzalo D. Vasquez	Reformist Party of the Philippines	644	0.01
Severo Capales	New Leaf Party	193	0.00
Eleodoro Salvador	Partido ng Bansa	172	0.00
Total		7,284,811	100.00
Valid votes		7,284,811	95.73
Invalid/blank votes		325,240	4.27
Total votes		7,610,051	100.00
Registered voters/turnout		9,962,345	76.39
Source: Nohlen, Grotz, Hartmann, Hasall and Santos

=== 1969 ===
President Marcos became the first president to defend the presidency on his first full term in 1969. Vice president Lopez won an unprecedented third vice presidential term.

==== For President ====
Candidate	Party	Votes	%
Ferdinand Marcos (incumbent)	Nacionalista Party	5,017,343	62.24
Sergio Osmeña Jr.	Liberal Party	3,043,122	37.75
Pascual Racuyal	Independent	778	0.01
Segundo Baldovi	Partido ng Bansa	177	0.00
Pantaleon H. Panelo	Independent	123	0.00
German F. Villanueva	Independent	82	0.00
Gaudencio Bueno	New Leaf Party	44	0.00
Angel Comagon	Independent	35	0.00
Cesar Bulacan	Independent	31	0.00
Espiridion D. Buencamino	NP	23	0.00
Nic V. Garces	Philippine Pro-Socialist Party	23	0.00
Benito Jose	Independent	23	0.00
Total		8,061,804	100.00
Valid votes		8,061,804	98.28
Invalid/blank votes		140,989	1.72
Total votes		8,202,793	100.00
Registered voters/turnout		10,300,898	79.63
Source: Nohlen, Grotz, Hartmann, Hasall and Santos

==== For Vice President ====
Candidate	Party	Votes	%
Fernando Lopez	Nacionalista Party	5,001,737	62.75
Genaro Magsaysay	Liberal Party	2,968,526	37.24
Victoriano Mallari	Partido ng Bansa	229	0.00
Modesto T. Jalandoni	Philippine Pro-Socialist Party	161	0.00
Total		7,970,653	100.00
Valid votes		7,970,653	97.17
Invalid/blank votes		232,140	2.83
Total votes		8,202,793	100.00
Registered voters/turnout		10,300,898	79.63
Source: Nohlen, Grotz, Hartmann, Hasall and Santos

=== 1973 martial law referendum ===
By 1972, President Marcos declared martial law. A year later, a plebiscite approved a new constitution that allowed the president to stay in power beyond 1973 as allowed by the previous (1935) constitution. A few months after that, another referendum asked voters if they wanted Marcos to stay in power beyond 1973:

Do you want President Marcos to continue beyond 1973 and finish the reforms he has initiated under the martial law?
Choice	Votes	%
Yes	17,653,200	90.48
No	1,856,744	9.52
Total	19,509,944	100.00

=== 1977 presidential referendum ===
In 1977, a referendum approved Marcos staying as president after the Interim Batasang Pambansa was organized a year later.

Do you vote that President Ferdinand E. Marcos continue in office as incumbent president and be prime minister after the organization of the Interim Batasang Pambansa in 1978?
Choice	Votes	%
Yes	20,062,782	89.27
No	2,104,209	9.37
Abstain	1,927,236	1.33
Total votes	24,094,227	100.00

=== 1981 ===
In 1981, President Marcos won in an election that was boycotted by much of the opposition. His winning margin is a record, and his vote total has not been matched to date in a single-winner election.

Candidate	Party	Votes	%
Ferdinand Marcos (incumbent)	Kilusang Bagong Lipunan	18,309,360	88.02
Alejo Santos	Nacionalista Party (Roy wing) (Note: Santos ran under Jose Roy's wing of the Nacionalista Party, while the rest of the party boycotted the election.)	1,716,449	8.25
Bartolome Cabangbang	Federal Party	749,845	3.60
Delfin R. Manapaz	Independent	6,499	0.03
Ursula C. Dajao	Independent	4,955	0.02
Benito L. Valdez	Independent	4,224	0.02
Lope B. Rimando	Independent	1,954	0.01
Lucio A. Hinigpit	Sovereign Citizen Party	1,945	0.01
Pacifico S. Morelos	Independent	1,740	0.01
Jose C. Igrobay	Independent	1,421	0.01
Simeon G. del Rosario	Independent	1,234	0.01
Salvador Q. Enage	Independent	1,185	0.01
Florencio Z. Tipano	Independent	592	0.00
Total		20,801,403	100.00
Valid votes		20,801,403	95.23
Invalid/blank votes		1,042,426	4.77
Total votes		21,843,829	100.00
Registered voters/turnout		26,986,451	80.94
Source: Nohlen, Grotz, Hartmann, Hasall and Santos

=== 1986 ===
In 1986, President Marcos called for a special presidential election. He was proclaimed winner despite allegations of massive fraud, but was ousted by the People Power Revolution weeks later. The revolution installed Marcos's opponent, Corazon Aquino, as president and her running mate Salvador Laurel, as vice president.

==== For President ====
Candidate	Party	Votes	%
Ferdinand Marcos (incumbent)	Kilusang Bagong Lipunan	10,807,197	53.62
Corazon Aquino	United Nationalist Democratic Organization	9,291,716	46.10
Reuben Canoy	Social Democratic Party	34,041	0.17
Narciso Padilla	Movement for Truth, Order and Righteousness	23,652	0.12
Total		20,156,606	100.00
Valid votes		20,156,606	97.30
Invalid/blank votes		559,469	2.70
Total votes		20,716,075	100.00
Registered voters/turnout		26,278,744	78.83
Source: Annex XXXVIII of the report by the International Observer Delegation

==== For Vice President ====
Candidate	Party	Votes	%
Arturo Tolentino	Kilusang Bagong Lipunan	10,134,130	50.66
Salvador Laurel	United Nationalist Democratic Organization	9,173,105	45.85
Eva Estrada Kalaw	Liberal Party (Kalaw wing) (Note: Kalaw ran under her own wing of the Liberal Party, while the rest of party supported Laurel's candidacy.)	662,185	3.31
Roger Arienda	Movement for Truth, Order and Righteousness	35,974	0.18
Total		20,005,394	100.00
Valid votes		20,005,394	96.57
Invalid/blank votes		710,681	3.43
Total votes		20,716,075	100.00
Registered voters/turnout		26,278,744	78.83
Source: Annex XXXVIII of the report by the International Observer Delegation

=== 1992 ===
Prior to the election, President Aquino announced that she won't be running, anointing Speaker Ramon Mitra Jr. as her preferred successor. She later changed her mind, and picked Secretary of Defense Fidel V. Ramos instead. Ramos narrowly defeated Agrarian Reform Secretary Miriam Defensor Santiago, who alleged fraud, Mitra and four others.

Joseph Estrada, who initially ran for president, slid down to become the vice presidential running mate of Danding Cojuangco and won.

==== For President ====
Candidate	Party	Votes	%
Fidel V. Ramos	Lakas–NUCD	5,342,521	23.58
Miriam Defensor Santiago	People's Reform Party	4,468,173	19.72
Danding Cojuangco	Nationalist People's Coalition	4,116,376	18.17
Ramon Mitra Jr.	Laban ng Demokratikong Pilipino	3,316,661	14.64
Imelda Marcos	Kilusang Bagong Lipunan	2,338,294	10.32
Jovito Salonga	Liberal Party	2,302,124	10.16
Salvador Laurel	Nacionalista Party	770,046	3.40
Total		22,654,195	100.00
Valid votes		22,654,195	93.40
Invalid/blank votes		1,600,759	6.60
Total votes		24,254,954	100.00
Registered voters/turnout		32,141,079	75.46
Source: Nohlen, Grotz, Hartmann, Hasall and Santos

==== For Vice President ====
Candidate	Party	Votes	%
Joseph Estrada	Nationalist People's Coalition	6,739,738	33.01
Marcelo Fernan	Laban ng Demokratikong Pilipino	4,438,494	21.74
Lito Osmeña	Lakas–NUCD	3,362,467	16.47
Ramon Magsaysay Jr.	People's Reform Party	2,900,556	14.20
Nene Pimentel (Note: Running mate of Jovito Salonga (Liberal Party))	PDP–Laban	2,023,289	9.91
Vicente Magsaysay	Kilusang Bagong Lipunan	699,895	3.43
Eva Estrada Kalaw	Nacionalista Party	255,730	1.25
Total		20,420,169	100.00
Valid votes		20,420,169	84.19
Invalid/blank votes		3,834,785	15.81
Total votes		24,254,954	100.00
Registered voters/turnout		32,141,079	75.46
Source: Nohlen, Grotz, Hartmann, Hasall and Santos

=== 1998 ===
President Ramos handpicked Speaker Jose de Venecia Jr. as his preferred successor. He was defeated by Vice President Joseph Estrada who had a healthy lead against de Venecia. In the vice presidential election, senator Gloria Macapagal Arroyo also had a clear advantage over Estrada's running mate senator Edgardo Angara.

==== For President ====
Candidate	Party	Votes	%
Joseph Estrada	Laban ng Makabayang Masang Pilipino	10,722,295	39.86
Jose de Venecia Jr.	Lakas–NUCD–UMDP	4,268,483	15.87
Raul Roco	Aksyon Demokratiko	3,720,212	13.83
Lito Osmeña	PROMDI	3,347,631	12.44
Alfredo Lim	Liberal Party	2,344,362	8.71
Renato de Villa	Partido para sa Demokratikong Reporma–Lapiang Manggagawa	1,308,352	4.86
Miriam Defensor Santiago	People's Reform Party	797,206	2.96
Juan Ponce Enrile	Independent	343,139	1.28
Santiago Dumlao	Kilusan para sa Pambansang Pagpapanibago	32,212	0.12
Manuel Morato	Partido Bansang Marangal	18,644	0.07
Total		26,902,536	100.00
Valid votes		26,902,536	91.86
Invalid/blank votes (Note: Includes 232,714 votes for Imelda Marcos (Kilusang Bagong Lipunan) who withdrew after the ballots were printed.)		2,383,239	8.14
Total votes		29,285,775	100.00
Registered voters/turnout		33,873,665	86.46
Source: Nohlen, Grotz, Hartmann, Hasall and Santos

==== For Vice President ====
Candidate	Party	Votes	%
Gloria Macapagal Arroyo	Lakas–NUCD–UMDP	12,667,252	49.56
Edgardo Angara	Laban ng Makabayang Masang Pilipino	5,652,068	22.11
Oscar Orbos	Partido para sa Demokratikong Reporma–Lapiang Manggagawa	3,321,779	13.00
Serge Osmeña	Liberal Party	2,351,462	9.20
Francisco Tatad	Grand Alliance for Democracy	745,389	2.92
Ismael Sueno	PROMDI	537,677	2.10
Irene Santiago	Aksyon Demokratiko	240,210	0.94
Camilo Sabio	Partido Bansang Marangal	22,010	0.09
Reynaldo Pacheco	Kilusan para sa Pambansang Pagpapanibago	21,422	0.08
Total		25,559,269	100.00
Valid votes		25,559,269	87.28
Invalid/blank votes		3,726,506	12.72
Total votes		29,285,775	100.00
Registered voters/turnout		33,873,665	86.46

=== 2004 ===
In 2001, President Estrada was ousted via the 2001 EDSA Revolution due to massive corruption. Vice President Gloria Macapagal Arroyo succeeded him and was elected president on her own right in 2004 against Estrada's friend Fernando Poe Jr. Poe died later that year, and by 2005, the Hello Garci scandal erupted where Arroyo was seen to have benefitted from massive cheating in the election.

Senator Noli de Castro narrowly defeated senator Loren Legarda, who also alleged cheating.

==== For President ====
Candidate	Party	Votes	%
Gloria Macapagal Arroyo (incumbent)	Lakas–CMD	12,905,808	39.99
Fernando Poe Jr.	Koalisyon ng Nagkakaisang Pilipino	11,782,232	36.51
Panfilo Lacson	Laban ng Demokratikong Pilipino (Aquino wing) (Note: Lacson ran under the wing of the LDP led by Butz Aquino; the rest of the party supported Poe's candidacy.)	3,510,080	10.88
Raul Roco	Aksyon Demokratiko	2,082,762	6.45
Eddie Villanueva	Bangon Pilipinas	1,988,218	6.16
Total		32,269,100	100.00
Valid votes		32,269,100	96.30
Invalid/blank votes		1,240,992	3.70
Total votes		33,510,092	100.00
Registered voters/turnout		43,895,324	76.34

==== For Vice President ====
Candidate	Party	Votes	%
Noli de Castro (Note: Running mate of Gloria Macapagal Arroyo (Lakas–CMD))	Independent	15,100,431	49.80
Loren Legarda	Koalisyon ng Nagkakaisang Pilipino	14,218,709	46.89
Herminio Aquino	Aksyon Demokratiko	981,500	3.24
Rodolfo Pajo (Note: Running mate of Eddie Gil (Partido Isang Bansa, Isang Diwa) who was disqualified)	Partido Isang Bansa, Isang Diwa	22,244	0.07
Total		30,322,884	100.00
Valid votes		30,322,884	90.49
Invalid/blank votes		3,187,208	9.51
Total votes		33,510,092	100.00
Registered voters/turnout		43,895,324	76.34

=== 2010 ===
Approaching the 2010 election, President Arroyo was deeply unpopular. Her Lakas Kampi CMD party nominated Secretary of Defense Gilbert Teodoro, but rumors persisted that she wanted Senator Manuel Villar to succeed her. In 2009, former president Aquino died, catapulting her son Senator Benigno Aquino III in the presidential race. Aquino defeated former president Estrada, Villar, Teodoro and several others in the election.

Estrada's running mate Makati mayor Jejomar Binay narrowly defeated senator Mar Roxas, the initial presidential nominee who slid down for Aquino.

==== For President ====
Candidate	Party	Votes	%
Benigno Aquino III	Liberal Party	15,208,678	42.08
Joseph Estrada	Pwersa ng Masang Pilipino	9,487,837	26.25
Manny Villar	Nacionalista Party	5,573,835	15.42
Gilbert Teodoro	Lakas–Kampi–CMD	4,095,839	11.33
Eddie Villanueva	Bangon Pilipinas	1,125,878	3.12
Dick Gordon	Bagumbayan–VNP	501,727	1.39
Nicanor Perlas	Independent	54,575	0.15
Jamby Madrigal	Independent	46,489	0.13
John Carlos de los Reyes	Ang Kapatiran	44,244	0.12
Total		36,139,102	100.00
Valid votes		36,139,102	94.73
Invalid/blank votes (Note: Includes 181,985 votes for Vetellano Acosta (Kilusang Bagong Lipunan) who was disqualified after the ballots were printed.)		2,010,269	5.27
Total votes		38,149,371	100.00
Registered voters/turnout		51,317,073	74.34
Source: COMELEC

==== For Vice President ====
Candidate	Party	Votes	%
Jejomar Binay (Note: Running mate of Joseph Estrada (Pwersa ng Masang Pilipino))	PDP–Laban	14,645,574	41.65
Mar Roxas	Liberal Party	13,918,490	39.58
Loren Legarda (Note: Running mate of Manny Villar (Nacionalista Party))	Nationalist People's Coalition	4,294,664	12.21
Bayani Fernando	Bagumbayan–VNP	1,017,631	2.89
Edu Manzano	Lakas–Kampi–CMD	807,728	2.30
Perfecto Yasay Jr.	Bangon Pilipinas	364,652	1.04
Jay Sonza (Note: Running mate of Vetellano Acosta (Kilusang Bagong Lipunan) who was disqualified)	Kilusang Bagong Lipunan	64,230	0.18
Dominador Chipeco Jr.	Ang Kapatiran	52,562	0.15
Total		35,165,531	100.00
Valid votes		35,165,531	92.18
Invalid/blank votes		2,983,840	7.82
Total votes		38,149,371	–
Registered voters/turnout		51,317,073	74.34
Source: COMELEC

=== 2016 ===
In 2016, President Aquino's Liberal Party nominated former Secretary of the Interior and Local Government Mar Roxas (President Roxas's grandson) as their presidential candidate. Roxas had previously given way to Aquino in 2010. Davao City Mayor Rodrigo Duterte had previously denied running for president, only to have him substituted as PDP-Laban's candidate. Duterte defeated Roxas and three others in the election.

In the vice presidential election, House Representative from Camarines Sur Leni Robredo narrowly defeated senator Bongbong Marcos.

==== For President ====
Candidate	Party	Votes	%
Rodrigo Duterte	PDP–Laban	16,601,997	39.02
Mar Roxas	Liberal Party	9,978,175	23.45
Grace Poe	Independent	9,100,991	21.39
Jejomar Binay	United Nationalist Alliance	5,416,140	12.73
Miriam Defensor Santiago	People's Reform Party	1,455,532	3.42
Total		42,552,835	100.00
Valid votes		42,552,835	94.61
Invalid/blank votes (Note: Includes 25,779 votes for Roy Señeres (Partido ng Manggagawa at Magsasaka) who withdrew and died after the ballots were printed.)		2,426,316	5.39
Total votes		44,979,151	100.00
Registered voters/turnout		55,739,911	80.69
Source: Congress

==== For Vice President ====
Candidate	Party	Votes	%
Leni Robredo	Liberal Party	14,418,817	35.11
Bongbong Marcos (Note: Running mate of Miriam Defensor Santiago (People's Reform Party))	Independent (Note: Nacionalista Party member running as an independent)	14,155,344	34.47
Alan Peter Cayetano (Note: Running mate of Rodrigo Duterte (PDP–Laban))	Independent	5,903,379	14.38
Francis Escudero (Note: Running mate of Grace Poe (independent))	Independent	4,931,962	12.01
Antonio Trillanes (Note: Supporting Grace Poe (independent))	Independent	868,501	2.11
Gregorio Honasan	United Nationalist Alliance	788,881	1.92
Total		41,066,884	100.00
Valid votes		41,066,884	91.30
Invalid/blank votes		3,912,267	8.70
Total votes		44,979,151	100.00
Registered voters/turnout		55,739,911	80.69
Source: Congress

=== 2022 ===
The ruling PDP–Laban was split into two factions heading into the election. The titular head of one faction, president Rodrigo Duterte, pushed for the presidential ticket of senator Bong Go and himself. Another faction pushed for the presidential candidacy of senator Manny Pacquiao. In the end, neither faction using the "PDP–Laban" label to avoid complications, with Bong Go ultimately withdrawing as a presidential candidate of Pederalismo ng Dugong Dakilang Samahan. Sara Duterte, the president's daughter, then ran as the vice presidential running mate of Bongbong Marcos, while the Liberal Party-led opposition chose vice president Leni Robredo as its standard bearer. The Marcos–Duterte ticket won in a landslide, and the first majority mandates in the Fifth Republic era.

==== For President ====
Candidate	Party	Votes	%
Bongbong Marcos	Partido Federal ng Pilipinas	31,629,783	58.77
Leni Robredo	Independent (Note: Liberal Party member running as an independent)	15,035,773	27.94
Manny Pacquiao	PROMDI	3,663,113	6.81
Isko Moreno	Aksyon Demokratiko	1,933,909	3.59
Panfilo Lacson	Independent (Note: Originally ran under Partido para sa Demokratikong Reporma; resigned from the party mid-way through the campaign. Still labeled as a Reporma candidate on the official ballots.)	892,375	1.66
Faisal Mangondato	Katipunan ng Kamalayang Kayumanggi	301,629	0.56
Ernesto Abella	Independent	114,627	0.21
Leody de Guzman	Partido Lakas ng Masa	93,027	0.17
Norberto Gonzales	Partido Demokratiko Sosyalista ng Pilipinas	90,656	0.17
Jose Montemayor Jr.	Democratic Party of the Philippines	60,592	0.11
Total		53,815,484	100.00
Valid votes		53,815,484	96.05
Invalid/blank votes		2,213,371	3.95
Total votes		56,028,855	100.00
Registered voters/turnout		67,523,697	82.98
Source: Congress (vote totals); COMELEC (election day turnout, absentee turnout)

==== For Vice President ====
Candidate	Party	Votes	%
Sara Duterte (Note: Running mate of Bongbong Marcos (Partido Federal ng Pilipinas))	Lakas–CMD	32,208,417	61.53
Kiko Pangilinan (Note: Running mate of Leni Robredo (Independent))	Liberal Party	9,329,207	17.82
Tito Sotto (Note: Running mate of Panfilo Lacson (Independent))	Nationalist People's Coalition	8,251,267	15.76
Willie Ong	Aksyon Demokratiko	1,878,531	3.59
Lito Atienza	PROMDI	270,381	0.52
Manny SD Lopez	Labor Party Philippines	159,670	0.31
Walden Bello	Partido Lakas ng Masa	100,827	0.19
Carlos Serapio	Katipunan ng Kamalayang Kayumanggi	90,989	0.17
Rizalito David	Democratic Party of the Philippines	56,711	0.11
Total		52,346,000	100.00
Valid votes		52,346,000	93.43
Invalid/blank votes		3,682,855	6.57
Total votes		56,028,855	100.00
Registered voters/turnout		67,523,697	82.98
Source: Congress (vote totals); COMELEC (election day turnout, absentee turnout)

== Presidential candidates younger than 50 years old ==
The following are presidential candidates who are below 50 years old in the day of election day and their inauguration day. Emilio Aguinaldo was not included due to being elected indirectly.

Under the 1973 constitution, the president was required to be 50 years old or older. In the 1935 and 1987 constitutions, the president is required to be 40 years old or older.

President	Born	Age at election day	Age at start of presidency	Notes				
President	Born	Age at election day	Age at start of presidency	Ramon Magsaysay	August 31, 1907	46 years, 2 months, and 10 days November 10, 1953	46 years, 3 months, 29 days December 30, 1953	Youngest elected president
Manuel Manahan	October 20, 1918	41 years, 10 months, and 11 days November 12, 1957	Lost election	Youngest presidential candidate				
Ferdinand Marcos	September 11, 1917	48 years, 1 month, and 29 days November 9, 1965	48 years, 3 months, 19 days December 30, 1965	First time that two under-50 year old presidents faced each other (1965)				
Raul Manglapus	October 20, 1918	47 years, 0 months, and 20 days November 9, 1965	Lost election	First time that two under-50 year old presidents faced each other (1965)				
Miriam Defensor Santiago	June 15, 1945	46 years, 10 months, and 26 days May 11, 1992	Lost election	First attempt; Youngest female candidate in the presidential elections				
Gilbert Teodoro	June 14, 1964	45 years, 10 months, and 26 days May 10, 2010	Lost election					
Grace Poe	September 3, 1968	47 years, 8 months, and 6 days May 9, 2016	Lost election					
Isko Moreno	October 24, 1974	47 years, 6 months, and 15 days May 9, 2022	Lost election	Second time that two under-50 year old presidential candidates faced each other (2022)				
Manny Pacquiao	December 17, 1978	43 years, 4 months, and 22 days May 9, 2022	Lost election	Second time that two under-50 year old presidential candidates faced each other (2022)				
