= 1943 Philippine legislative election =

State elections in the Philippines

- September 20, 1943

All 54 elective seats and 54 ex officio members in the National Assembly of the Philippines
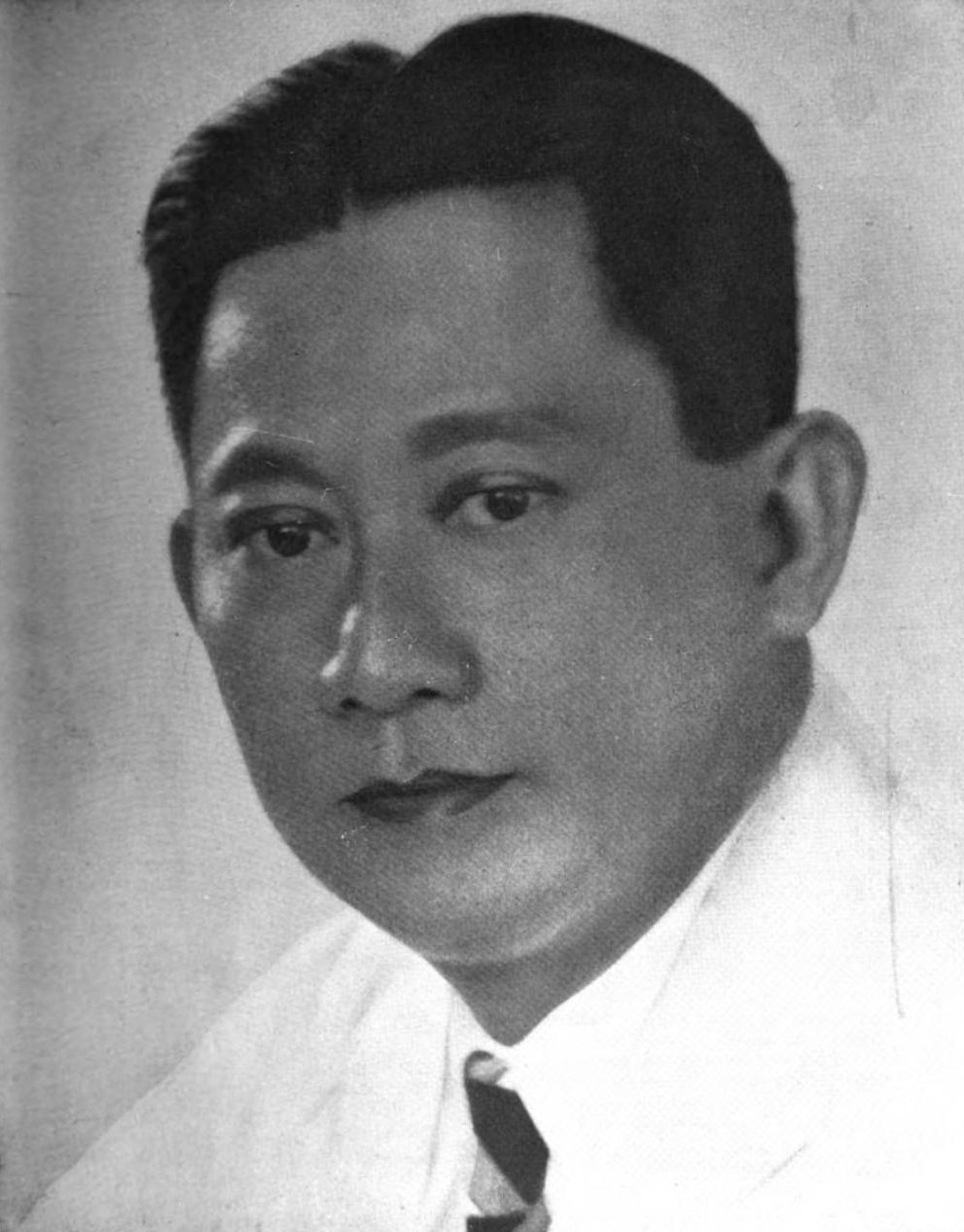
	Majority party
Leader	Benigno Aquino Sr.
Party	KALIBAPI
Leader's seat	Tarlac
Seats before	new party
Seats won	108
Seat change	▲108
Speaker before election
José Yulo
Nacionalista
Elected Speaker
Benigno Aquino Sr.
KALIBAPI

The 1943 Philippine legislative election was held on September 20, 1943 to elect the 54 of the 108 members of the National Assembly of the Second Philippine Republic.

== Electoral system ==
The 1943 Constitution provided for a unicameral National Assembly that was to be composed of provincial governors and city mayors as ex officio members and one delegate for every province and city who were to serve for a term of three years.

Members from the provinces were elected by the provincial, municipal and municipal district committees of the KALIBAPI, while members from the cities were elected by the city and city district committees. Candidates were required to be registered with the KALIBAPI provincial and city committees. Only members of the KALIBAPI provincial, municipal, municipal district, city and city districts were allowed to vote.

A simple plurality of the votes is needed for a candidate to be elected, and ties are resolved by drawing lots.

== Results ==
Party	Seats
KALIBAPI	54
Ex officio seats (Note: Ex officio members are governors from each province and mayors from some cities. All of these members are from the KALIBAPI.)	54
Total	108

== See also ==
- 1943 Philippine presidential election
