= List of vice presidents of the Philippines who ran for president =

Of the 15 officeholders who have served as vice president of the Philippines, five have attempted to run for the presidency after being elected to the position. Only two were elected president, while three lost their bids.

Emmanuel Pelaez, who served as vice president under Diosdado Macapagal, sought the Nacionalista Party's nomination to be its standard bearer for the 1965 elections, but lost to Ferdinand Marcos, who later won the presidency.

This list excludes the four vice presidents who assumed the presidency due to a vacancy and later ran for a full term. (Note: These vice presidents include Sergio Osmeña, Elpidio Quirino, Carlos P. Garcia, and Gloria Macapagal Arroyo.)

== List of vice presidents who ran for president ==
Vice presidents with the numbers of their popular votes in bold won the presidency.

Election year	Vice President (dates of service as vice president prior to presidential run)	Party/Coalition	President served under	Popular vote	Percentage	Place	Winner of election
1961	**Diosdado Macapagal** (Note: Ran as the incumbent vice president.) (December 30, 1957 – December 30, 1961)	Liberal	Carlos P. Garcia	**3,554,840**	**55.05%**	**1st**	**Himself**
1992	**Salvador Laurel** (February 25, 1986 – June 30, 1992)	Nacionalista	Corazon Aquino	770,046	3.40%	7th	Fidel V. Ramos
1998	**Joseph Estrada** (June 30, 1992 – June 30, 1998)	LAMMP	Fidel V. Ramos	**10,722,295**	**39.86%**	**1st**	**Himself**
2016	**Jejomar Binay** (June 30, 2010 – June 30, 2016)	UNA	Benigno Aquino III	5,416,140	12.73%	4th	Rodrigo Duterte
2022	**Leni Robredo** (June 30, 2016 – June 30, 2022)	Independent (Note: Liberal Party member who ran as an independent.)	Rodrigo Duterte	15,035,773	27.94%	2nd	Bongbong Marcos

== See also ==
- List of senators of the Philippines who ran for president
