= 1943 Philippine presidential election =

2nd indirect election of Philippine president

- September 25, 1943
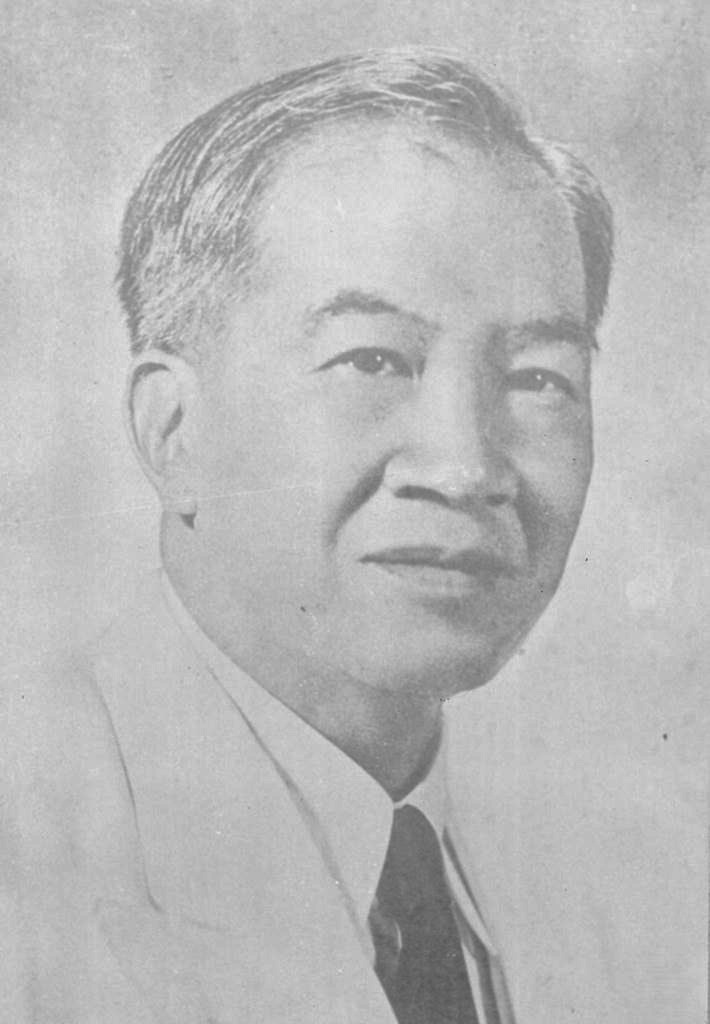
Nominee	Jose P. Laurel
Party	KALIBAPI
Electoral vote	108
President before election
None (de facto); Manuel L. Quezon (de jure)
Nacionalista
Elected President
Jose P. Laurel
KALIBAPI

Presidential elections were held in the Philippines on September 25, 1943, at the midst of World War II.

The Japanese-sponsored Second Philippine Republic merged all parties into the KALIBAPI, thereby creating a one-party state. All of the members of the National Assembly of the Second Philippine Republic, who were elected earlier in the week, were members of the KALIBAPI. Pursuant to the 1943 constitution, Jose P. Laurel was unanimously elected president by the National Assembly. Jorge B. Vargas originally wanted to run against Laurel, but acquiesced on election eve, and consequently campaigned for the latter. The Japanese also wanted Manuel Roxas to run, but he declined due to ill health for being incarcerated earlier in the year.

== Result ==
Candidate	Party	Votes	%
Jose P. Laurel	KALIBAPI	108	100.00
Total		108	100.00
Valid votes		108	100.00
Invalid/blank votes		0	0.00
Total votes		108	100.00
Registered voters/turnout		108	100.00

Laurel was inaugurated on October 14, 1943 at the Legislative Building in the City of Greater Manila.
