= 1973 Philippine martial law referendum =

Referendum on continuation of President Marcos's policies

July 1973 Philippine constitutional plebiscite
- July 27–28, 1973
- Do you want President Marcos to continue beyond 1973 and finish the reforms he has initiated under the martial law?
- Outcome: Proposal carried

Results
Choice	Votes	%
Yes	18,052,016	90.67%
No	1,856,744	9.33%
Total votes	19,908,760	100.00%

The 1973 Philippine martial law referendum was a national referendum in which the citizens' assemblies voted for:

- The ratification of the 1973 Constitution
- The suspension of the convening of the Interim National Assembly provided in the transitory provisions of the 1973 Constitution
- The continuation of martial law

The referendum was set from July 27 to July 28, 1973.

== Controversy ==
This referendum was marred with controversy. It is contested that there could not have been any valid referendum held from January 10 to January 15, 1973. Observers noted that many of the claimed 35,000 citizens' assemblies never met and voting was by show of hands.

== Results ==
Do you want President Marcos to continue beyond 1973 and finish the reforms he has initiated under the martial law?
Choice	Votes	%
Yes	18,052,016	90.67
No	1,856,744	9.33
Total	19,908,760	100.00
Source: Bureau of the Census and Statistics

1973 Philippine martial law referendum results (excluding invalid votes)
Yes; 18,052,016 (90.7%)
▲50%

=== By province/city ===
Province/City	Yes		No	
Province/City	Votes	%	Votes	%
Abra	74,740	99.83	126	0.17
Agusan del Norte	60,708	93.07	4,523	6.93
Agusan del Sur	100,674	94.16	6,245	5.84
Aklan	139,750	98.10	2,708	1.90
Albay	306,239	90.14	33,496	9.86
Angeles	106,320	99.10	963	0.90
Antique	119,172	87.75	16,633	12.25
Bacolod	165,681	96.59	5,856	3.41
Bago	42,293	96.11	1,713	3.89
Baguio	66,119	90.74	6,749	9.26
Bais	20,996	94.73	1,169	5.27
Basilan	37,233	90.23	4,033	9.77
Bataan	124,407	95.28	6,161	4.72
Batanes	5,766	96.94	182	3.06
Batangas	353,651	85.06	62,136	14.94
Batangas City	54,681	81.92	12,072	18.08
Benguet	89,859	90.86	9,036	9.14
Bohol	306,096	94.71	17,084	5.29
Bukidnon	192,559	85.06	33,815	14.94
Bulacan	474,315	86.56	73,651	13.44
Butuan	69,762	91.50	6,478	8.50
Cabanatuan	57,389	92.63	4,566	7.37
Cadiz	46,113	97.84	1,019	2.16
Cagayan	295,429	95.68	13,340	4.32
Cagayan de Oro	72,189	77.84	20,556	22.16
Calbayog	30,932	73.15	11,355	26.85
Caloocan	217,587	87.31	31,612	12.69
Camarines Norte	119,081	90.51	12,484	9.49
Camarines Sur	68,113	91.92	5,987	8.08
Camiguin	25,134	95.92	1,070	4.08
Canlaon	12,004	96.04	495	3.96
Capiz	157,155	94.21	9,665	5.79
Catanduanes	77,045	97.74	1,782	2.26
Cavite	256,449	95.54	11,981	4.46
Cavite City	48,487	93.32	3,467	6.67
Cebu	427,437	88.65	54,731	11.35
Cebu City	220,551	82.68	46,207	17.32
Cotabato	260,897	95.88	11,205	4.12
Cotabato City	35,487	83.49	7,019	15.51
Dagupan	50,135	97.35	1,367	2.66
Danao	29,398	99.98	7	0.02
Dapitan	6,674	96.51	241	3.49
Davao City	419,030	89.26	50,066	10.74
Davao del Norte	268,740	92.62	21,414	7.38
Davao del Sur	208,654	94.89	11,242	5.11
Davao Oriental	121,927	89.12	14,888	10.88
Dipolog	27,123	90.00	3,014	10.00
Dumaguete	27,307	81.30	6,280	18.70
Eastern Samar	33,279	70.97	13,611	29.03
General Santos	16,823	84.95	2,981	15.05
Gingoog	29,142	89.91	3,269	10.09
Ifugao	37,649	91.37	3,556	8.63
Iligan	56,700	90.24	46,131	9.76
Ilocos Norte	169,263	99.69	534	0.31
Ilocos Sur	206,616	95.97	8,686	4.03
Iloilo	261,608	95.67	11,846	4.33
Iloilo City	111,314	94.79	6,115	5.21
Iriga	27,432	95.38	1,329	4.62
Isabela	281,838	99.44	1,600	0.56
Kalinga-Apayao	73,820	98.37	1,224	1.63
La Carlota	22,881	99.09	211	0.91
La Union	208,549	97.51	5,317	2.49
Laguna	333,269	92.68	26,335	7.32
Lanao del Norte	156,787	91.96	13,706	8.04
Lanao del Sur	370,618	98.68	4,949	1.32
Laoag	38,299	96.64	1,330	3.36
Lapu-Lapu City	39,259	99.39	242	0.61
Legazpi City	45,346	95.20	2,284	4.80
Leyte	300,748	92.90	22,995	7.10
Lipa	51,105	91.24	4,909	8.76
Lucena	35,235	86.87	5,327	13.13
Mandaue	40,696	94.37	2,427	5.63
Manila	913,765	83.57	179,611	16.43
Marawi	40,340	88.61	5,185	11.39
Marinduque	96,596	91.17	9,360	8.83
Masbate	197,167	90.98	19,557	9.02
Misamis Occidental	78,406	87.83	10,863	12.17
Misamis Oriental	129,518	81.81	28,790	18.19
Mountain Province	32,393	94.33	1,946	5.67
Naga	37,930	84.49	6,964	15.51
Negros Occidental	376,721	97.76	8,646	2.24
Negros Oriental	220,963	89.26	26,576	10.74
Northern Samar	139,997	91.65	12,748	8.35
Nueva Ecija	352,820	94.64	19,982	5.36
Nueva Vizcaya	94,968	94.56	5,460	5.44
Occidental Mindoro	36,757	96.59	1,296	3.41
Olongapo	91,810	89.88	10,340	10.12
Oriental Mindoro	150,375	83.66	29,364	16.34
Ormoc	44,650	96.31	1,711	3.69
Oroquieta	16,368	76.13	5,133	23.87
Ozamiz	27,167	83.41	5,405	16.59
Pagadian	21,595	70.44	9,062	29.56
Palawan	16,762	81.42	3,824	18.58
Palayan	8,168	98.19	154	1.85
Pampanga	408,694	95.76	18,090	4.24
Pangasinan	680,996	99.51	3,357	0.49
Pasay	155,225	91.55	14,320	8.45
Puerto Princesa	1,046	90.02	116	9.98
Quezon	384,060	87.01	57,339	12.99
Quezon City	541,355	83.26	108,809	16.74
Quirino	26,851	90.24	2,904	9.76
Rizal	1,093,384	86.59	169,384	13.41
Romblon	60,069	77.51	17,430	22.49
Roxas	35,402	90.73	3,619	9.27
Samar	137,221	81.56	31,028	18.44
San Carlos, Negros Occidental	37,048	85.88	6,089	14.12
San Carlos, Pangasinan	45,608	99.98	8	0.02
San Jose	26,842	89.39	3,185	10.61
San Pablo	55,135	87.47	7,898	12.53
Silay	39,551	97.21	1,135	2.79
Siquijor	29,635	86.29	4,710	13.71
Sorsogon	178,232	90.88	17,894	9.12
South Cotabato	171,012	89.86	19,291	10.14
Southern Leyte	112,733	89.95	12,601	10.05
Sulu	69,240	84.37	12,823	15.63
Surigao City	33,721	92.16	2,868	7.84
Surigao del Norte	100,699	93.71	6,756	6.29
Surigao del Sur	119,130	93.40	8,412	6.60
Tacloban	38,590	91.10	3,772	8.90
Tagaytay	6,851	98.42	110	1.58
Tagbilaran	20,493	92.02	1,777	7.98
Tangub	11,768	85.39	2,013	14.61
Tarlac	299,983	96.38	10,625	3.42
Toledo	43,638	98.63	608	1.37
Trece Martires	2,982	93.98	191	6.02
Zambales	122,675	96.05	5,048	3.95
Zamboanga City	93,009	88.32	12,299	11.68
Zamboanga del Norte	130,833	90.86	13,163	9.14
Zamboanga del Sur	167,305	72.87	62,292	27.13
Total	18,052,016	90.67	1,856,744	9.33
Source: Bureau of the Census and Statistics

== See also ==
- Commission on Elections
- Politics of the Philippines
- Philippine elections
