= 1977 Philippine presidential referendum =

- December 16–17, 1977
- Do you vote that President Ferdinand E. Marcos continue in office as incumbent President and be Prime Minister after the organization of the Interim Batasang Pambansa as provided for in Amendment No. 3 of the 1976 Amendments to the Constitution?

Results
Choice	Votes	%
Yes	20,062,782	90.51%
No	2,104,209	9.49%
Valid votes	22,166,991	92.00%
Invalid or blank votes	1,927,236	8.00%
Total votes	24,094,227	100.00%
Registered voters/turnout	24,094,227	100%

A national referendum was called on December 16–17, 1977 where the majority of the voters voted that President Ferdinand Marcos should continue in office as incumbent President and Prime Minister after the organization of the Interim Batasang Pambansa.

== Results ==
Do you vote that President Ferdinand E. Marcos continue in office as incumbent president and be prime minister after the organization of the Interim Batasang Pambansa in 1978?
Choice	Votes	%
Yes	20,062,782	89.27
No	2,104,209	9.37
Abstain	1,927,236	1.33
Total votes	24,094,227	100.00

1977 Philippine presidential referendum results (excluding invalid votes)
Yes; 20,062,782 (90.5%)
▲50%

== See also ==
- Commission on Elections
- Politics of the Philippines
- Philippine elections
- Suffrage
