= 1935 Philippine general election =

- September 16, 1935
- Presidential election
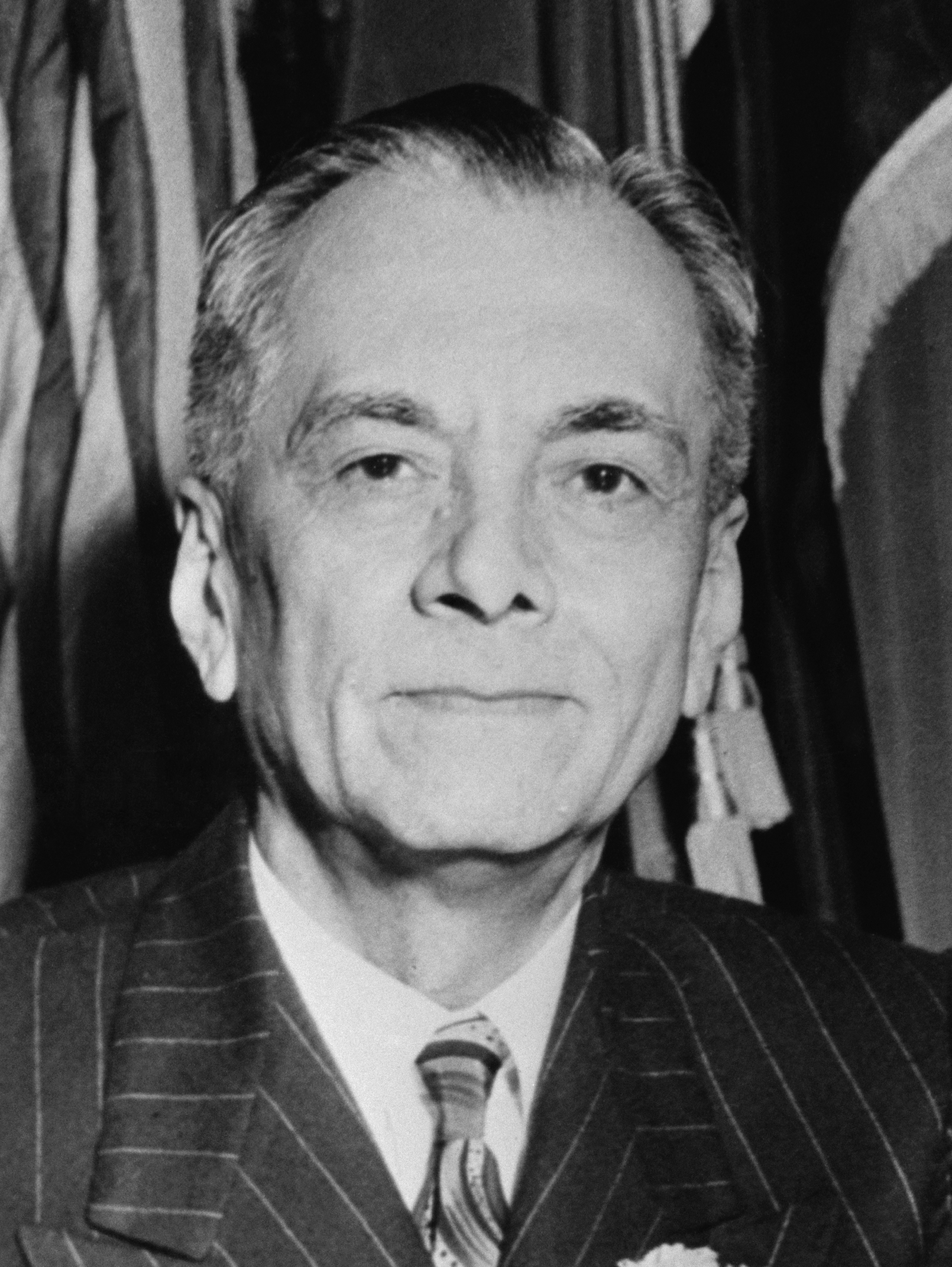

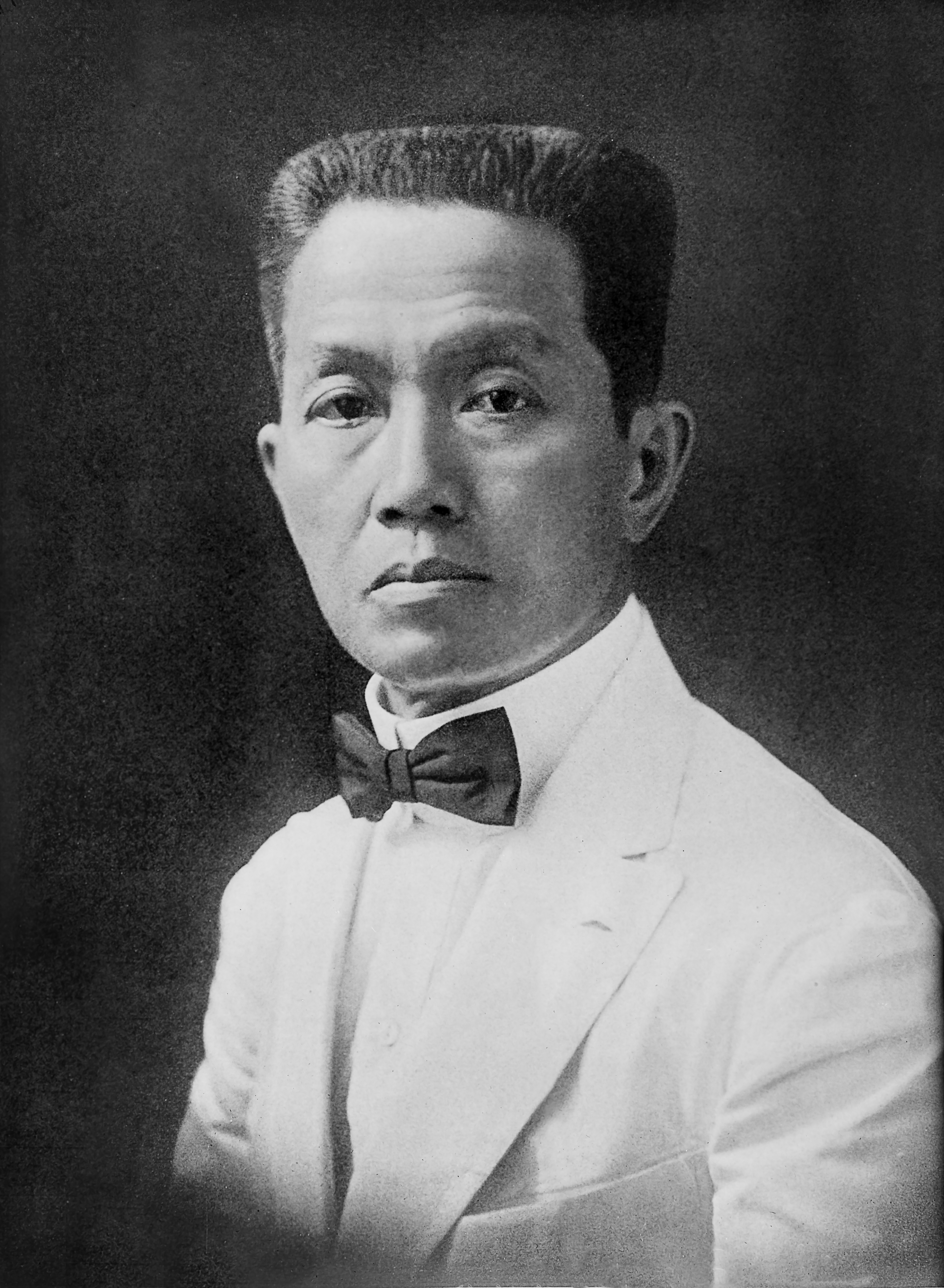

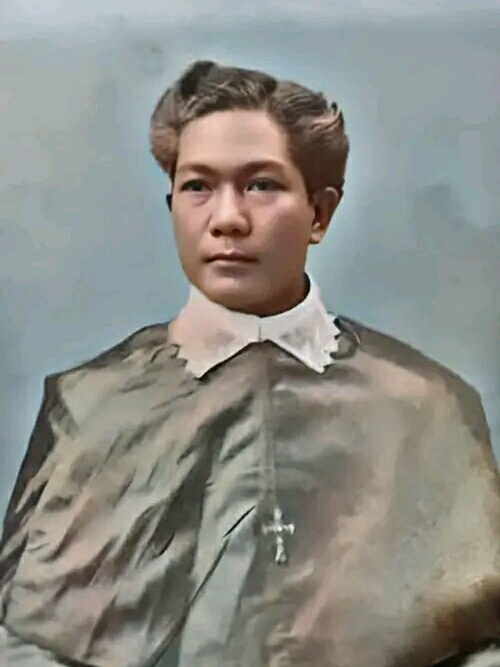
Candidate	Manuel Quezon	Emilio Aguinaldo	Gregorio Aglipay
Party	Nacionalista	National Socialist	Republican
Running mate	Sergio Osmeña	Raymundo Melliza	Norberto Nabong
Popular vote	695,332	179,349	148,010
Percentage	67.99%	17.54%	14.47%
Elected President
Manuel L. Quezon
Nacionalista
- Vice presidential election
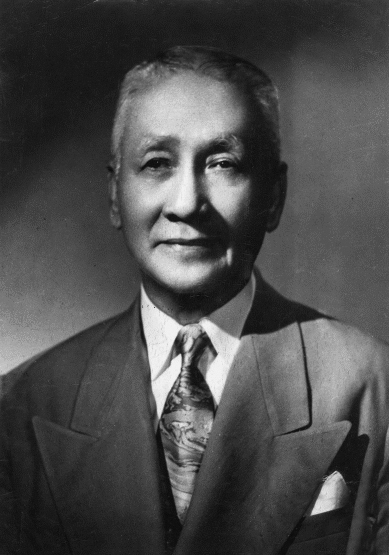

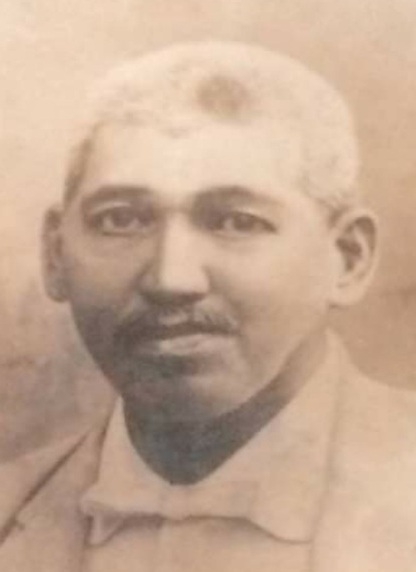

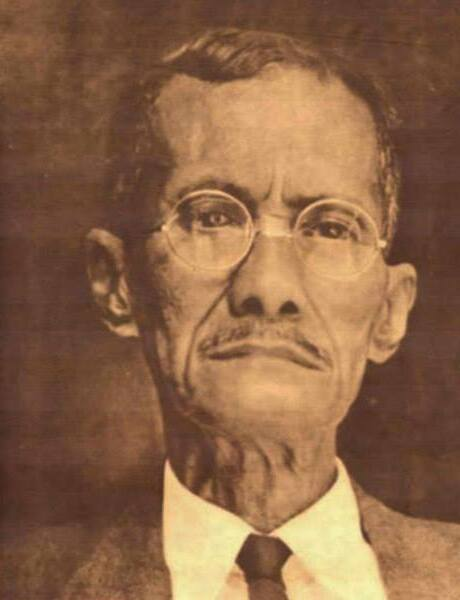
Candidate	Sergio Osmeña	Raymundo Melliza	Norberto Nabong
Party	Nacionalista	National Socialist	Republican
Popular vote	1,445,897	70,899	51,443
Percentage	90.24%	7.59%	5.50%
Elected Vice President
Sergio Osmeña
Nacionalista
- National Assembly election

All 98 seats in the House of Representatives of the Philippines 50 seats needed for a majority
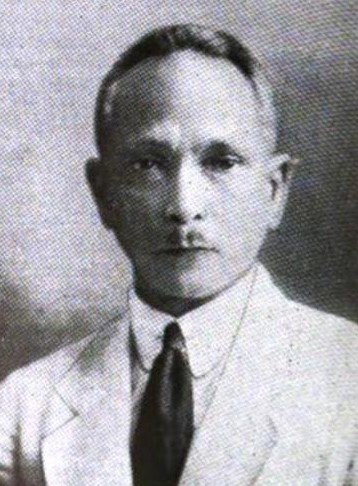

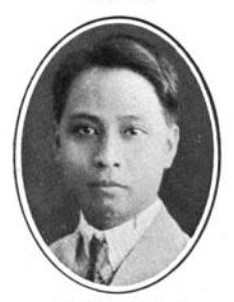
	First party	Second party
Leader	Gil Montilla	Manuel Roxas
Party	Nacionalista–Democratico	Nacionalista–Democrata Pro-Independencia
Leader's seat	Negros Occidental's–3rd	Capiz–1st
Seats won	64	19
Seat change	▼6	0
Speaker before election
Quintín Paredes
Nacionalista Democratico
Elected Speaker
Gil Montilla
Nacionalista Democratico

General elections were held in the Philippines on September 16, 1935 — the first general election of the Commonwealth of the Philippines. This was also the first direct election of the President of the Philippines and Vice President of the Philippines, positions created by the 1935 constitution. Furthermore, members of the National Assembly of the Philippines, that replaced the Philippine Legislature were elected.

The Nacionalista Party, which was split into two camps supporting Manuel L. Quezon and Sergio Osmeña, and reconciled prior to the election, maintained its electoral superiority, with Quezon winning the presidency, Osmeña the vice presidency, and majority of the National Assembly seats.

== Background ==
=== Drafting the Constitution ===
With the passage of Tydings–McDuffie Act in US Congress and its ratification in the Philippine Legislature, a constitutional convention is called by 1934 with its members elected by July. With the successful creation of the 1935 constitution, Presidency and Vice Presidency had been establish to replace the Governor-General. Also, both chambers of the Philippine Legislature has been cleared, with the creation of a unicameral National Assembly.

=== Quezon vs Aguinaldo ===
With former President Emilio Aguinaldo joined the race for presidency, Quezon campaigned against Aguinaldo by portraying the latter as the "one who destroyed revolution" with repeatedly using the assassinations of Supremo Andrés Bonifacio in 1897, and on General Antonio Luna in 1899. Quezon also allegedly paraded Bonifacio's bones. Aguinaldo is notable for supporting the late Governor-General Leonard Wood in 1920s against Quezon being against Wood's too much interference to the Philippine local government.

== Results ==
=== President ===
Candidate	Party	Votes	%
Manuel L. Quezon	Nacionalista Party	695,332	67.98
Emilio Aguinaldo	National Socialist Party	179,349	17.53
Gregorio Aglipay	Republican Party	148,010	14.47
Pascual Racuyal	Independent	158	0.02
Total		1,022,849	100.00

=== Vice president ===
Candidate	Party	Votes	%
Sergio Osmeña	Nacionalista Party	812,352	86.91
Raymundo Melliza	National Socialist Party	70,899	7.59
Norberto Nabong	Republican Party (Note: Member of the Partido Komunista ng Pilipinas carrying the Republican Party banner)	51,443	5.50
Total		934,694	100.00

=== National Assembly ===
Party	Seats	+/–
Nacionalista Democratico	64	New
Nacionalista Democrata Pro-Independencia	19	New
Independent	6	New
Total	89	−3
Source: Teehankee and PCDSPO

== Popular culture ==
The presidential election is featured in 2025 movie Quezon.
