= 1935 Philippine vice presidential election =

1st election of the Philippine vice president

- September 16, 1935
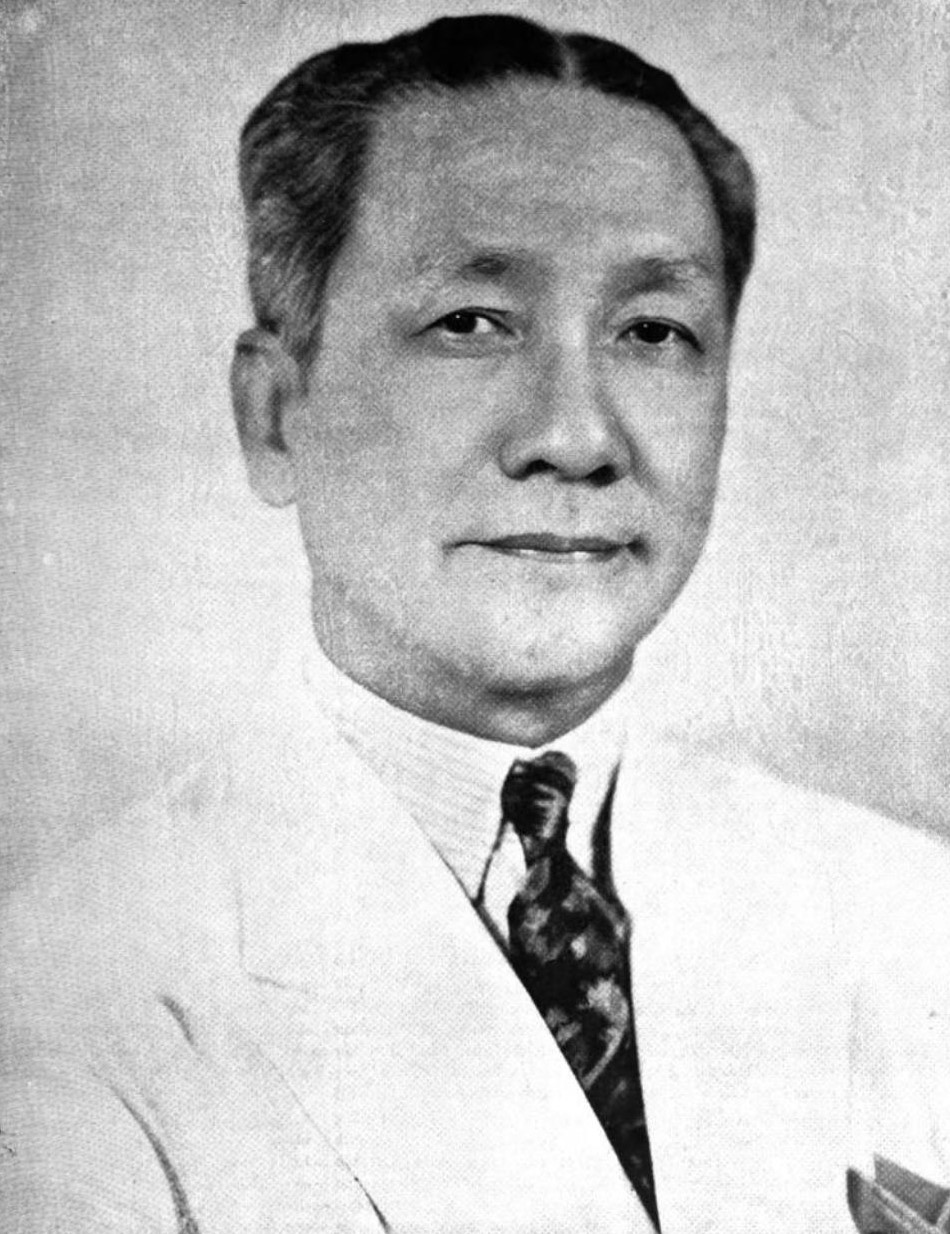

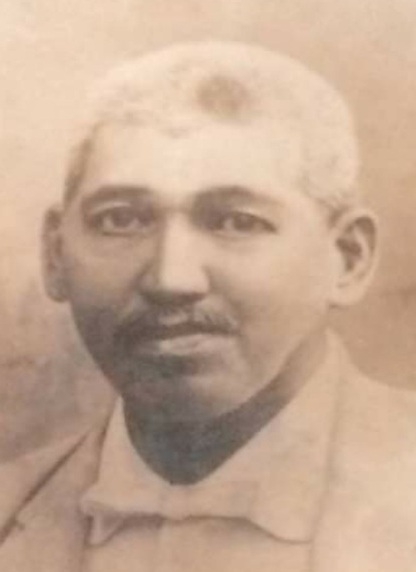

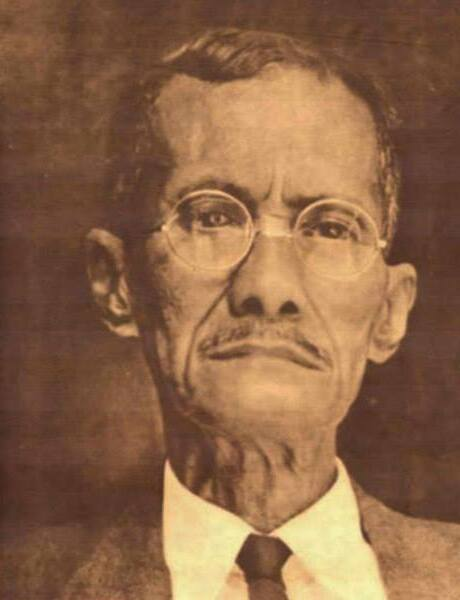
Nominee	Sergio Osmeña	Raymundo Melliza	Norberto Nabong
Party	Nacionalista	National Socialist	Republican
Running mate	Manuel L. Quezon	Emilio Aguinaldo	Gregorio Aglipay
Popular vote	812,352	70,899	51,443
Percentage	86.91%	7.59%	5.5%
Vice President before election
Office established
Elected Vice President
Sergio Osmeña
Nacionalista

Vice presidential elections were held in the Philippines on September 16, 1935. This was the first election since the enactment of the Tydings–McDuffie Act, a law that paved the way for a transitory government, as well as the first nationwide at-large election ever held in the Philippines. This was also the first vice presidential election in the country.

Senate President pro tempore Sergio Osmeña won a landslide victory against former Governor of Iloilo Raymundo Melliza and Manila Councilor Norberto Nabong, Osmeña won along with his presidential running mate Senate President Manuel L. Quezon.

These paragraphs are an excerpt from 1935 Philippine presidential election § Nominations.[edit]

== Nominations ==
=== Nacionalista Party nomination ===
==== Candidates gallery ====
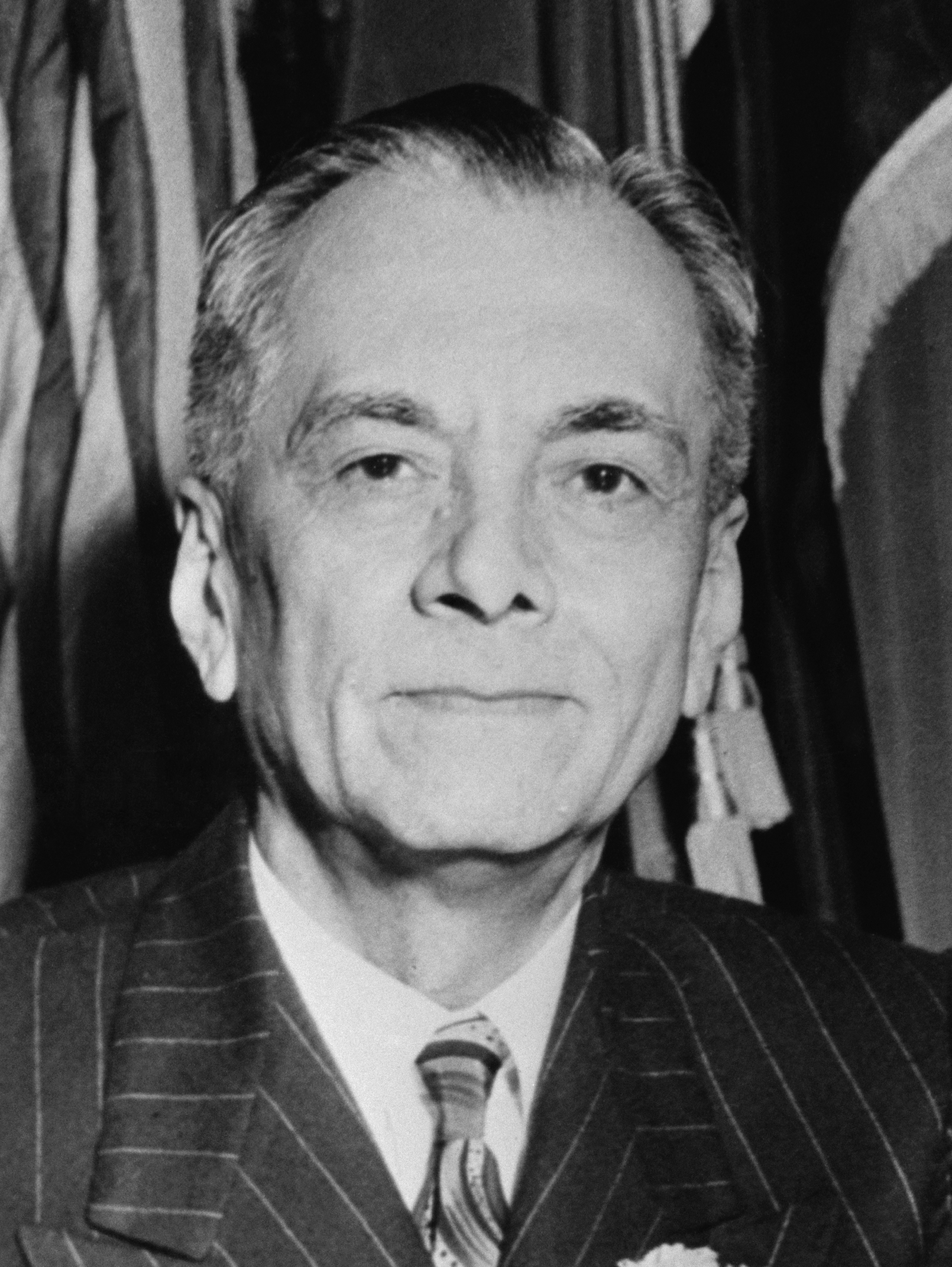
Senate President Manuel Luis Quezon

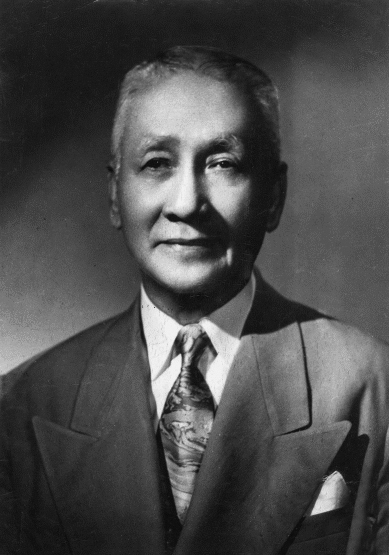
Senate President pro tempore Sergio Osmeña

After the passage of the Hare–Hawes–Cutting Act in the United States in 1933, only requiring approval of the Philippine legislature, the Nacionalista Party was split between the Quezon and Osmeña factions. The Quezon wing, known as the Partido Nacionalista Democratico or Partido Nacionalista Consolidado, was against the act. The Osmeña wing, known as the Partido Nacionalista Pro-Independencia or Partido Nacionalista Democrata Pro-Independencia, was for the passage of the act. Historian Teodoro Agoncillo pointed out that the main reason for Quezon's rejection of the act lay in his anticipation that Osmeña, whose efforts brought the passage of the Hare–Hawes–Cutting Act, might run as President of the transition government slated to be established before granting of independence, resulting to the relegation of himself as second in command once more. Due to Quezon's efforts in the legislature, the Philippines rejected the act and himself promised a better law than the one brought home by Osmeña. His mission to the United States brought forth the passage of the Tydings–McDuffie Act in March 1934, just three months away from the Philippine legislative election, 1934.

The general election on June 5, 1934, turned into a gauge on which wing was supreme. Both factions claimed the Nacionalista label and independence became the central issue. When the results came in, Quezon's wing proved better than that of Osmeña, at least in the national scale. Osmeña faction candidates still dominated the local scene. After the election, the idea of forming a coalition between the two factions, reuniting the old Nacionalista party once more, floated in public discussion.

House of Representatives		Senate	
Osmeña wing	70	Quezon wing	22
Quezon wing	19	Osmeña wing	2

On June 15, 1935, three months before the scheduled elections for the Commonwealth, both factions held their own national conventions, wherein Quezon was named candidate for president, and Osmeña was named candidate for vice president. According to historian Nick Joaquin, "Osmeña showed greatness in accepting the No. 2 role in a drama where he started out as protagonist." At this, the two factions reconciled as a unified Nacionalista party with an eight-point program.

=== National Socialist Party nomination ===
==== Candidates gallery ====
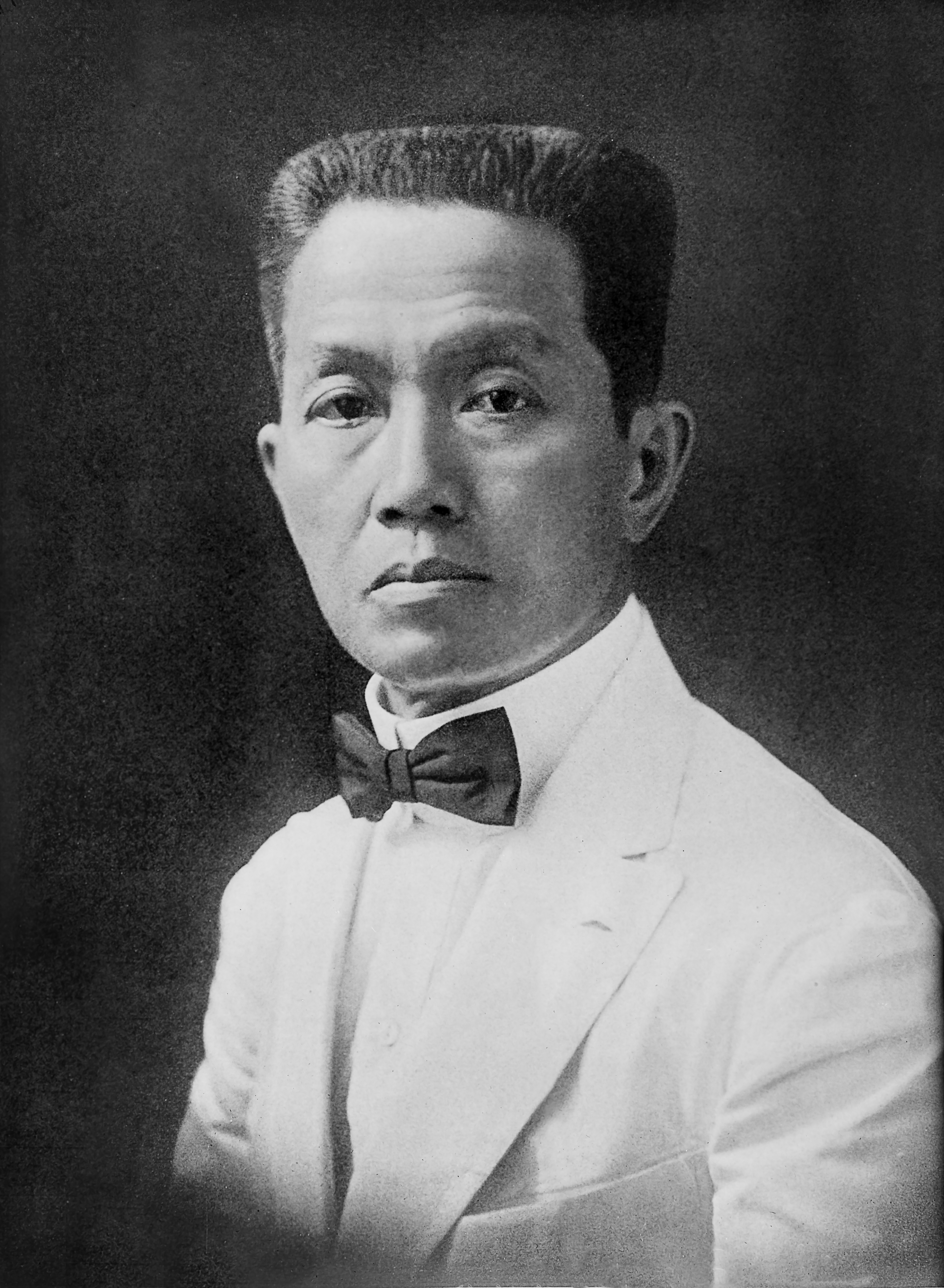
Former President Emilio Aguinaldo

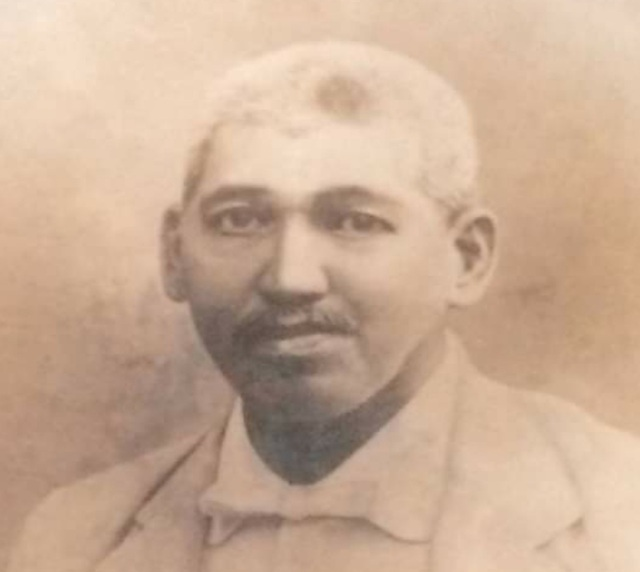
Former Governor of Iloilo Raymundo Melliza

Emilio Aguinaldo, who founded the National Socialist Party in 1934, announced his candidacy for president on June 2, 1935. Raymundo Melliza, former governor of Iloilo, was his running mate. Among those who supported his bid were Sixto Lopez, Anastacio Teodoro, judge Cayetano Lukban, Emiliano Tria Tirona, Narciso Lapuz, Vicente Sotto, and Miguel Cornejo. In Aguinaldo's acceptance speech at Cavite, Cavite, he addressed to an audience of around 5,000 his 44-point platform. His candidacy was also supported by the organization Veteranos de la Revolucion, formed during the administration of Governor-General Leonard Wood by remaining Filipino veterans of the Philippine Revolution and the Philippine–American War.

I do not have any political party behind me, my party is composed of the humble sons of the people, flattered before elections and forgotten after triumph. What more could I ask for?

– General Emilio Aguinaldo in his acceptance speech, June 1935.

Other parties that supported Aguinaldo's bid was the Partido Radical, a left-wing party formed in 1930 by Alfonso Mendoza, and Partido Filipinista, another party founded by Aguinaldo. Mendoza was then representative of Manila's second district.

=== Republican Party nomination ===
==== Candidates gallery ====
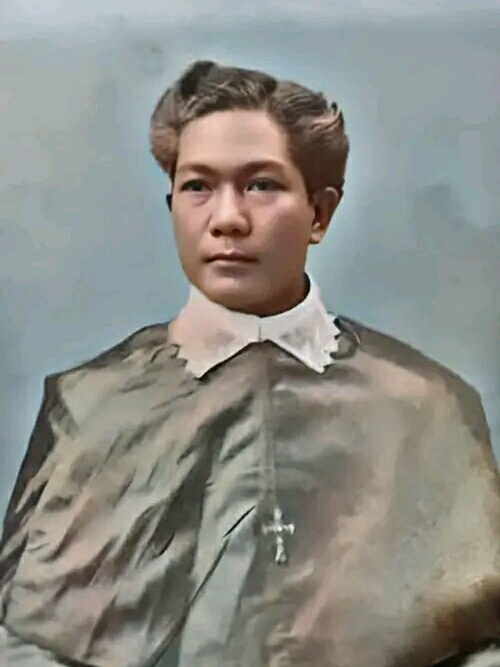
Supreme Bishop Gregorio Aglipay

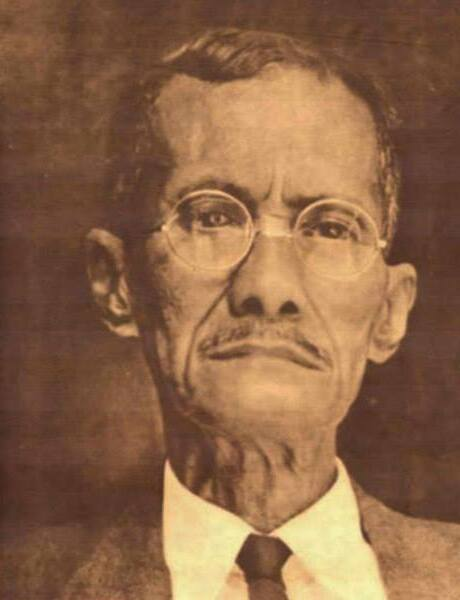
Manila Councilor Norberto Nabong

After his worldwide tour in 1934, wherein Aglipay went to Copenhagen to attend the 11th International Congress of Religious Liberals by the International Association for Religious Freedom (IARF), and even claimed to have interviewed Adolf Hitler and talked with Alejandro Lerroux, Prime Minister of Spain, and Edvard Beneš, President of Czechoslovakia, he expressed his intention to run as President of the Commonwealth. On June 19, 1935, Aglipay announced his candidacy, the last one to do so. Thus, Aglipay revived the Republican Party for this purpose, first organized in 1905 but collapsed after the 1907 elections. With this, he also launched his seven-point program.

I would consider myself unworthy of having been born a Filipino if my personal interests and the ties of friendship should prevent me from listening to the insistent popular clamor to vindicate with the powers of the highest office the constitutional liberties so arbitrarily trampled down by an abusive regime, and to cut the extravagant tentacles of the bureaucratic octopus that is sucking our public life.

– Bishop Gregorio Aglipay in his Manifesto of his candidacy, June 1935.

His bid was supported by the Partido Komunista ng Pilipinas (PKP), a left-wing party organized on November 7, 1930 by Crisanto Evangelista. The PKP fielded Norberto Nabong of Manila as Aglipay's running mate.

== Results ==
Candidate	Party	Votes	%
Sergio Osmeña	Nacionalista Party	812,352	86.91
Raymundo Melliza	National Socialist Party	70,899	7.59
Norberto Nabong	Republican Party (Note: Member of the Partido Komunista ng Pilipinas carrying the Republican Party banner)	51,443	5.50
Total		934,694	100.00

Popular vote
Osmeña	86.91%
Melliza	7.59%
Nabong	5.50%

=== Results per province ===
Province/City	Osmeña		Melliza		Nabong	
Province/City	Votes	%	Votes	%	Votes	%
Abra	7,052	98.08	4	0.06	134	1.86
Agusan	5,039	98.11	17	0.33	80	1.56
Albay	27,050	91.71	2,412	8.18	33	0.11
Antique	8,120	75.00	1,927	17.80	779	7.20
Bataan	5,230	70.25	1,417	19.03	798	10.72
Batanes	782	89.99	79	9.09	8	0.92
Batangas	25,754	90.30	2,649	9.29	118	0.41
Bohol	23,802	96.79	702	2.85	88	0.36
Bukidnon	1,801	100	0	0.00	0	0.00
Bulacan	23,576	76.39	6,589	21.35	698	2.26
Cagayan	16,797	87.21	735	3.82	1,728	8.97
Camarines Norte	4,789	75.20	1,579	24.80	0	0.00
Camarines Sur	20,116	91.62	1,748	7.96	91	0.41
Capiz	19,162	96.20	702	3.52	55	0.28
Cavite	10,518	49.30	10,651	49.93	165	0.77
Cebu	47,036	92.55	3,728	7.34	57	0.11
Cotabato	2,385	95.36	38	1.52	78	3.12
Davao	9,897	97.05	238	2.33	63	0.62
Ilocos Norte	9,741	72.02	3,728	27.56	57	0.42
Ilocos Sur	18,616	89.26	79	0.38	2,160	10.36
Iloilo	38,999	79.38	9,232	18.79	900	1.83
Isabela	11,567	81.31	402	2.83	2,256	15.86
La Union	16,134	94.89	260	1.53	609	3.58
Laguna	19,178	89.36	1,081	5.04	1,203	5.61
Lanao	6,565	98.92	33	0.50	39	0.59
Leyte	47,237	98.30	637	1.33	181	0.38
Manila	32,038	83.15	4,560	11.84	1,931	5.01
Marinduque	5,849	95.56	268	4.38	4	0.07
Masbate	7,950	95.79	340	4.10	9	0.11
Mindoro	6,422	86.06	925	12.40	115	1.54
Misamis Occidental	7,223	85.12	545	6.42	718	8.46
Misamis Oriental	9,305	96.50	160	1.66	177	1.84
Mountain Province	5,884	94.84	37	0.60	283	4.56
Negros Occidental	46,165	93.01	1,062	2.14	2,409	4.85
Negros Oriental	16,413	95.64	219	1.28	529	3.08
Nueva Ecija	21,496	71.65	4,271	14.24	4,236	14.12
Nueva Vizcaya	3,040	53.95	94	1.67	2,501	44.38
Palawan	4,579	91.69	412	8.25	3	0.06
Pampanga	25,672	88.02	2,052	7.04	1,443	4.95
Pangasinan	52,372	82.64	677	1.07	10,327	16.29
Rizal	31,364	85.39	3,548	9.66	1,820	4.95
Romblon	4,303	94.88	227	5.01	5	0.11
Samar	26,808	98.59	322	1.18	62	0.23
Sorsogon	16,258	91.11	1,572	8.81	14	0.08
Sulu	1,431	97.02	39	2.64	5	0.34
Surigao	10,068	97.13	211	2.04	87	0.84
Tarlac	12,763	76.02	450	2.68	3,577	21.30
Tayabas	24,384	94.16	1,180	4.56	331	1.28
Zambales	7,655	83.21	460	5.00	1,085	11.79
Zamboanga	11,061	97.16	306	2.69	17	0.15
Total	817,446	86.97	70,906	7.54	51,573	5.49
Source: Department of Agriculture and Commerce

== In popular culture ==
- Quezon, 2025 film about Manuel L. Quezon, culminating in the 1935 election.

== See also ==
- 1935 Philippine legislative election
- Commission on Elections
- Politics of the Philippines
- Elections in the Philippines
