= List of presidents of the Philippines by tickets =

This is a list of Philippine presidents by tickets. The list contains the candidates for the offices of President of the Philippines and Vice President of the Philippines that their parties have nominated since 1935.

This list only includes the major parties and coalitions during the elections and their closest rivals during the elections. For full results and candidates, see the list of Philippine presidential elections.

From the Commonwealth period to the last election prior the declaration of martial law, the major parties always split their ticket: one candidate was from Luzon and another either from the Visayas or Mindanao (the so-called "North-South" ticket). In the post-martial law period, this has been less pronounced as most candidates have been from Luzon. Only the elections in 2010, 2016, and 2022 have had a "North-South" ticket.

== List ==
This table includes presidential candidates who've either won 10% of the vote, or placed second, or whose vice presidential running mate won.

This doesn't include elections where only the presidency is on the ballot, nor candidates who had no running mates.

In 1935, there was no "administration ticket" as it was the first election, but the Nacionalista Party had control of the Philippine Legislature at this time, and was considered as the ruling party.

In 1992, there was no clear "administration ticket". Incumbent president Corazon Aquino endorsed the Lakas ticket of Fidel V. Ramos, but Congress was controlled by the LDP of Ramon Mitra, whom she originally endorsed. Both Lakas and LDP tickets are considered administration, while all other tickets were labeled as opposition tickets.

In 2022, the administration party, PDP–Laban, put up two presidential candidates in sequence, but both withdrew before ballots were printed.

Opposition tickets are ordered by number of votes for president.

Year	Administration ticket		Party	Province or city	Opposition ticket		Party	Province or city	Opposition ticket		Party	Province or city
1935	Pres	Manuel L. Quezon	Nacionalista	Tayabas	Pres	Emilio Aguinaldo	National Socialist	Cavite	Pres	Gregorio Aglipay	Republican	Ilocos Norte
1935	VP	Sergio Osmeña	Nacionalista	Cebu	VP	Raymundo Melliza	National Socialist	Iloilo	VP	Noberto Nabong	Republican	Manila
1941	Pres	Manuel L. Quezon	Nacionalista	Tayabas	Pres	Juan Sumulong	Popular Front	Rizal				
1941	VP	Sergio Osmeña	Nacionalista	Cebu	VP	Emilio Javier	Popular Front	Iloilo				
Japan invades the Philippines in 1941, then the Commonwealth establishes a government in exile. Japan sets up the Second Philippine Republic in 1943, with Jose P. Laurel as president. Manuel L. Quezon died in 1944 and was succeeded by Sergio Osmeña. Allied forces invade the Philippines in 1944 and re-establishes the Commonwealth government in 1945, and Second Republic was dissolved later that year.
1946	Pres	Sergio Osmeña	Nacionalista	Cebu	Pres	Manuel Roxas	Liberal	Capiz				
1946	VP	Eulogio Rodriguez	Nacionalista	Rizal	VP	Elpidio Quirino	Liberal	Ilocos Sur				
Philippines granted independence on July 4, 1946. Manuel Roxas died in 1949 and was succeeded by Elpidio Quirino.
1949	Pres	Elpidio Quirino	Liberal	Ilocos Sur	Pres	Jose P. Laurel	Nacionalista	Batangas	Pres	José Avelino	Liberal	Samar
1949	VP	Fernando Lopez	Liberal	Iloilo	VP	Manuel Briones	Nacionalista	Cebu	VP	Vicente J. Francisco	Liberal	Cavite
1953	Pres	Elpidio Quirino	Liberal	Ilocos Sur	Pres	Ramon Magsaysay	Nacionalista	Zambales	Pres			
1953	VP	José Yulo	Liberal	Negros Occidental	VP	Carlos P. Garcia	Nacionalista	Bohol	VP			
Ramon Magsaysay died in 1953 and was succeeded by Carlos P. Garcia.
1957	Pres	Carlos P. Garcia	Nacionalista	Bohol	Pres	José Yulo	Liberal	Negros Occidental	Pres	Manuel Manahan	Progressive	Manila
1957	VP	José Laurel Jr.	Nacionalista	Batangas	VP	Diosdado Macapagal	Liberal	Pampanga	VP	Vicente Araneta	Progressive	Negros Occidental
1961	Pres	Carlos P. Garcia	Nacionalista	Bohol	Pres	Diosdado Macapagal	Liberal	Pampanga				
1961	VP	Gil Puyat	Nacionalista	Manila	VP	Emmanuel Pelaez	Liberal	Misamis Oriental				
1965	Pres	Diosdado Macapagal	Liberal	Pampanga	Pres	Ferdinand Marcos	Nacionalista	Ilocos Norte	Pres	Raul Manglapus	Progressive	Manila
1965	VP	Gerardo Roxas	Liberal	Capiz	VP	Fernando Lopez	Nacionalista	Iloilo	VP	Manuel Manahan	Progressive	Manila
1969	Pres	Ferdinand Marcos	Nacionalista	Ilocos Norte	Pres	Sergio Osmeña Jr.	Liberal	Cebu				
1969	VP	Fernando Lopez	Nacionalista	Iloilo	VP	Genaro Magsaysay	Liberal	Zambales				
Ferdinand Marcos declared martial law in 1971, ruled by decree, and won a presidential election in 1981.
1986	Pres	Ferdinand Marcos	KBL	Ilocos Norte	Pres	Corazon Aquino	UNIDO	Tarlac				
1986	VP	Arturo Tolentino	KBL	Manila	VP	Salvador Laurel	UNIDO	Batangas				
People Power Revolution in 1986 deposed Ferdinand Marcos from power. Corazon Aquino assumed presidency after claiming victory in disputed election.
1992	Pres	Fidel V. Ramos	Lakas	Pangasinan	Pres	Miriam Defensor Santiago	PRP	Iloilo	Pres	Danding Cojuangco	NPC	Tarlac
1992	VP	Emilio Osmeña	Lakas	Cebu City	VP	Ramon Magsaysay Jr.	PRP	Zambales	VP	Joseph Estrada	NPC	San Juan
1992	Pres	Ramon Mitra Jr.	LDP	Palawan	Pres	Imelda Marcos	KBL	Leyte	Pres	Jovito Salonga	Liberal	Pasig
1992	VP	Marcelo Fernan	LDP	Cebu	VP	Vicente Magsaysay	KBL	Zambales	VP	Aquilino Pimentel Jr.	PDP–Laban	Cagayan de Oro
1998	Pres	Jose de Venecia Jr.	Lakas	Pangasinan	Pres	Joseph Estrada	LAMMP	San Juan	Pres	Raul Roco	Aksyon	Naga
1998	VP	Gloria Macapagal Arroyo	Lakas	Pampanga	VP	Edgardo Angara	LAMMP	Aurora	VP	Irene Santiago	Aksyon	Davao City
1998					Pres	Emilio Osmeña	PROMDI	Cebu City	Pres	Alfredo Lim	Liberal	Manila
1998					VP	Ismael Sueño	PROMDI	South Cotabato	VP	Serge Osmeña	Liberal	Cebu City
2001 EDSA Revolution deposed Joseph Estrada from power and was succeeded by Gloria Macapagal Arroyo.
2004	Pres	Gloria Macapagal Arroyo	Lakas	Pampanga	Pres	Fernando Poe Jr.	KNP	Pangasinan				
2004	VP	Noli de Castro	Independent	Oriental Mindoro	VP	Loren Legarda	KNP	Malabon				
2010	Pres	Gilberto Teodoro	Lakas	Tarlac	Pres	Benigno Aquino III	Liberal	Tarlac	Pres	Joseph Estrada	PMP	San Juan
2010	VP	Edu Manzano	Lakas	Iloilo	VP	Mar Roxas	Liberal	Capiz	VP	Jejomar Binay	PDP–Laban	Makati
2010					Pres	Manuel Villar	Nacionalista	Las Piñas				
2010					VP	Loren Legarda	NPC	Malabon				
2016	Pres	Mar Roxas	Liberal	Capiz	Pres	Rodrigo Duterte	PDP–Laban	Davao City	Pres	Grace Poe	Independent	San Juan
2016	VP	Leni Robredo	Liberal	Naga	VP	Alan Peter Cayetano	Independent	Taguig	VP	Francis Escudero	Independent	Sorsogon
2016					Pres	Jejomar Binay	UNA	Makati				
2016					VP	Gregorio Honasan	UNA	Baguio				
2022	Pres	Bongbong Marcos	PFP	Ilocos Norte	Pres	Leni Robredo	Independent	Naga	Pres	Isko Moreno	Aksyon	Manila
2022	VP	Sara Duterte	Lakas	Davao City	VP	Francis Pangilinan	Liberal	Cavite	VP	Willie Ong	Aksyon	Makati
2022					Pres	Manny Pacquiao	PROMDI	Sarangani	Pres	Panfilo Lacson	Reporma (later Independent)	Cavite
2022					VP	Lito Atienza	PROMDI	Manila	VP	Tito Sotto	NPC	Quezon City

=== Per election ===
This only includes the top two or three tickets of the election.

==== 1935 ====
1935 Nacionalista Party ticket
Manuel Quezon	Sergio Osmeña
for President	for Vice President
Senator from the 5th district (1916 – 1935)	Senator from the 10th district (1922 – 1935)

1935 National Socialist Party ticket
Emilio Aguinaldo	Raymundo Melliza
for President	for Vice President
Former President (1899 – 1901)	Former Governor of Iloilo (1904 – 1906)

1935 Republican Party ticket
Gregorio Aglipay	Norberto Nabong
for President	for Vice President
Philippine Independent Church Supreme Bishop	Manila Councilor

==== 1941 ====
1941 Nacionalista Party ticket
Manuel Quezon	Sergio Osmeña
for President	for Vice President
President (Incumbent since 1935)	Vice president (Incumbent since 1935)

1941 Popular Front ticket
Juan Sumulong	Emilio Javier
for President	for Vice President
Former senator from the 4th district (1925 – 1935)	

==== 1946 ====
1946 Nacionalista Party ticket
Sergio Osmeña	Eulogio Rodriguez
for President	for Vice President
President (Incumbent since 1941)	Senator (1945 – 1947)

1946 Liberal Party ticket
Manuel Roxas	Elpidio Quirino
for President	for Vice President
Senate President (1945 – 1946)	Senator (1945 – 1946)

==== 1949 ====
1949 Liberal Party (Quirino wing) ticket
Elpidio Quirino	Fernando Lopez
for President	for Vice President
President (Incumbent since 1948)	Senator (Incumbent since 1947)

1949 Nacionalista Party ticket
Jose P. Laurel	Manuel Briones
for President	for Vice President
President (1943 – 1945)	Supreme Court Associate Justice

1949 Liberal Party (Avelino wing) ticket
José Avelino	Vicente Francisco
for President	for Vice President
Senator (Incumbent since 1946)	Senator (Incumbent since 1946)

==== 1953 ====
1953 Liberal Party ticket
Elpidio Quirino	Jose Yulo
for President	for Vice President
President (Incumbent since 1948)	Former Supreme Court Chief Justice (1942 – 1945)

1953 Nacionalista Party ticket
Ramon Magsaysay	Carlos P. Garcia
for President	for Vice President
Former Secretary of Defense (1950 – 1953)	Senator (1945 – 1953)

==== 1957 ====
1957 Nacionalista Party ticket
Carlos P. Garcia	Jose Laurel Jr.
for President	for Vice President
President (Incumbent since 1957)	Representative from Batangas (1941 – 1957)

1957 Liberal Party ticket
Jose Yulo	Diosdado Macapagal
for President	for Vice President
Former Supreme Court Chief Justice (1942 – 1945)	Representative from Pampanga (1949 – 1957)

1957 Progressive Party ticket
Manuel Manahan	Vicente Araneta
for President	for Vice President
Former Customs Commissioner	Businessman

==== 1961 ====
1961 Nacionalista Party ticket
Carlos P. Garcia	Gil Puyat
for President	for Vice President
President (Incumbent since 1957)	Senator (Incumbent since 1951)

1961 Liberal Party ticket
Diosdado Macapagal	Emmanuel Pelaez
for President	for Vice President
Vice president (Incumbent since 1957)	Representative from Misamis Occidental (1953 – 1959)

==== 1965 ====
1965 Liberal Party ticket
Diosdado Macapagal	Gerardo Roxas
for President	for Vice President
President (Incumbent since 1961)	Senator (Incumbent since 1963)

1965 Nacionalista Party ticket
Ferdinand Marcos	Fernando Lopez
for President	for Vice President
Senate President (1963 – 1965)	Former vice president (1949 – 1953)

1965 Progressive Party ticket
Raul Manglapus	Manuel Manahan
for President	for Vice President
Senator (Incumbent since 1961)	Senator (Incumbent since 1961)

==== 1969 ====
1969 Nacionalista Party ticket
Ferdinand Marcos	Fernando Lopez
for President	for Vice President
President (Incumbent since 1965)	Vice president (Incumbent since 1965)

1969 Liberal Party ticket
Sergio Osmeña Jr.	Genaro Magsaysay
for President	for Vice President
Senator (1965 – 1971)	Senator (1959 – 1969)

==== 1986 ====
1986 Kilusang Bagong Lipunan ticket
Ferdinand Marcos	Arturo Tolentino
for President	for Vice President
President (Incumbent since 1965)	Mambabatas Pambansa (1984 – 1986)

1986 United Nationalist Democratic Organization ticket
Corazon Aquino	Salvador Laurel
for President	for Vice President
Widow of assassinated Senator Benigno Aquino Jr.	Mambabatas Pambansa (1978 – 1983)

==== 1992 ====
1992 Lakas–National Union of Christian Democrats ticket
Fidel V. Ramos	Lito Osmeña
for President	for Vice President
Secretary of National Defense (1988 – 1991)	Governor of Cebu (1988 – 1992)

1992 People's Reform Party ticket
Miriam Defensor Santiago	Ramon Magsaysay Jr.
for President	for Vice President
Secretary of Agrarian Reform (1989 – 1990)	Representative from Zambales (1967 – 1969)

1992 Nationalist People's Coalition ticket
Danding Cojuangco	Joseph Estrada
for President	for Vice President
Governor of Tarlac (1967 – 1969)	Senator (1987 – 1992)

==== 1998 ====
1998 Lakas–Christian Muslim Democrats ticket
Jose de Venecia Jr.	Gloria Macapagal Arroyo
for President	for Vice President
Representative from Pangasinan (1987 – 1998)	Senator (1992 – 1998)

1998 Laban ng Makabayang Masang Pilipino ticket
Joseph Estrada	Edgardo Angara
for President	for Vice President
Vice president (Incumbent since 1992)	Senator (1987 – 1998)

==== 2004 ====
2004 Lakas–Christian Muslim Democrats ticket
Gloria Macapagal Arroyo	Noli de Castro
for President	for Vice President
President (Incumbent since 2001)	Senator (Incumbent since 2001)

2004 Koalisyon ng Nagkakaisang Pilipino ticket
Fernando Poe Jr.	Loren Legarda
for President	for Vice President
Actor	Senator (Incumbent since 1998)

==== 2010 ====
2010 Liberal Party ticket
Benigno Aquino III	Mar Roxas
for President	for Vice President
Senator (Incumbent since 2007)	Senator (Incumbent since 2004)
Campaign

2010 Pwersa ng Masang Pilipino/PDP–Laban ticket
Joseph Estrada	Jejomar Binay
for President	for Vice President
Former president (1998 – 2001)	Mayor of Makati (Incumbent since 2001)

==== 2016 ====
2016 PDP–Laban ticket
Rodrigo Duterte	Alan Peter Cayetano
for President	for Vice President
Mayor of Davao City (Incumbent since 2013)	Senator (Incumbent since 2007)
Campaign

2016 Liberal Party ticket
Mar Roxas	Leni Robredo
for President	for Vice President
Secretary of the Interior and Local Government (2012 – 2015)	Representative from Camarines Sur (Incumbent since 2013)
Campaign

==== 2022 ====
2022 UniTeam ticket
Bongbong Marcos	Sara Duterte
for President	for Vice President
Former senator (2010 – 2016)	Mayor of Davao City (Incumbent since 2016)
Campaign

2022 Team Robredo–Pangilinan ticket
Leni Robredo	Francis Pangilinan
for President	for Vice President
Vice president (Incumbent since 2016)	Senator (Incumbent since 2016)
Campaign

== Maps ==
- Only those include above are listed. The larger pog refers to the presidential candidate.

=== Commonwealth elections ===
- Green: Nacionalista Party
- Blue: Nationalist Socialist Party
- Red: Democratic Party
- Pink: Popular Front
- Yellow: Liberal Party

1935	1941	1946
List of presidents of the Philippines by tickets is located in Philippines	List of presidents of the Philippines by tickets is located in Philippines	List of presidents of the Philippines by tickets is located in Philippines

=== Third Republic elections ===
- Green: Nacionalista Party
- Yellow: Liberal Party
- Purple: Progressive Party

1949	1953	1957
List of presidents of the Philippines by tickets is located in Philippines	List of presidents of the Philippines by tickets is located in Philippines	List of presidents of the Philippines by tickets is located in Philippines
1961	1965	1969
List of presidents of the Philippines by tickets is located in Philippines	List of presidents of the Philippines by tickets is located in Philippines	List of presidents of the Philippines by tickets is located in Philippines

=== Fourth Republic elections ===
- Red: KBL
- Bright yellow: UNIDO

1986	List of presidents of the Philippines by tickets is located in Philippines

=== Fifth Republic elections ===
If ticket contains members from different parties, the presidential nominee's color is used.

- Cyan: Lakas
- Orange: LAMMP/KNP/PMP
- Blue: LDP
- Light green: NPC
- Bright yellow: PDP-Laban
- Red: KBL
- Pink: Aksyon
- Bright pink: PRP
- Turquoise: PROMDI
- Green: Nacionalista
- Yellow: Liberal

1992	1998	2004
List of presidents of the Philippines by tickets is located in Philippines	List of presidents of the Philippines by tickets is located in Philippines	List of presidents of the Philippines by tickets is located in Philippines
2010	2016	2022
List of presidents of the Philippines by tickets is located in Philippines	List of presidents of the Philippines by tickets is located in Philippines	
