= Congressional canvass for the 1969 Philippine presidential election =

The following is the official canvassing of votes by the Congress of the Philippines for the 1969 Philippine presidential election.

== Presidential election ==
Candidate	Party	Votes	%
Ferdinand Marcos	Nacionalista Party	5,017,343	62.24
Sergio Osmeña Jr.	Liberal Party	3,043,122	37.75
Pascual Racuyal	Independent	778	0.01
Segundo Baldovi	Partido ng Bansa	177	0.00
Pantaleon H. Panelo	Independent	123	0.00
German F. Villanueva	Independent	82	0.00
Gaudencio Bueno	New Leaf Party	44	0.00
Angel Comagon	Independent	35	0.00
Cesar Bulacan	Independent	31	0.00
Espiridion D. Buencamino	NP	23	0.00
Nic V. Garces	Philippine Pro-Socialist Party	23	0.00
Benito Jose	Independent	23	0.00
Total		8,061,804	100.00
Valid votes		8,061,804	98.28
Invalid/blank votes		140,989	1.72
Total votes		8,202,793	100.00
Registered voters/turnout		10,300,898	79.63
Source: Nohlen, Grotz, Hartmann, Hasall and Santos

Province/City	Marcos	Osmeña	Racuyal	Baldovi	Panelo	Villanueva	Bueno	Comagon	Bulacan	Buencamino	Garces	Jose
Abra	41,606	1,925	0	0	0	0	0	0	0	0	0	0
Agusan del Norte	24,015	16,722	0	0	0	0	0	0	0	0	0	0
Agusan del Sur	31,938	16,520	0	0	0	0	0	0	0	0	0	0
Aklan	38,492	28,609	3	0	0	0	0	0	0	0	0	0
Albay	84,071	46,145	3	2	0	0	2	0	0	0	1	1
Angeles	7,212	10,889	5	0	0	0	0	0	0	0	0	0
Antique	30,042	31,865	4	1	0	2	0	0	0	1	0	1
Bacolod City	25,998	23,797	5	24	0	0	0	0	0	0	4	0
Bago	8,483	9,290	0	0	0	0	0	0	1	0	0	0
Baguio	14,930	4,690	11	0	2	0	0	0	0	0	0	0
Bais	3,271	3,420	0	0	0	0	0	0	0	0	0	0
Basilan	7,536	7,704	0	0	0	1	0	0	0	0	0	0
Bataan	41,163	18,713	4	0	0	0	1	0	0	0	0	0
Batanes	3,526	1,029	0	0	0	0	0	0	0	0	0	0
Batangas	129,335	58,676	30	0	0	1	0	0	1	0	0	2
Batangas City	17,151	8,154	4	0	0	0	0	0	0	0	0	0
Benguet	19,752	11,698	9	110	4	1	1	0	0	0	1	0
Bohol	106,944	53,353	4	1	0	0	1	0	2	0	1	0
Bukidnon	28,431	24,130	1	0	0	1	1	0	0	1	0	0
Bulacan	136,701	95,369	99	1	85	1	0	4	5	0	0	2
Butuan	23,773	18,729	2	0	0	1	0	0	0	0	0	0
Cabanatuan	13,558	8,129	0	0	0	0	0	0	0	0	0	0
Cadiz	12,687	1,378	0	0	0	0	0	1	0	0	0	0
Cagayan	110,533	9,220	8	0	0	0	0	0	0	1	0	1
Cagayan de Oro	14,711	12,438	0	0	0	0	0	0	0	0	0	0
Calbayog	11,012	6,933	0	0	0	0	0	0	0	0	0	0
Caloocan	26,417	19,338	11	0	0	0	1	0	0	0	0	0
Camarines Norte	30,708	27,556	1	0	0	0	0	1	0	0	0	0
Camarines Sur	92,137	66,714	1	0	6	0	0	0	1	0	1	0
Camiguin	9,916	6,033	1	1	0	1	1	2	3	0	3	2
Canlaon	1,948	1,327	0	0	0	0	0	0	0	0	0	0
Capiz	44,152	26,642	0	0	0	0	0	0	0	0	0	0
Catanduanes	38,681	4,820	0	0	0	0	0	0	0	0	0	0
Cavite	65,686	49,663	1	0	0	0	0	0	0	0	0	0
Cavite City	8,492	6,735	4	0	0	0	0	0	0	0	0	0
Cebu	156,091	117,283	0	0	0	0	0	0	0	0	0	0
Cebu City	33,392	48,984	5	0	0	0	0	0	0	0	0	0
Cotabato	100,336	65,900	2	0	0	0	0	0	0	0	0	0
Cotabato City	7,801	2,914	1	0	0	1	0	0	0	0	0	0
Dagupan	12,836	9,649	4	0	0	0	0	0	0	0	0	0
Danao	15,416	877	2	0	0	0	0	0	0	0	0	0
Dapitan	7,234	2,550	0	0	0	0	0	0	0	0	0	0
Davao City	44,999	25,594	13	0	0	0	0	0	0	0	0	0
Davao del Norte	52,088	25,419	3	0	0	1	0	0	1	0	0	0
Davao del Sur	35,054	21,311	0	0	0	0	0	0	0	0	0	0
Davao Oriental	29,749	12,838	0	0	0	0	0	0	0	0	0	0
Dumaguete	7,224	6,769	9	0	0	0	0	0	0	0	0	0
Eastern Samar	36,457	19,231	0	0	0	0	0	0	0	0	0	0
General Santos	7,758	7,472	0	0	0	0	0	0	0	0	0	0
Gingoog	6,769	6,172	0	0	0	0	0	0	0	0	0	0
Ifugao	6,927	5,521	1	0	0	0	0	1	1	0	0	0
Iligan	9,486	13,827	3	0	0	0	1	0	0	0	0	0
Ilocos Norte	80,631	1,215	0	0	0	0	0	0	0	0	0	0
Ilocos Sur	95,379	8,860	0	0	0	0	0	0	0	0	0	0
Iloilo	123,461	119,393	5	1	0	0	2	0	0	0	0	2
Iloilo City	29,096	27,015	8	0	0	0	0	0	0	1	0	0
Iriga	7,021	5,834	0	0	0	0	0	0	0	0	0	0
Isabela	91,299	24,932	1	0	0	0	1	1	0	0	0	0
Kalinga-Apayao	21,257	5,663	2	0	0	0	0	0	0	0	1	1
La Carlota	7,515	3,983	0	0	0	0	0	0	0	0	0	0
La Union	89,165	9,157	2	0	0	0	0	0	0	0	0	0
Laguna	102,766	57,730	6	1	0	2	8	0	0	0	1	0
Lanao del Norte	53,053	10,364	0	0	0	0	0	0	0	0	0	0
Lanao del Sur	45,696	35,199	0	0	0	0	0	0	0	0	0	0
Laoag	18,110	520	0	0	0	0	0	0	0	0	0	0
Lapu-Lapu	7,123	9,501	1	0	0	1	0	0	0	0	0	0
Legazpi	16,874	7,082	1	0	0	0	0	0	0	0	0	0
Leyte	134,680	72,055	1	0	0	1	0	0	0	0	0	0
Lipa	9,985	12,592	4	0	0	0	0	0	0	0	0	0
Lucena	10,043	8,028	2	0	0	0	0	0	0	0	0	0
Mandaue	5,751	6,804	2	0	0	0	0	0	0	0	0	0
Manila	182,956	153,541	158	2	7	4	3	8	4	2	1	2
Marawi	7,408	5,438	0	0	0	0	0	0	0	0	0	0
Marinduque	22,934	13,303	3	0	0	0	0	0	0	0	0	0
Masbate	45,662	39,994	0	0	0	0	0	0	0	0	0	0
Misamis Occidental	41,323	19,407	1	0	0	1	0	0	0	2	0	0
Misamis Oriental	33,242	25,518	2	0	1	1	1	0	0	0	0	1
Mountain Province	9,981	4,518	3	0	0	0	1	0	0	1	0	0
Naga	8,372	6,889	1	0	6	0	1	0	0	0	0	0
Negros Occidental	114,154	84,178	0	1	0	0	0	0	0	0	0	0
Negros Oriental	62,944	47,667	0	1	1	1	0	0	0	1	1	0
Northern Samar	29,544	28,337	0	0	0	0	0	0	0	0	0	0
Nueva Ecija	113,667	54,776	6	5	0	9	1	0	1	0	1	1
Nueva Vizcaya	34,763	10,818	1	0	0	0	2	0	1	0	0	0
Occidental Mindoro	23,085	12,053	0	0	0	0	0	0	0	0	0	0
Olongapo	10,550	8,734	3	0	0	1	0	0	0	0	0	0
Oriental Mindoro	44,060	27,879	3	0	0	0	0	0	0	0	0	0
Ormoc	11,250	4,794	0	0	0	0	0	0	0	0	0	0
Ozamiz	11,032	8,700	2	0	0	0	0	0	0	0	0	0
Pagadian	6,399	4,576	0	0	0	0	0	0	0	0	0	0
Palawan	23,602	20,705	1	0	0	0	0	0	0	0	0	0
Palayan	1,686	493	0	0	0	0	0	0	0	0	0	0
Pampanga	34,801	85,292	2	15	0	0	1	0	0	0	0	0
Pangasinan	207,458	113,724	17	0	0	4	0	2	0	1	2	0
Pasay	24,714	19,838	13	1	0	0	0	4	0	1	1	0
Quezon	114,768	88,306	7	2	1	0	0	0	1	0	1	0
Quezon City	67,216	46,905	119	0	5	0	6	4	0	4	1	1
Rizal	192,410	142,726	110	4	2	1	0	2	8	3	0	2
Romblon	20,197	19,832	1	0	0	0	0	0	0	0	0	0
Roxas	8,316	9,387	0	0	0	0	0	0	0	0	0	0
San Carlos, Negros Occidental	7,831	8,661	0	0	0	0	0	0	0	0	0	0
San Carlos, Pangasinan	10,776	9,192	1	0	0	0	0	0	0	0	0	0
San Jose	8,903	2,253	3	0	0	0	1	0	0	0	0	0
San Pablo	16,142	12,402	7	0	0	1	0	0	0	0	0	0
Silay	14,144	6,583	2	0	0	0	0	0	0	0	0	0
Sorsogon	67,275	34,917	4	0	0	0	0	0	0	0	0	0
South Cotabato	36,110	25,738	0	0	0	0	0	1	0	0	0	0
Southern Leyte	37,629	22,379	0	1	0	0	0	0	0	0	0	0
Sulu	78,722	39,608	0	0	0	0	0	0	0	1	0	1
Surigao del Norte	56,683	8,857	0	0	0	0	0	1	0	0	0	0
Surigao del Sur	33,912	25,625	1	0	0	0	0	0	0	0	0	0
Tacloban	11,696	5,730	0	0	0	0	0	0	0	0	0	0
Tagaytay	1,165	1,937	0	0	0	0	0	0	0	0	0	0
Tagbilaran	5,839	3,783	4	0	0	0	0	0	0	0	0	1
Tangub	3,001	3,024	0	0	0	0	0	0	0	0	0	0
Tarlac	76,078	43,487	5	0	2	0	1	2	0	3	0	1
Toledo	9,874	8,171	1	0	0	0	0	0	0	0	0	0
Trece Martires	304	1,338	0	0	0	0	0	0	0	0	0	0
Western Samar	38,979	27,210	0	0	0	0	0	0	0	0	0	0
Zambales	41,622	18,440	0	0	0	42	5	0	1	0	1	0
Zamboanga City	17,481	11,250	3	0	0	1	1	1	0	0	0	0
Zamboanga del Norte	53,909	21,511	5	1	1	0	0	0	0	0	1	1
Zamboanga del Sur	57,244	36,107	0	2	0	1	0	0	0	0	0	0
Total	5,017,343	3,043,122	778	177	123	82	44	35	31	23	23	23
Province/City												
Province/City	Marcos	Osmeña	Racuyal	Baldovi	Panelo	Villanueva	Bueno	Comagon	Bulacan	Buencamino	Garces	Jose

== Vice presidential election ==
Candidate	Party	Votes	%
Fernando Lopez	Nacionalista Party	5,001,737	62.75
Genaro Magsaysay	Liberal Party	2,968,526	37.24
Victoriano Mallari	Partido ng Bansa	229	0.00
Modesto T. Jalandoni	Philippine Pro-Socialist Party	161	0.00
Total		7,970,653	100.00
Valid votes		7,970,653	97.17
Invalid/blank votes		232,140	2.83
Total votes		8,202,793	100.00
Registered voters/turnout		10,300,898	79.63
Source: Nohlen, Grotz, Hartmann, Hasall and Santos

Province/City	Lopez	Magsaysay	Mallari	Jalandoni
Abra	35,686	7,792	0	0
Agusan del Norte	22,033	18,124	0	0
Agusan del Sur	31,695	14,883	0	0
Aklan	41,895	24,789	2	5
Albay	78,640	49,727	12	1
Angeles	7,266	10,686	1	0
Antique	44,170	16,806	2	1
Bacolod City	34,849	14,723	0	2
Bago	9,700	7,912	0	1
Baguio	14,040	5,578	3	2
Bais	3,517	3,082	0	0
Basilan	8,101	6,654	1	1
Bataan	37,395	21,862	0	0
Batanes	3,384	894	0	0
Batangas	130,475	53,871	13	2
Batangas City	16,810	8,175	1	0
Benguet	18,121	13,095	1	0
Bohol	108,083	50,576	3	1
Bukidnon	28,574	23,377	0	3
Bulacan	141,156	89,255	2	3
Butuan	22,920	18,717	0	1
Cabanatuan	11,681	9,869	0	0
Cadiz	13,082	956	0	0
Cagayan	100,493	20,505	56	1
Cagayan de Oro	15,755	11,205	0	0
Calbayog	11,075	6,545	0	0
Caloocan	25,651	19,913	0	0
Camarines Norte	29,045	28,790	0	0
Camarines Sur	92,270	64,396	0	0
Camiguin	9,650	5,726	8	6
Canlaon	1,900	1,320	0	0
Capiz	49,173	20,501	0	0
Catanduanes	38,102	5,089	1	0
Cavite	71,405	41,560	0	0
Cavite City	10,070	5,049	0	0
Cebu	161,459	105,754	0	0
Cebu City	38,383	43,550	1	0
Cotabato	113,276	49,373	5	27
Cotabato City	8,382	2,175	0	0
Dagupan	11,322	11,035	0	0
Danao	15,400	814	0	0
Dapitan	7,584	1,961	0	0
Davao City	49,073	21,133	0	0
Davao del Norte	52,425	24,417	1	1
Davao del Sur	35,628	20,289	0	0
Davao Oriental	28,614	13,571	1	2
Dumaguete	8,217	5,678	0	0
Eastern Samar	34,044	19,685	0	2
General Santos	7,501	7,638	0	2
Gingoog	6,011	6,722	0	0
Ifugao	6,503	5,726	2	2
Iligan	11,064	11,975	1	0
Ilocos Norte	75,199	6,106	0	0
Ilocos Sur	81,543	20,781	2	0
Iloilo	178,651	61,320	2	5
Iloilo City	37,287	18,607	1	0
Iriga	7,421	5,256	0	0
Isabela	69,819	45,413	1	0
Kalinga-Apayao	17,594	8,190	1	2
La Carlota	8,732	2,637	0	0
La Union	77,730	19,911	0	0
Laguna	104,943	54,203	0	3
Lanao del Norte	50,543	10,800	0	0
Lanao del Sur	39,364	30,797	0	0
Laoag	16,968	1,599	0	0
Lapu-Lapu	6,929	9,377	1	1
Legazpi	16,046	7,701	0	0
Leyte	130,752	73,163	0	0
Lipa	10,017	11,856	0	1
Lucena	11,294	6,682	0	0
Mandaue	6,005	6,483	0	0
Manila	199,609	136,318	20	14
Marawi	6,452	5,218	0	0
Marinduque	20,484	14,987	2	3
Masbate	41,699	41,913	0	0
Misamis Occidental	41,142	18,710	1	2
Misamis Oriental	31,320	26,055	0	4
Mountain Province	8,433	5,567	0	1
Naga	8,603	6,592	0	0
Negros Occidental	135,306	60,946	0	0
Negros Oriental	65,190	43,763	1	1
Northern Samar	27,758	28,874	0	0
Nueva Ecija	96,258	70,513	3	0
Nueva Vizcaya	25,824	19,554	0	0
Occidental Mindoro	21,561	13,207	0	0
Olongapo	10,800	8,418	0	0
Oriental Mindoro	40,544	30,578	0	0
Ormoc	11,182	4,726	0	0
Ozamiz	11,102	8,274	1	0
Pagadian	6,386	4,461	0	0
Palawan	25,136	18,767	0	0
Palayan	1,197	965	0	0
Pampanga	35,865	103,176	25	3
Pangasinan	179,092	140,494	5	7
Pasay	28,191	16,222	3	0
Quezon	110,854	90,636	1	0
Quezon City	75,079	39,049	9	10
Rizal	207,285	126,384	9	8
Romblon	21,721	18,137	0	0
Roxas	9,552	7,942	0	0
San Carlos, Negros Occidental	8,989	7,269	0	0
San Carlos, Pangasinan	9,573	10,410	0	0
San Jose	7,341	3,776	0	0
San Pablo	16,940	11,330	0	0
Silay	16,222	4,317	0	0
Sorsogon	62,659	37,698	1	2
South Cotabato	39,116	22,054	2	0
Southern Leyte	37,244	22,311	2	0
Sulu	74,654	37,363	1	5
Surigao del Norte	52,904	11,967	0	2
Surigao del Sur	31,971	26,478	0	0
Tacloban	10,837	6,467	0	0
Tagaytay	1,472	1,505	0	0
Tagbilaran	6,108	3,467	0	0
Tangub	2,892	3,063	0	0
Tarlac	61,946	56,299	13	7
Toledo	10,020	7,763	0	0
Trece Martires	411	1,173	0	0
Western Samar	36,905	27,763	0	0
Zambales	21,678	38,170	1	1
Zamboanga City	18,069	10,182	3	4
Zamboanga del Norte	56,580	16,630	1	3
Zamboanga del Sur	53,996	36,245	0	6
Total	5,001,737	2,968,526	229	161
Province/City				
Province/City	Lopez	Magsaysay	Mallari	Jalandoni
