= Miguel Cornejo =

Filipino politician and lawyer (1888-1984)

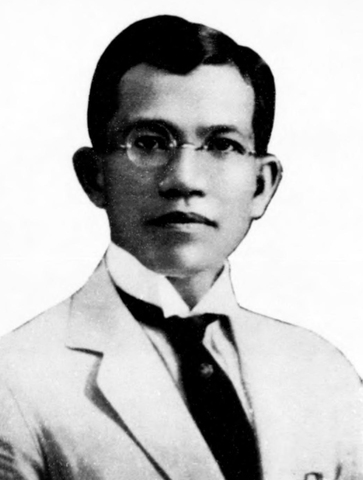
- Cornejo in 1939

Municipal President of Pasay
- In office 1928–1931
- Succeeded by: Moises San Juan
- In office 1919–1922
- Preceded by: Pascual Villanueva

Member of the House of Representatives from Mountain Province's at-large district
- In office October 27, 1922 – October 6, 1925
- Appointed by: Leonard Wood
- Preceded by: Juan Cariño
- Succeeded by: Juan Cailles

Personal details
- Born: Miguel Cornejo y Reyes; May 8, 1888 Manila, Captaincy General of the Philippines, Spanish East Indies
- Died: August 8, 1984 (aged 96) Manila, Philippines
- Party: National Socialist (1935–1936); Fascist Party (1930–1935); Independent (until 1930)
- Spouse(s): Crisanta Soldevilla Paulita San Agustin Vicente (m. 1974)
- Domestic partner(s): Rufina Tolentino; Miguela Barnes
- Occupation: Politician
- Profession: Lawyer
- Known for: Cornejo's Commonwealth Directory of the Philippines

Military service
- Allegiance: United States (Philippines) Philippine Islands
- Branch/service: United States Army
- Years of service: 1917-1918
- Rank: Brigadier (General)
- Battles/wars: World War I

Miguel Cornejo y Reyes (May 8, 1888 – August 8, 1984) was a Filipino soldier, politician, and lawyer. He served as municipal president of Pasay and representative from Mountain Province. During the American administration in the Philippines, and after independence, as an attorney and legislator he championed many causes. In 1939, he compiled and published the Cornejo's Commonwealth Directory of the Philippines, often used as an historical source for the period. Earlier in his career, he served in the Philippine National Guard (PNG) in World War I after legislative enactment of the Militia Act on March 17, 1917. After the war upon its disbandment, because the US territorial government did not authorize a Philippine army at the time, Miguel R. Cornejo, together with Manuel David, founded the military organization of the National Volunteers of the Philippines, leading as brigadier general. Descended from a prominent Spanish Filipino mestizo family, he spoke and authored many works in fluent Spanish, English and Tagalog. He married Crisanta Soldevilla of Gasan, Marinduque.

== Political career ==
Cornejo was a two-term municipal president (present-day equivalent of mayor) of Pasay, then a municipality in the province of Rizal. He was first elected municipal president in 1919. In 1922, at the end of his term as municipal president, he was elected Representative of Mountain Province's Lone District for the 6th Philippine Legislature. However, he did not finish his term as he was removed from office by the governor-general on October 6, 1925, after being convicted and sentenced to imprisonment for assaulting an American. In 1928, he became Municipal President of Pasay once again, serving until 1931.

During the 1930s, Cornejo was the leader of a minor fascist party, which in 1935 became one of the founding parties of the National Socialist Party. The party ran former Philippine president Emilio Aguinaldo as its candidate in the 1935 Philippine presidential election, which Aguinaldo lost to Nacionalista Party candidate Manuel L. Quezon.
