= 1935 Philippine legislative election =

- September 16, 1935

All 89 seats in the National Assembly of the Philippines 45 seats needed for a majority
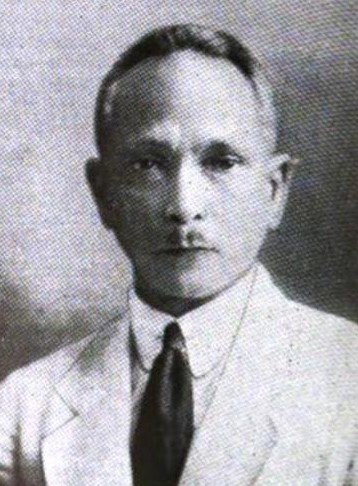

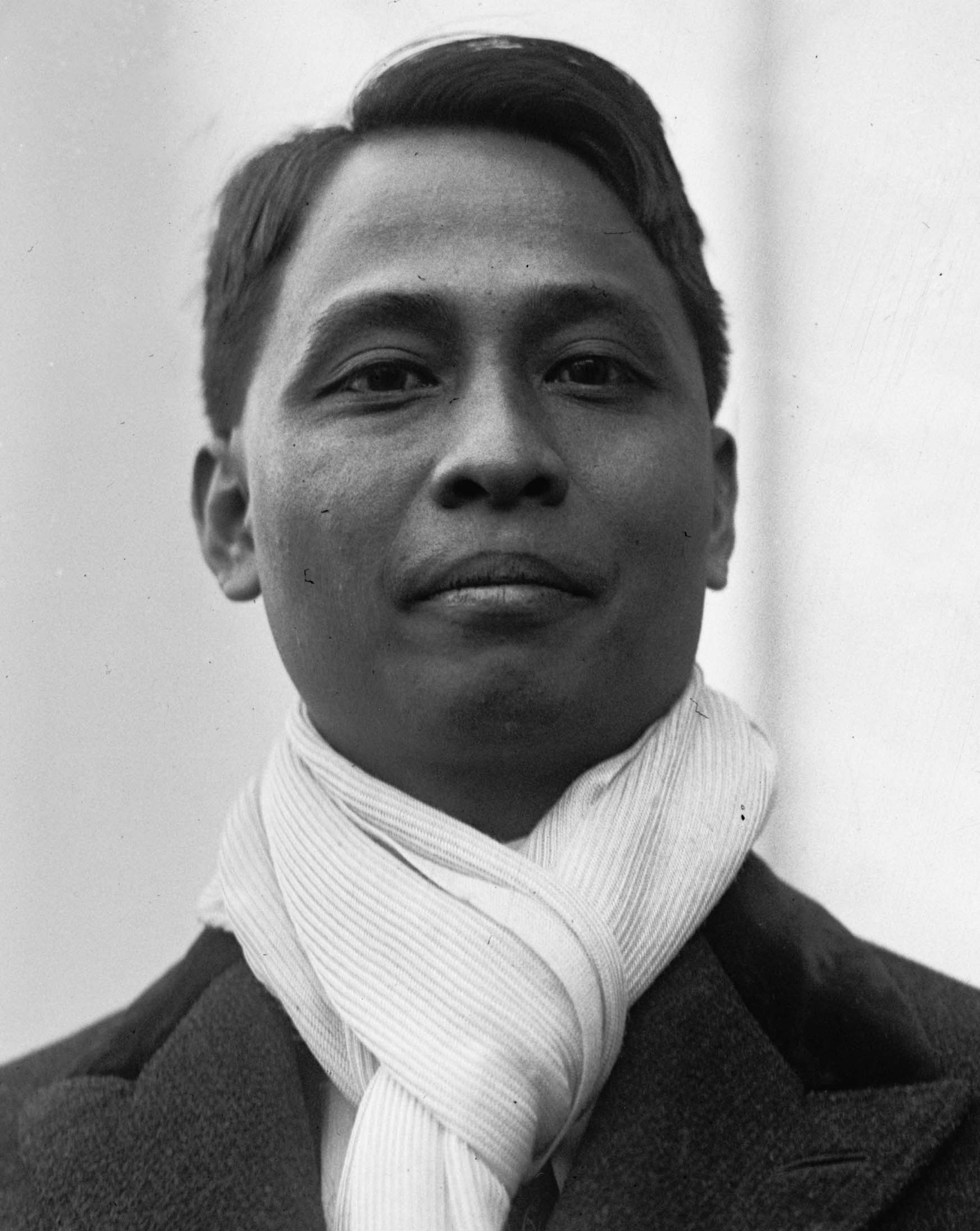
	Majority party	Minority party
Leader	Gil Montilla	Manuel Roxas
Party	Nacionalista Democratico	Nacionalista Democrata Pro-Independencia
Leader's seat	Negros Occidental–3rd	Capiz–1st
Last election	70	19
Seats won	64	19
Seat change	▼6	Steady
Speaker before election
Quintín Paredes
Nacionalista
Democratico
Elected Speaker
Gil Montilla
Nacionalista
Democratico

Elections for the members of the National Assembly were held on September 16, 1935, pursuant to the Tydings–McDuffie Act, which established the Commonwealth of the Philippines. The leaders of the ruling Nacionalista Party, Manuel Quezon and Sergio Osmeña reconciled and became running mates in the presidential election but their supporters, the Democraticos and the Democrata Pro-Independencias, respectively, effectively were two separate parties at the National Assembly elections. The elected members would serve from 1935 to 1938.

With the Senate abolished, the National Assembly became a unicameral legislature.

== Results ==
↓

64	19	6
Democratico	Pro-Independencia	Ind.

Party	Seats	+/–
Nacionalista Democratico	64	New
Nacionalista Democrata Pro-Independencia	19	New
Independent	6	New
Total	89	−3
Source: Teehankee and PCDSPO

== See also ==
- 1st National Assembly of the Philippines
- 1935 Philippine general election

== Bibliography ==
- Paras, Corazon L. (2000). The Presidents of the Senate of the Republic of the Philippines. ISBN 971-8832-24-6.
- Pobre, Cesar P. (2000). Philippine Legislature 100 Years. ISBN 971-92245-0-9.
