= Pascual Racuyal =

Filipino perennial politician

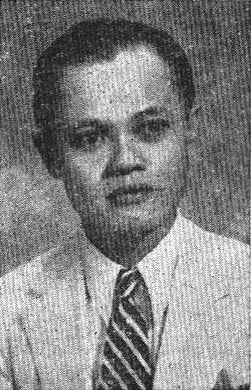
- Racuyal in 1949
- Born: 1911; Cebu City, Cebu, Insular Government of the Philippine Islands
- Died: 2004 (aged 92–93); Bulacan, Philippines
- Occupation: Mechanic
- Known for: Perennial presidential candidate
- Political party: Independent

Pascual Borbon Racuyal (1911, Tinago, Cebu City – 2004, Bulacan) was a Filipino eccentric and aspirant for the Philippine presidency, whose persistent attempts at the presidency earned him folk status. Racuyal sought the presidency in every Philippine presidential election beginning in 1935 against Manuel L. Quezon, Emilio Aguinaldo, and Gregorio Aglipay until 1986 (against Ferdinand Marcos and Corazon Aquino).

== Life and attempted political career ==
He grew up in Barangay Tinago in Cebu City and became a mechanic at an early age. He then moved to Manila and became interested in running for the presidency. Racuyal, a mechanic or garbage collector by profession, was never a credible political figure at any point in his life. His final attempt at the presidency in 1986 was stopped after the Commission on Elections disqualified him as a "nuisance candidate".

There were questions as to Racuyal's mental stability. Among his promises should he be elected to the presidency was to construct roads out of plastic to prevent their further deterioration. When he invited Manila Mayor Arsenio Lacson to be his running mate in the 1953 presidential elections, the latter called Racuyal "strictly fiction, utterly fantastic and incredible". Nonetheless, as time passed, his repeated candidacy provided for an amusing mild diversion to a frequently heated election atmosphere. In 1969 the Manila Times reported on Racuyal challenging President Marcos and Sen. Sergio Osmeña to a 12-hour debate in Plaza Miranda. Ignored, he then threatened to deliver a six-hour speech in Plaza Miranda, which promised to be the longest in modern Philippine history. It was also reported that when the election returns from Rizal province came in, Racuyal actually placed third after Marcos and Osmeña with 79 solid votes

Racuyal made it to the ballot twice. In 1935, he got 158 votes or less than 0.01% of the vote. In 1969, he got 778 votes, or just over 0.01% of the vote.

Racuyal died in 2004 in Bulacan and was buried at an undisclosed location.
