= Raymundo Melliza =

Filipino politician (1854–1945)

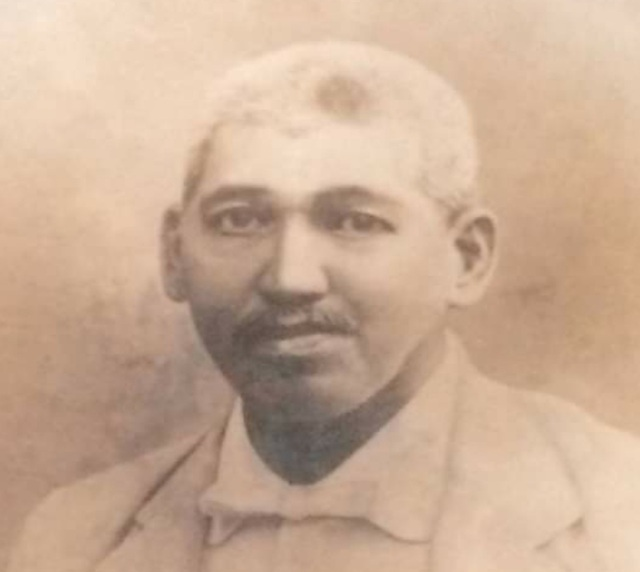

2nd Governor of Iloilo
- In office 1904–1906
- Preceded by: Martín Teófilo Delgado
- Succeeded by: Benito Lopez

Personal details
- Born: March 15, 1854 Molo, Iloilo City, Captaincy General of the Philippines
- Died: November 11, 1945 (aged 91) Molo, Iloilo City, Philippine Commonwealth
- Party: National Socialist (1935)
- Other political affiliations: Popular Front (1941)
- Education: University of Santo Tomas; University of Seville (LLL); Universidad Central de Madrid (LL.D)

Raymundo Angulo Melliza (March 15, 1854 – November 11, 1945) was a Filipino lawyer and politician who served as the second governor of Iloilo during the American occupation of the Philippines and was also an unsuccessful candidate for Vice President in the 1935 elections as a running-mate of former President Emilio Aguinaldo.

== Biography ==
Melliza received his bachelor's degree at the University of Santo Tomas in 1873. He then pursued further studies in Spain, receiving his Licentiate in Laws from the University of Seville in 1878 and a Doctor of Laws degree from the Universidad Central de Madrid in 1879. He then returned to the Philippines the following year. Prior to the Philippine Revolution, he worked as a judge in Bulacan and Ilocos Norte and was even appointed by the Spanish colonial government in Cuba to serve as secretary of the Real Audiencia de La Habana, the highest court in the island, in 1897, although it is uncertain whether he took up the post as he was replaced after just a few months.

During the Philippine Revolution, he participated in the Comité Conspirador, which overthrew the Spanish regime in Iloilo in 1898, and became president of the Federal State of the Visayas, a short-lived revolutionary government in Panay from 1898 to 1899. Reaching the rank of general himself, he helped support the installment of Martin Delgado as head of all revolutionary forces in the Visayas.

During the American occupation, Melliza served as Governor of Iloilo from 1904 to 1906. He then retired from politics until 1935, when he ran unsuccessfully as a candidate of the National Socialist Party for Vice President in elections for the Philippine Commonwealth as a running-mate of former President Emilio Aguinaldo, losing to Sergio Osmeña. In this effort, he was only able to win in Aguinaldo's bailiwick of Cavite. He ran again in the 1941 Philippine general election, this time as a senatorial candidate under the Popular Front ticket of Senator Juan Sumulong and Emilio Javier, but he was again unsuccessful, placing 37th in a field of 102 senatorial candidates.

Melliza was a resident of Molo, now a district of Iloilo City. His ancestral home is now a tourist attraction of the city.

== Supposed connection with Jose Rizal ==
Melliza was claimed to have been friends with the Philippines' national hero Jose Rizal, who supposedly stopped by Melliza's home in Molo to have lunch with him on his way to Manila from his exile in Dapitan to catch a ship that would take him to Cuba, where he planned to serve as a doctor, in 1896. Recent studies however, have cast doubt on the claim, citing numerous discrepancies and factual inaccuracies.

== Portrayals ==
Melliza was portrayed by Bodjie Pascua in the 2025 film Quezon.
