= Republican Party (Philippines) =

Defunct nationalist political party founded by Gregorio Aglipay

Republican Party Partido Republicano
- Leader: Gregorio Aglipay
- Founder: Isabelo de los Reyes
- Founded: 1905
- Dissolved: 1941
- Ideology: Filipino nationalism Land reform Populism

The Republican Party (Spanish: Partido Republicano, Tagalog: Lapiang Republicano) was a political party in the Philippines. It was founded by labour activist and writer Isabelo de los Reyes, whose leadership was shortly turned over to Gregorio Aglipay, the first Supreme Bishop of the Philippine Independent Church. Isabelo de los Reyes founded the party in 1905, with Gregorio Aglipay taking over the leadership shortly thereafter. Both were members of the Philippine Independent Church. The party was subsequently banned by the United States Insular Government after the 1907 elections. In the first ever nationwide at-large election held in the Philippines, the 1935 presidential election, Aglipay revived the Republican Party and was the last presidential candidate to announce his candidacy. The party was supported by the Coalition of the Oppressed Masses. This coalition originally included Emilio Aguinaldo and his National Socialist Party, but Aguinaldo split from the party and launched his own presidential campaign. Aglipay's party had connections with labor unions in Manila.

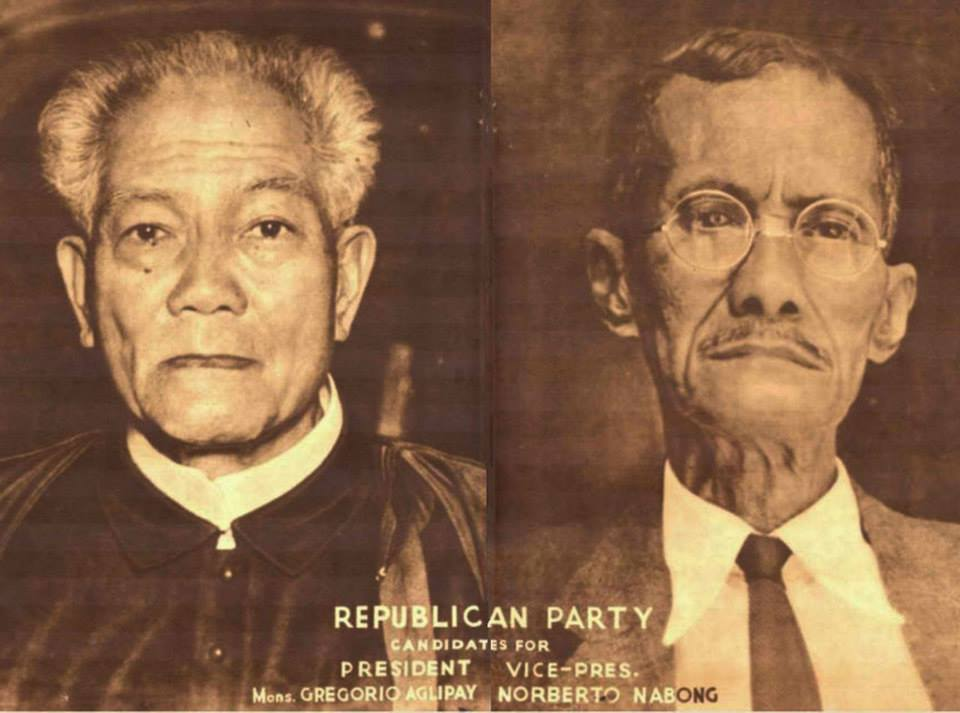
Aglipay as the presidential candidate of the Republican Party in the 1935 Philippine presidential election, with his running mate Norberto Nabong.

Aglipay's running mate was Manila councilor Norberto Nabong. Nabong was one of the founding members of the Partido Komunista ng Piilpinas, which was part of the Coalition of the Oppressed Masses. Nabong ran for vice president while being imprisoned. Aglipay's platform consisted of, among others, Philippine independence, land reforms, Filipinization of industries and recognizing Tagalog as the national language of the Philippines. Aglipay and Nabong were defeated by the Nacionalista Party's Manuel L. Quezon and Sergio Osmeña, respectively. Aglipay sent a congratulatory message to Quezon three days after the election when the results became apparent; though a day later, he announced, on behalf of the party, that electoral fraud had been committed, thereby seeking to void the election, and proposing that a new election be held. However, the party became dormant months following the election and Aglipay later focused on his clerical duties in his church until his death in 1940.

In the 1941 Philippine general election, the party became active again, this time fielding the late bishop's wife, Pilar V. Aglipay, for Vice-President. She was the vice presidential candidate for both the Popular Front (Abad Santos Wing) of presidential candidate Pedro Abad Santos, and the Partido Ganap de Filipinas of presidential candidate Celerino Tiongco. She participated in the election against incumbent Vice President Sergio Osmeña Sr. of the Nacionalista Party, Emilio M. Javier of the Popular Front (Sumulong Wing), and Pedro Yabut, an independent candidate. She placed third in the election, garnering 32,148 votes, or 2.01% of the total votes cast. The party then quietly dissolved following the election.

== Election results ==
Year	Presidential election				Vice presidential election			
Year	Candidate	Votes	%	Result	Candidate	Votes	%	Result
1935	Gregorio Aglipay	148,010	14.47	Manuel L. Quezon (Nacionalista)	Norberto Nabong	51,443	5.50	Sergio Osmeña (Nacionalista)
1941	Did not field a candidate			Manuel L. Quezon (Nacionalista)	Pilar V. Aglipay	32,148	2.01	Sergio Osmeña (Nacionalista)
