= 1935 Philippine presidential election =

1st election of Philippine president

- September 16, 1935
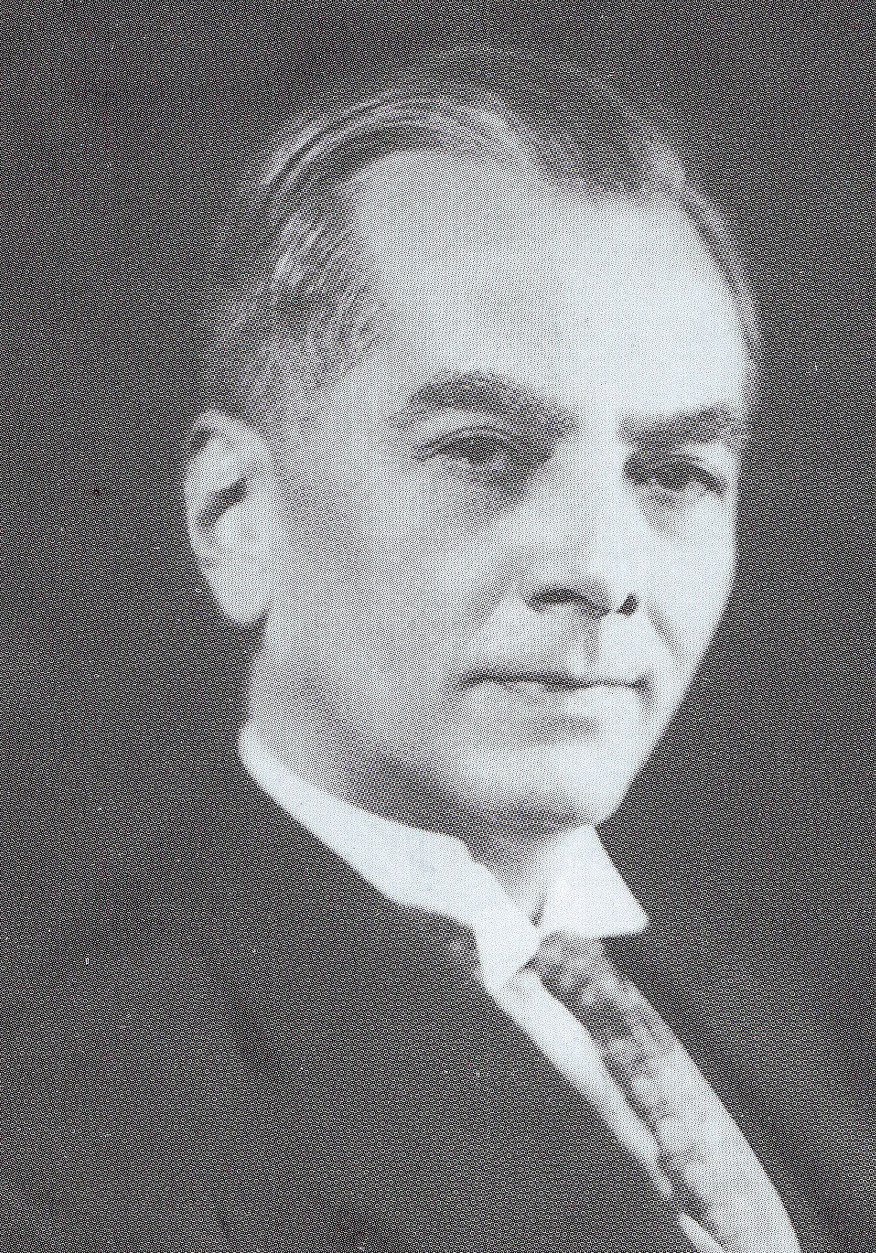

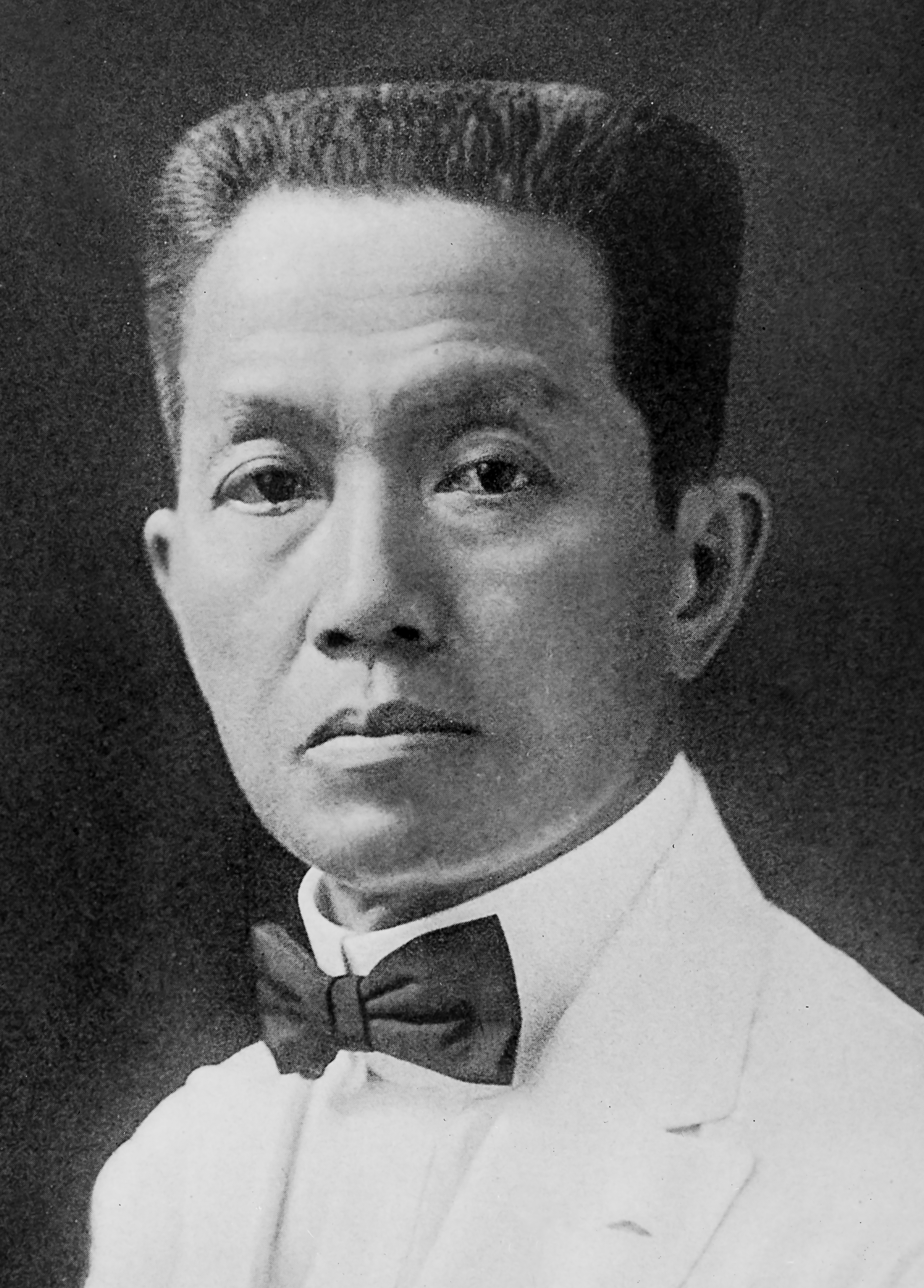

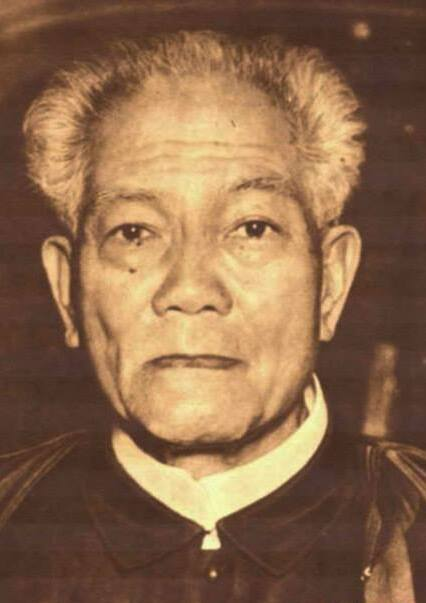
Nominee	Manuel L. Quezon	Emilio Aguinaldo	Gregorio Aglipay
Party	Nacionalista	National Socialist	Republican
Running mate	Sergio Osmeña	Raymundo Melliza	Norberto Nabong
Popular vote	695,332	179,349	148,010
Percentage	67.99%	17.54%	14.47%
President before election
None (last held by Emilio Aguinaldo)
None (Nonpartisan)
Elected President
Manuel L. Quezon
Nacionalista

Presidential elections were held in the Philippines on September 16, 1935. This was the first election since the enactment of the Tydings–McDuffie Act, a law that paved the way for a transitory government, as well as the first nationwide at-large election ever held in the Philippines.

Senate President Manuel Luis Quezon won a lopsided victory against former President Emilio Aguinaldo. His election victory was largely due to the weak political machinations of his rivals. Another losing contender was Gregorio Aglipay, co-founder and supreme bishop of the Iglesia Filipina Indepediente (Philippine Independent Church). Pascual Racuyal, a mechanic by profession, also ran for president as an independent. Quezon's running mate, Senate President Pro Tempore Sergio Osmeña won a more impressive victory as Vice President of the Philippines. He was said to have faced less effective candidates.

== Nominations ==
=== Nacionalista Party nomination ===
==== Candidates gallery ====
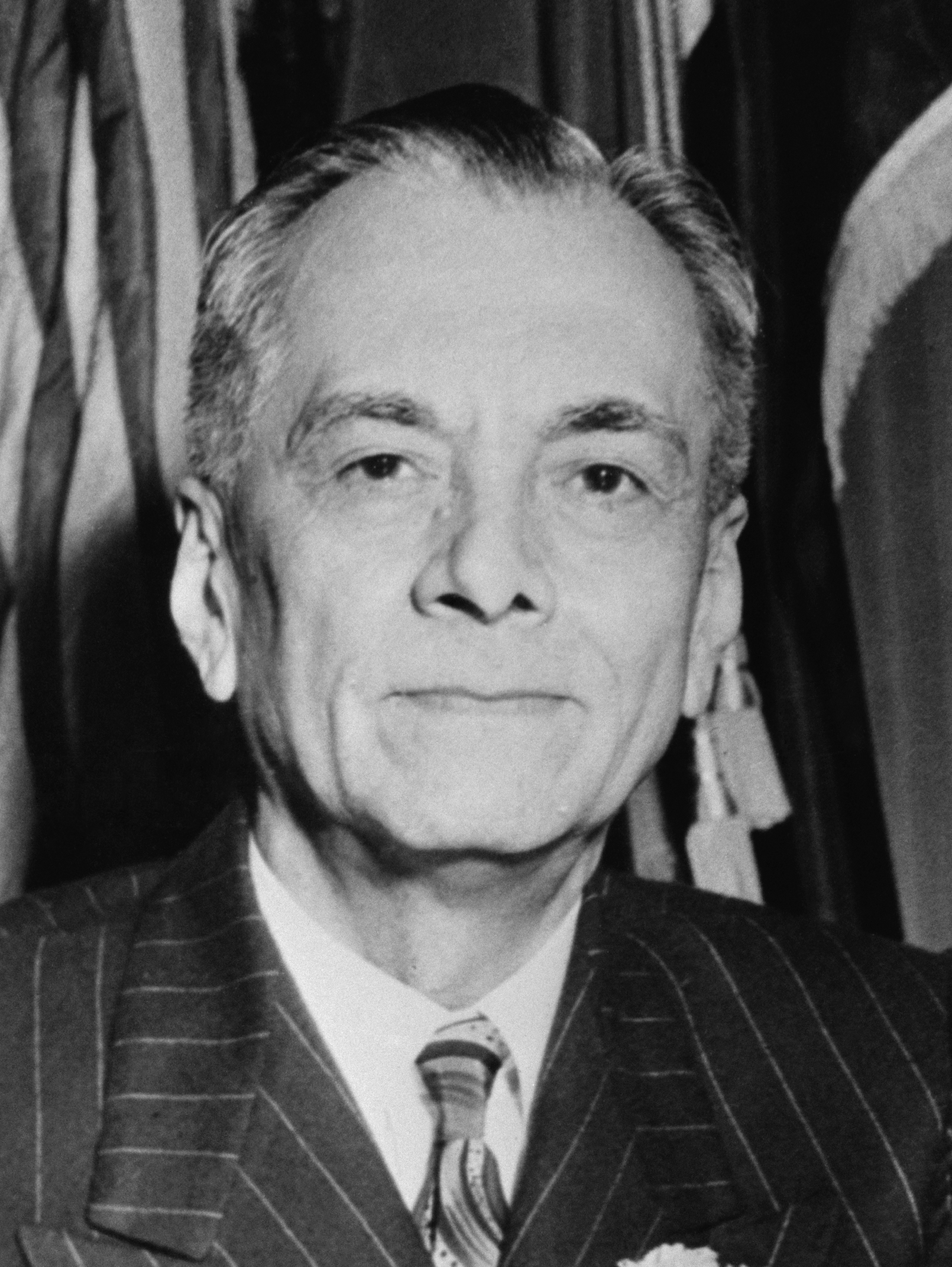
Senate President Manuel Luis Quezon

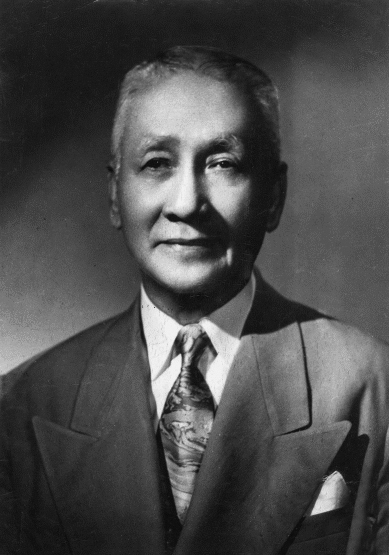
Senate President pro tempore Sergio Osmeña

After the passage of the Hare–Hawes–Cutting Act in the United States in 1933, only requiring approval of the Philippine legislature, the Nacionalista Party was split between the Quezon and Osmeña factions. The Quezon wing, known as the Partido Nacionalista Democratico or Partido Nacionalista Consolidado, was against the act. The Osmeña wing, known as the Partido Nacionalista Pro-Independencia or Partido Nacionalista Democrata Pro-Independencia, was for the passage of the act. Historian Teodoro Agoncillo pointed out that the main reason for Quezon's rejection of the act lay in his anticipation that Osmeña, whose efforts brought the passage of the Hare–Hawes–Cutting Act, might run as President of the transition government slated to be established before granting of independence, resulting to the relegation of himself as second in command once more. Due to Quezon's efforts in the legislature, the Philippines rejected the act and himself promised a better law than the one brought home by Osmeña. His mission to the United States brought forth the passage of the Tydings–McDuffie Act in March 1934, just three months away from the Philippine legislative election, 1934.

The general election on June 5, 1934, turned into a gauge on which wing was supreme. Both factions claimed the Nacionalista label and independence became the central issue. When the results came in, Quezon's wing proved better than that of Osmeña, at least in the national scale. Osmeña faction candidates still dominated the local scene. After the election, the idea of forming a coalition between the two factions, reuniting the old Nacionalista party once more, floated in public discussion.

House of Representatives		Senate	
Osmeña wing	70	Quezon wing	22
Quezon wing	19	Osmeña wing	2

On June 15, 1935, three months before the scheduled elections for the Commonwealth, both factions held their own national conventions, wherein Quezon was named candidate for president, and Osmeña was named candidate for vice president. According to historian Nick Joaquin, "Osmeña showed greatness in accepting the No. 2 role in a drama where he started out as protagonist." At this, the two factions reconciled as a unified Nacionalista party with an eight-point program.

=== National Socialist Party nomination ===
==== Candidates gallery ====
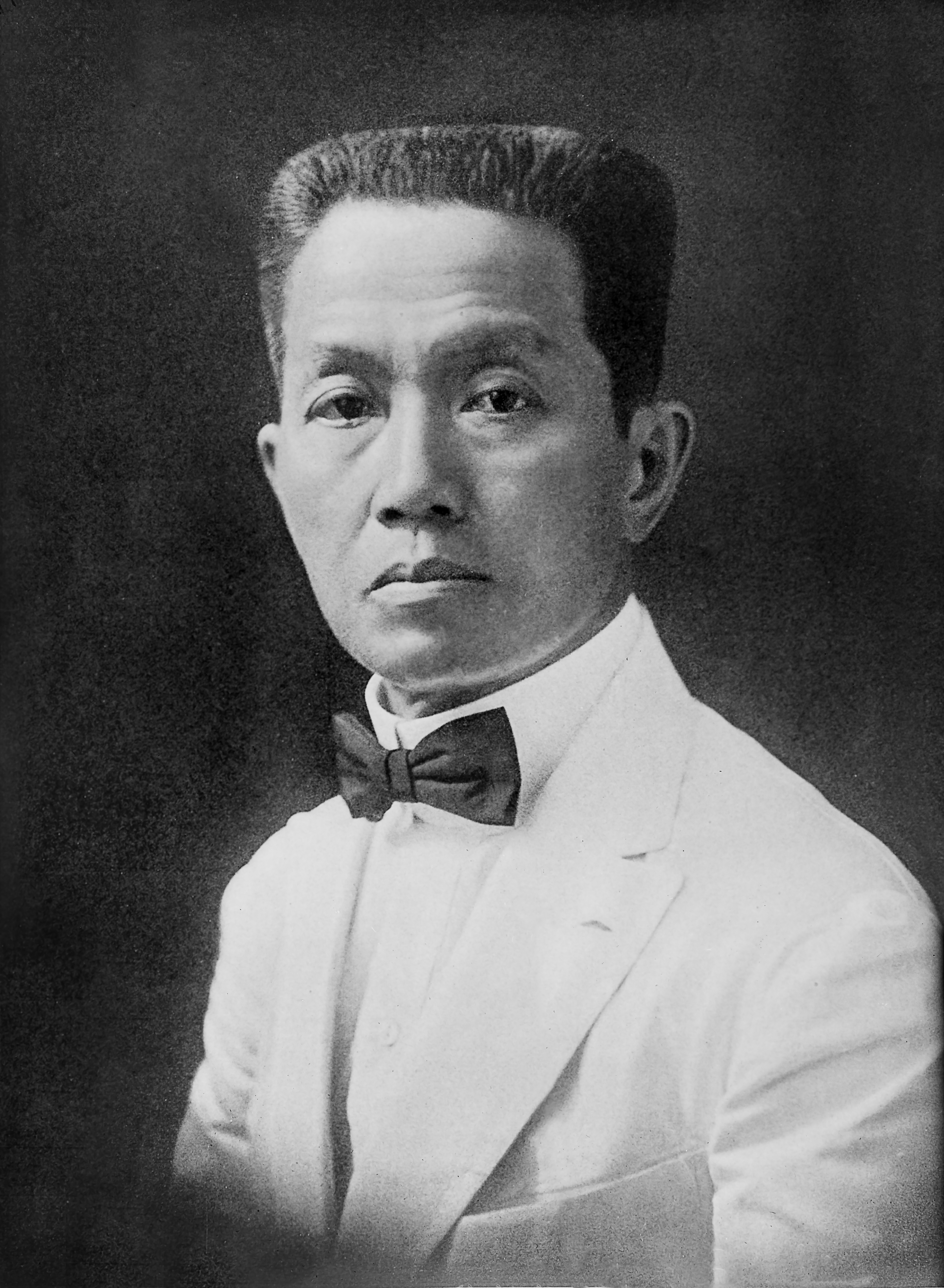
Former President Emilio Aguinaldo

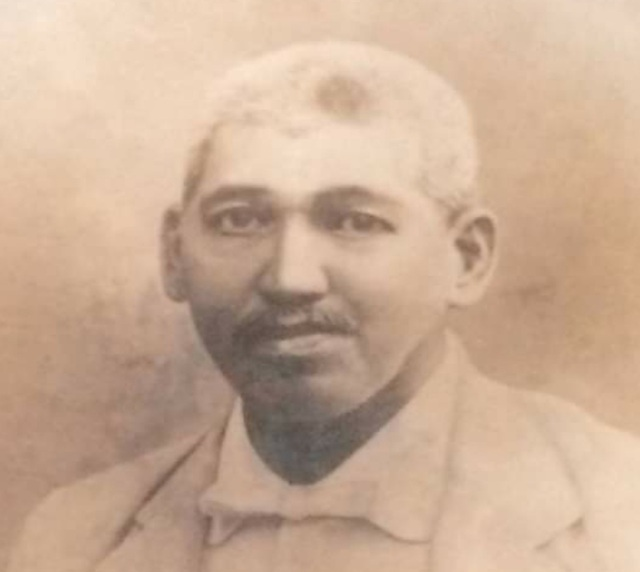
Former Governor of Iloilo Raymundo Melliza

Emilio Aguinaldo, who founded the National Socialist Party in 1934, announced his candidacy for president on June 2, 1935. Raymundo Melliza, former governor of Iloilo, was his running mate. Among those who supported his bid were Sixto Lopez, Anastacio Teodoro, judge Cayetano Lukban, Emiliano Tria Tirona, Narciso Lapuz, Vicente Sotto, and Miguel Cornejo. In Aguinaldo's acceptance speech at Cavite, Cavite, he addressed to an audience of around 5,000 his 44-point platform. His candidacy was also supported by the organization Veteranos de la Revolucion, formed during the administration of Governor-General Leonard Wood by remaining Filipino veterans of the Philippine Revolution and the Philippine–American War.

I do not have any political party behind me, my party is composed of the humble sons of the people, flattered before elections and forgotten after triumph. What more could I ask for?

– General Emilio Aguinaldo in his acceptance speech, June 1935.

Other parties that supported Aguinaldo's bid was the Partido Radical, a left-wing party formed in 1930 by Alfonso Mendoza, and Partido Filipinista, another party founded by Aguinaldo. Mendoza was then representative of Manila's second district.

=== Republican Party nomination ===
==== Candidates gallery ====
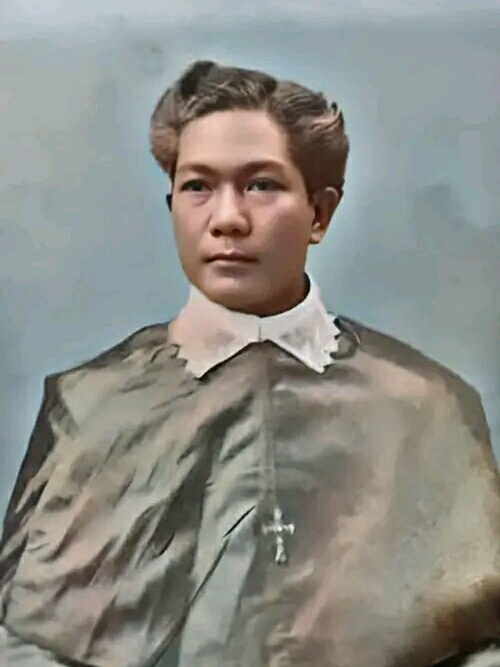
Supreme Bishop Gregorio Aglipay

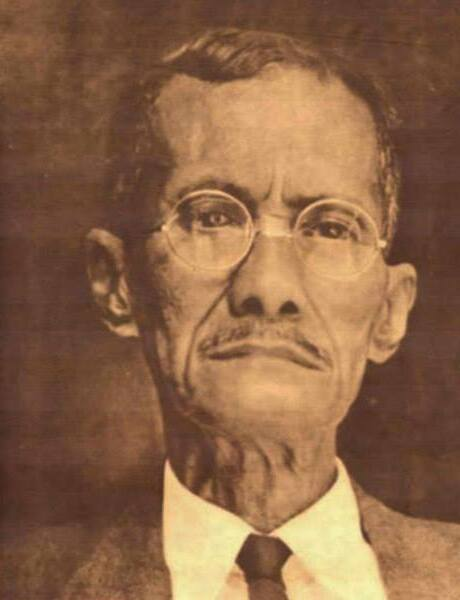
Manila Councilor Norberto Nabong

After his worldwide tour in 1934, wherein Aglipay went to Copenhagen to attend the 11th International Congress of Religious Liberals by the International Association for Religious Freedom (IARF), and even claimed to have interviewed Adolf Hitler and talked with Alejandro Lerroux, Prime Minister of Spain, and Edvard Beneš, President of Czechoslovakia, he expressed his intention to run as President of the Commonwealth. On June 19, 1935, Aglipay announced his candidacy, the last one to do so. Thus, Aglipay revived the Republican Party for this purpose, first organized in 1905 but collapsed after the 1907 elections. With this, he also launched his seven-point program.

I would consider myself unworthy of having been born a Filipino if my personal interests and the ties of friendship should prevent me from listening to the insistent popular clamor to vindicate with the powers of the highest office the constitutional liberties so arbitrarily trampled down by an abusive regime, and to cut the extravagant tentacles of the bureaucratic octopus that is sucking our public life.

– Bishop Gregorio Aglipay in his Manifesto of his candidacy, June 1935.

His bid was supported by the Partido Komunista ng Pilipinas (PKP), a left-wing party organized on November 7, 1930 by Crisanto Evangelista. The PKP fielded Norberto Nabong of Manila as Aglipay's running mate.

== Results ==
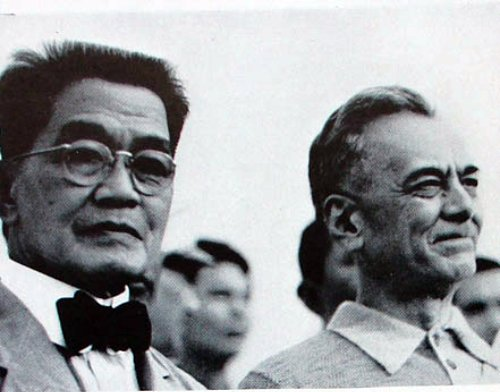
Aguinaldo (left) and Quezon (right)

Quezon carried all the provinces except Aguinaldo's home province of Cavite, Camarines Norte and Aglipay's home province of Ilocos Norte and Nueva Vizcaya. Aguinaldo showed strength in the Bicol provinces in the face of early results, but Quezon eventually triumphed in the region. Aglipay's strength in Nueva Vizcaya won the province for the Republican candidate, yet the Nacionalistas still prevailed from the rest of the provinces. Osmeña also carried all the provinces except Cavite, wherein Melliza won by a close margin. Osmeña's feat is unmatched to date.

While Aglipay quickly accepted the results, Aguinaldo protested about electoral manipulations. He raised the issue up to the United States, and his supporters in Cavite plotted not only a rally to disrupt the inauguration in November, but also launching an assassination attempt against the winners, yet to no avail.

Candidate	Party	Votes	%
Manuel L. Quezon	Nacionalista Party	695,332	67.98
Emilio Aguinaldo	National Socialist Party	179,349	17.53
Gregorio Aglipay	Republican Party	148,010	14.47
Pascual Racuyal	Independent	158	0.02
Total		1,022,849	100.00

Popular vote
Quezon	67.98%
Aguinaldo	17.53%
Aglipay	14.47%

=== Results per province ===
Province/City	Quezon		Aguinaldo		Aglipay		Racuyal	
Province/City	Votes	%	Votes	%	Votes	%	Votes	%
Abra	6,891	92.68	5	0.07	539	7.25	0	0.00
Agusan	4,242	79.99	244	4.60	814	15.35	3	0.06
Albay	23,535	74.99	7,817	24.91	33	0.11	0	0.00
Antique	6,123	50.00	3,178	25.95	2,934	23.96	11	0.09
Bataan	4,579	47.32	3,506	36.23	1,590	16.43	1	0.01
Batanes	773	79.20	198	20.29	4	0.41	1	0.10
Batangas	27,661	74.00	8,749	23.41	968	2.59	2	0.01
Bohol	20,374	76.67	5,500	20.70	694	2.61	6	0.02
Bukidnon	1,785	98.78	9	0.50	13	0.72	0	0.00
Bulacan	19,681	53.88	15,299	41.88	1,548	4.24	0	0.00
Cagayan	13,439	62.79	2,372	11.08	5,584	26.09	7	0.03
Camarines Norte	3,106	43.57	4,017	56.35	6	0.08	0	0.00
Camarines Sur	15,538	63.14	8,708	35.38	364	1.48	0	0.00
Capiz	18,632	91.36	1,508	7.39	253	1.24	0	0.00
Cavite	10,084	39.60	15,245	59.87	134	0.53	0	0.00
Cebu	45,441	86.21	6,876	13.05	369	0.70	23	0.04
Cotabato	2,307	89.35	55	2.13	218	8.44	2	0.08
Davao	9,200	89.16	588	5.70	527	5.11	4	0.04
Ilocos Norte	6,482	34.17	43	0.23	12,445	65.60	0	0.00
Ilocos Sur	14,749	64.96	212	0.93	7,744	34.11	0	0.00
Iloilo	33,274	64.20	13,427	25.91	5,121	9.88	5	0.01
Isabela	9,130	57.05	1,551	9.69	5,321	33.25	1	0.01
La Union	10,496	59.21	544	3.07	6,684	37.71	2	0.01
Laguna	18,655	72.28	3,384	13.11	3,766	14.59	4	0.02
Lanao	6,426	94.89	190	2.81	155	2.29	1	0.01
Leyte	43,929	89.45	4,187	8.53	994	2.02	2	0.00
Manila	25,281	63.23	10,188	25.48	4,507	11.27	5	0.01
Marinduque	6,021	84.06	1,062	14.83	78	1.09	2	0.03
Masbate	6,296	82.10	1,272	16.59	99	1.29	2	0.03
Mindoro	5,636	62.76	2,957	32.93	387	4.31	0	0.00
Misamis Occidental	6,590	72.21	1,375	15.07	1,160	12.71	1	0.01
Misamis Oriental	8,010	75.06	1,087	10.19	1,571	14.72	4	0.04
Mountain Province	5,084	79.38	119	1.86	1,200	18.74	2	0.03
Negros Occidental	36,851	71.42	3,527	6.84	11,206	21.72	12	0.02
Negros Oriental	15,526	88.30	1,108	6.30	949	5.40	0	0.00
Nueva Ecija	15,066	44.10	9,032	26.44	10,066	29.46	2	0.01
Nueva Vizcaya	2,039	32.86	164	2.64	4,002	64.49	1	0.02
Palawan	4,525	88.24	577	11.25	26	0.51	0	0.00
Pampanga	21,903	65.11	7,958	23.66	3,777	11.23	1	0.00
Pangasinan	34,425	51.09	1,851	2.75	31,103	46.16	2	0.00
Rizal	23,107	62.57	8,921	24.16	4,888	13.24	11	0.03
Romblon	3,471	73.06	1,246	26.23	32	0.67	2	0.04
Samar	22,920	80.22	4,984	17.44	660	2.31	8	0.03
Sorsogon	12,014	61.84	7,403	38.11	4	0.02	5	0.03
Sulu	1,414	93.52	60	3.97	38	2.51	0	0.00
Surigao	8,879	80.35	497	4.50	1,668	15.10	6	0.05
Tarlac	10,785	55.82	1,082	5.60	7,453	38.57	1	0.01
Tayabas	25,078	86.22	3,126	10.75	870	2.99	12	0.04
Zambales	6,504	60.91	1,069	10.01	3,105	29.08	0	0.00
Zamboanga	10,147	86.40	1,313	11.18	280	2.38	4	0.03
Total	694,104	67.94	179,390	17.56	147,951	14.48	158	0.02
Source: Department of Agriculture and Commerce

=== Manila vote ===
Manila, as showed in the June 1934 election, leaned to vote for the opposition. First District voted for Gregorio Perfecto, a Democrata, as representative. Second District voted Alfonso Mendoza, a Radical. However, an opposition bailiwick the city could have been, the Nacionalista party won overwhelmingly, whereas it was expected that Aguinaldo and Aglipay will make an upset advantage.

Candidate	Votes	Percent
Quezon	25,454	63.33%
Aguinaldo	10,236	25.47%
Aglipay	4,503	11.20%

== In popular culture ==
- Quezon, 2025 film about Manuel L. Quezon, culminating in the 1935 election.

== See also ==
- 1935 Philippine legislative election
- Commission on Elections
- Politics of the Philippines
- Elections in the Philippines
