= National Socialist Party (Philippines) =

Filipino political party

National Socialist Party Partido Pambansang Sosyalista
- Leader: Emilio Aguinaldo
- Founder: Jose Timog; Alfonso Mendoza; Pablo Manlapit; Pedro Abad Santos; Miguel Cornejo
- Founded: June 25, 1935
- Dissolved: 1936
- Merger of: Sakdalistas; Radical Party; Laborista Party; Partido Komunista; Fascist Party; Civil Union
- Ideology: Filipino nationalism Populism; Anti-imperialism; Anti-Americanism; Agrarian socialism
- Political position: Left-wing to right-wing

The National Socialist Party was a political party in the Philippines. It served as the political vehicle of Emilio Aguinaldo, president of the First Philippine Republic in the 1935 Philippine presidential election.

The party was founded on June 25, 1935, by the Sakdalistas led by Jose Timog, the Radical Party of Alfonso Mendoza, Laborista Party of Pablo Manlapit, Pampanga communists by Pedro Abad Santos, Miguel Cornejo's Philippine fascists, and Vicente Sotto's Civil Union. In Cebu, the branch of the party was founded on July 7, with the branch putting up four candidates in the seven congressional districts of Cebu.

Aguinaldo announced his candidacy in Cavite. He picked former governor of Iloilo Raymundo Melliza as his running mate. In his speech, Aguinaldo claimed that he did not have "any political party behind [him]," and that his party was "composed of the humble sons of the people".

In the ensuing campaign, the Nacionalista Party, then the largest party, ignored the National Socialists. It was not until when Aguinaldo organized a nationwide campaign network with the Veterans of the Philippine Revolution did the Nacionalistas take Aguinaldo seriously. Manuel L. Quezon, then-Senate president, and frontrunner, brought up the unexplained deaths of Andres Bonifacio and Antonio Luna and blamed Aguinaldo for it. Quezon resoundingly defeated both Aguinaldo and Gregorio Aglipay of the Republican Party to become the first president of the Commonwealth of the Philippines.

After the election, Aguinaldo protested his loss, accusing Governor-General Frank Murphy of partiality during the election. He later presented Murphy with a report of alleged electoral frauds. Murphy referred Aguinaldo's charges to the Philippine Legislature, and instructed Secretary of Justice Jose Yulo to investigate the matter.

== Electoral performance ==
=== Presidential elections ===
Year	Candidate	Votes	%	Result	Outcome
1935	Emilio Aguinaldo	179,349	17.54	Lost	Manuel L. Quezon won

=== Vice Presidential elections ===
Year	Candidate	Votes	%	Result	Outcome
1935	Raymundo Melliza	70,899	7.59	Lost	Sergio Osmeña won
