= Masashi =

- Gender: Male

Origin
- Origin: Japanese
- Meaning: Different meanings depending on the kanji used

Masashi is a masculine Japanese given name. Notable people with the name include:

- Masashi Abe (阿部 雅司; born 1965), Japanese skier
- Masashi Adachi (阿達 雅志; born 1959), Japanese politician
- Masashi Amenomori (雨森 雅司; 1930–1984), Japanese actor
- Masashi Ando (安藤 雅司; born 1969), Japanese animator and character designer
- Masashi Aoyagi (青柳 政司; 1956–2022), Japanese professional wrestler and karateka
- Masashi Arikura (有倉 雅史; born 1967), Japanese baseball player
- Masashi Asaki (朝基 まさし; born 1970), Japanese manga artist
- Masashi Chikazawa (近澤 昌志; born 1982), Japanese basketball player
- Masashi Daidōji (大道寺 将司; 1948-2017), Japanese communist activist
- Masashi Date (伊達 昌司; born 1975), Japanese baseball player
- Masashi Ebara (江原 正士; born 1953), Japanese voice actor
- Masashi Ebinuma (海老沼 匡; born 1990), Japanese judoka
- Masashi Endō (遠藤 雅; born 1974), Japanese actor
- Masashi Eriguchi (江里口 匡史; born 1988), Japanese sprinter
- Masashi Fujimoto (藤本 政志; born 1963), Japanese entertainer who lives in London
- Masashi Fujiwara (藤原 正司; 1946–2018), Japanese politician
- Masashi Furukawa (古川 雅司; 1935–2026), Japanese politician
- Masashi Goda (合田 雅吏; born 1969), Japanese actor
- Masashi Gotō (後藤 政志; born 1949), Japanese nuclear engineer, author, activist and commentator
- Masashi Hamauzu (浜渦 正志; born 1971), Japanese composer
- Masashi Hirose (広瀬 正志; born 1947), Japanese voice actor
- Masashi Hosoya (細谷 将司; born 1989), Japanese basketball player
- Masashi Ishibashi (actor) (石橋 雅史; 1933–2018), Japanese karateka and actor
- Masashi Ishibashi (politician) (石橋 政嗣; 1924–2019), Japanese politician
- Masashi Itō (伊藤 正; 1921–2004), Japanese holdout
- Masashi Ito (baseball) (伊藤 将司; born 1996), Japanese professional baseball pitcher
- Masashi Joho (城宝 匡史; born 1982), Japanese basketball player
- Masashi Kameda (亀田 正志; born 1975), Japanese mixed martial artist
- Masashi Kamekawa (亀川 諒史; born 1993), Japanese footballer
- Masashi Kato (加藤 [Katō] 真志; born 1970), Japanese freestyle swimmer
- Masashi Kawakami (川上 雅史; born 1972), Japanese boxer
- Masashi Kishimoto (岸本 斉史; born 1974), Japanese manga artist
- Masashi Kita (北 正志), Japanese mixed martial artist
- Masashi Kitamura (北村 允志; born 1977), Japanese voice actor
- Masashi Kokubun (國分 将; born 1995), Japanese footballer
- Masashi Kudō (animator) (工藤 昌史), Japanese animator
- Masashi Kudo (boxer) (工藤 政志; born 1951), Japanese boxer
- Masashi Kumura (玖村 将史; born 1999), Japanese kickboxer
- Masashi Kuriyama (栗山 雅史; born 1988), Japanese volleyball player
- Masashi Mikami (三上 真史; born 1983), Japanese actor
- Masashi Mito (水戸 将史; born 1962), Japanese politician
- Masashi Miyazawa (宮沢 正史; born 1978), Japanese footballer
- Masashi Motoyama (本山 雅志; born 1979), Japanese footballer
- Masashi Nagara (長良 将司; born 1977), Japanese fencer
- Masashi Nakano (中野 正志; born 1948), Japanese politician
- Masashi Nakashima (中島 勝司; born 1962), Japanese diver
- Masashi Nakayama (中山 雅史; born 1967), Japanese footballer
- Masashi Nishimori (西森 将司; born 1989), Japanese baseball player
- Masashi Nishiyama (西山 将士; born 1985), Japanese judoka
- Masashi Oguro (大黒[Ōguro] 将志; born 1980), Japanese footballer
- Masashi Oiso (大礒[Ōiso] 正嗣), Japanese Magic: The Gathering player
- Masashi Omiya (大宮 政志; born 1938), Japanese cyclist
- Masashi Onda (恩田 昌史; born 1939), Japanese field hockey player
- Masashi Otani (大谷 昌司; born 1983), Japanese footballer
- Masashi Otsubo (大坪 政士; born 1938), Japanese pole vaulter
- Masashi Owada (大和田 真史; born 1981), Japanese footballer
- Masashi Ozaki (尾崎 将司; 1947–2025), Japanese golfer
- Masashi Ozawa (小沢 正志; 1947–2023), Japanese professional wrestler
- Masashi Sada (さだ まさし, 佐田 雅志; born 1952), Japanese singer
- Masashi Sato (佐藤 主迪; born 1994), Japanese politician
- Masashi Shiga (志賀 政司; born 1939), Japanese basketball player
- Masashi Shimada (born 1971), Japanese golfer
- Masashi Shimada (comedian) (島田 まさし; born 1966), Japanese comedian
- Masashi Shimamura (島村 征志; born 1971), Japanese footballer
- Masashi Sugawara (菅原 正志; born 1962), Japanese voice actor
- Masashi Takeda (wrestler) (竹田 誠志; born 1985), Japanese professional wrestler
- Masashi Tanaka (田中 政志; born 1962), Japanese manga artist
- Masashi Tashiro (田代 まさし, 田代 政; born 1956), Japanese television performer
- Masashi Tazawa (田沢 仁; born 1930), Japanese botanist
- Masashi Ueda (植田 まさし; born 1947), Japanese manga artist
- Masashi Ueda (上田 仁; 1904–1966), Japanese conductor, pianist and bassoonist
- Masashi Ueda (conductor) (上田 仁; 1904–1966), Japanese conductor, bassoonist
- Masashi Usami, Japanese scientist
- Masashi Wada (和田 昌士; born 1997), Japanese footballer
- Masashi Wakasa (若狭 大志; born 1989), Japanese footballer
- Masashi Waki (脇 雅史; born 1945), Japanese politician
- Masashi Watanabe (渡辺 正; 1936–1995), Japanese footballer and manager
- Masashi Yamamoto (山本 政志; born 1956), Japanese film director
- Masashi Yamamoto (baseball) (山本 雅士; born 1994), Japanese baseball player
- Masashi Yanagisawa (柳沢 正史; born 1960), Japanese-American molecular biologist and physician
- Masashi Yokoi (横井 昌志; born 1982), Japanese professional drifter
