= Taiwanese Imperial Japan Serviceman =

Overview of Taiwanese nationals who served in the Imperial Japanese Army and Navy

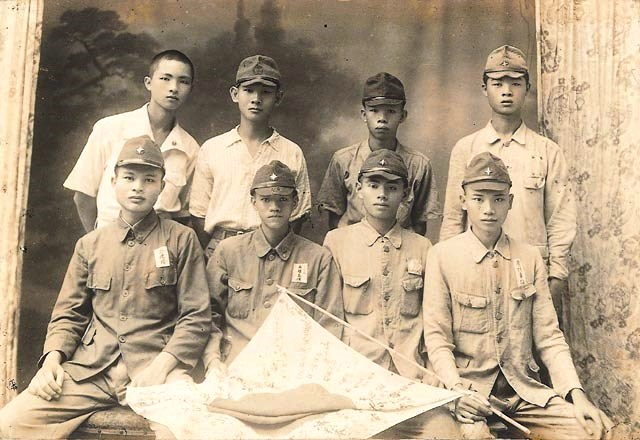
Taiwanese servicemen in the Imperial Japanese Army

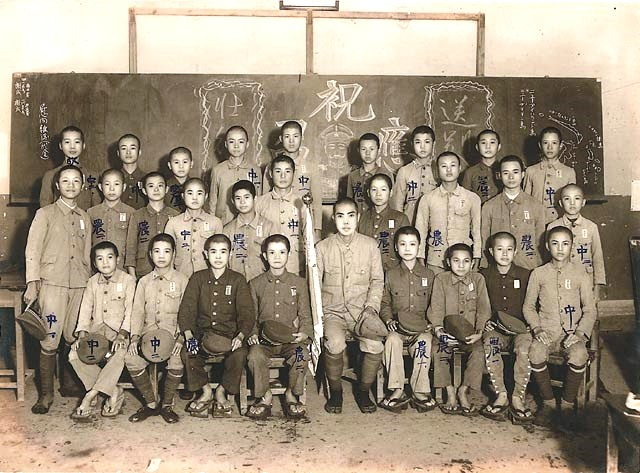
Taiwanese student draftees at a farewell party

A Taiwanese Imperial Japan Serviceman (Chinese: 台籍日本兵; Japanese: 台湾人日本兵) is any Taiwanese Chinese person (aboriginal volunteers are distinguished from them) who served in the Imperial Japanese Army or Navy during World War II whether as a soldier, a sailor, or in another non-combat capacity. According to statistics provided by Japan's Ministry of Health, Labour and Welfare, during the Second Sino-Japanese War and the subsequent World War II, a total of 207,183 Taiwanese served in the military of Imperial Japan and 30,304 of them were declared killed or missing in action. Most Taiwanese servicemen up to 1944 were in non-combatant roles and deployed in Southeast Asia with a small number being stationed in China. Taiwanese servicemen were abandoned by Japan at the end of the war and neither orders or transportation were provided for them by Japan, owing to logistic deficiencies, or the United States. Most of them returned to Taiwan but a large number also ended up in mainland China. Ex-servicemen failed to obtain restitution for unpaid wages from Japan in the following decades.

== History ==
Starting in July 1937, Taiwanese began to play a role on the battlefield, initially as civilian interpreters, transporters, laborers, and other noncombatant positions. Prior to this, the Taiwanese were banned from serving in the Japanese military. Taiwanese people were not recruited for combat until late in the war due to Japanese suspicions of Taiwanese loyalty. However, some Taiwanese were utilized as translators for operations in China and parts of Southeast Asia with significant overseas Chinese populations, such as in Malaya and Singapore. Some became complicit in war crimes, specifically during the Sook Ching massacre where they participated in the killings or served as undercover agents to infiltrate local Chinese companies. After the United States entered the war in 1942, the Special Volunteer System was implemented for recruitment of Taiwanese soldiers, allowing even aborigines to be recruited as part of the Takasago Volunteer Army. The Imperial Navy Special Volunteer System was implemented in July 1943 and military conscription in 1945. From 1937 to 1945, over 207,000 Taiwanese were employed by the Japanese military: 126,000 civilian employees and 80,000 servicemen. Among them, 33,000 were sent to China (mostly Hainan Island) and 61,000 to the Philippines. Roughly 50,000 went missing in action or died as war casualties, another 2,000 were disabled, 21 were executed for war crimes, and 147 were sentenced to imprisonment for two or three years. Survivors faced difficulties in both China and Taiwan after the war. The western Allies convicted 173 Taiwanese as war criminals. The Taiwanese soldiers were convicted at disproportionately high rates because they were assigned to guard POW camps and the allied soldiers they were in contact with remembered them after the war.

Some Taiwanese ex-Japanese soldiers claim they were coerced and did not choose to join the army. Wang Qinghuai was a farmer at the time of the war and said there was no way to refuse recruitment. Teng Sheng, who was 22 years old when he was mobilized in 1943, said he could not refuse even though he did not want to go because his entire education and training had taught him his body was meant to serve the country and emperor. Others, such as Xie Yong, were in vocational school at the time and their Japanese military instructor told them that the "nation and emperor needed us." They went through a short period of training and became military aviation machinists. Lin Xinglin was recruited into the army while living in Japan but was given a civilian position later once they found out he was not Japanese. Some were incentivized by the attractive salary, which was double what they could earn in Taiwan. Some joined out of patriotism to Japan and felt that working in the military was an honor. One Liu Chengqing who enrolled in 1944 as a civilian employee said in an August 1995 interview that he felt empowered by the "Yamato Spirit."

Most Taiwanese experienced a short service period due to their late recruitment in the war. Many were assigned to civilian positions rather than combat positions. Racial discrimination from Japanese soldiers towards the Taiwanese was commonplace but there were also rare occasions of camaraderie. Lu Qinglin joined the Japanese Navy in May 1945 but was demoted to a civilian employee once they found out he was Taiwanese. He then became a clerk because Taiwanese could not work in a lab. However Lu befriended a Major Suzuki who treated him like a foster son. Some faced moments of greater equality during their time in the military. Chen Chunqing stated that "Facing the bullets of the enemy, you and the Japanese are equal." He was motivated by his desire to fight the British and Americans but was sent to China after a month of training. There he became disillusioned and tried to leave to join other Taiwanese who had defected to the Chinese side, although his effort was fruitless. Chen Genfa was called "chankoro" (Qing slave) by a Japanese soldier, who was then beaten up by Japanese MPs once Chen said he was ready to die for the nation and emperor. Some of the Taiwanese ex-Japanese soldiers had ambivalent feelings upon Japan's defeat and could not imagine what liberation from Japan and what Taiwan's handover to China would look like. One Zhou Yichun recalled surrender leaflets dropped by U.S. planes stating that Taiwan would return to China and Korea was going to be independent. He said, "I had striven hard to be a loyal subject of the emperor, and today I discovered something that I remembered my grandfather telling me—that I was a Chinese."

== Post-war ==
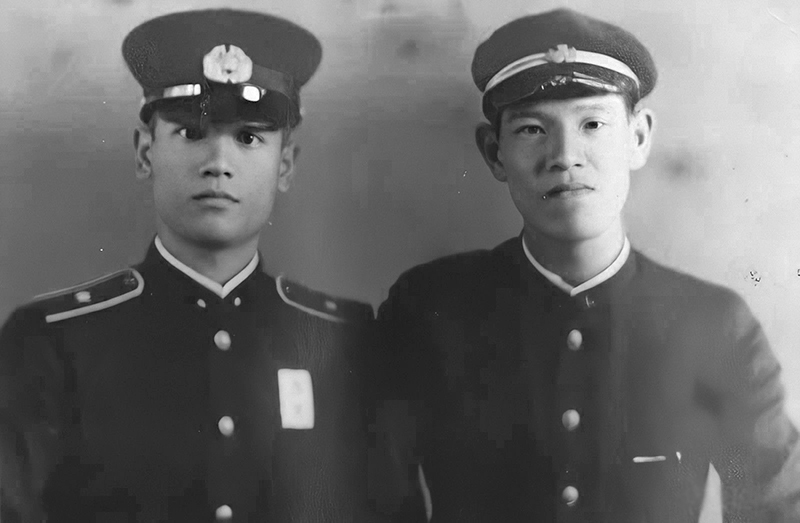
Lee Teng-hui, right, with his brother, Lee Teng-chin, who is seen here in police officer uniform.

According to Chen Junqing, who was acting supervisor of the Association of Taiwanese Ex-Japanese Soldiers, Taiwanese soldiers and civilian employees were simply abandoned by Japan after the war. No transportation was provided back to either Japan or Taiwan. No orders were given and they were left to their own devices from China to the Pacific. They had to fight for their own survival after the Japanese were sent back home on American warships. Most returned to Taiwan but a considerable number also ended up in mainland China. Lu Qinglin was captured by the Soviets and sent to Siberia before he was repatriated to Japan in 1949. He had difficulty finding work because the Japanese believed he was a "Red". Lu refused to return to Taiwan because of the ongoing anti-communist purge and left for mainland China in 1952.

When asked the reason for serving, many veterans stated that they joined for better treatment for them and for their families. According to interviewed veterans, those who served were given extra food and other rationed articles for their families, and were less likely to be discriminated against by the Japanese government. Another reason, as stated by some veterans, was that they were treated more equally with the Japanese in the military because they "were all soldiers for the Emperor." After Japan's defeat and handover of Taiwan, many veterans who survived the war were persecuted by the Kuomintang (Nationalist) government because the Nationalists saw them as Hanjian (race traitors) for serving in the Japanese military. Some veterans later joined the communist-led 27 Brigade during the February 28 uprising against the Nationalist government that resulted in further oppression during the White Terror. A few veterans dressed up in Japanese Army garb, chanting Japanese military songs as they marched on the streets, beating up mainlanders they came across. Many of the veterans did not identify as either Chinese or Taiwanese after the war, but as "pious sons of the Emperor Hirohito."

In 1972, a group of Taiwanese ex-Japanese soldiers in Taiwan failed to have their organization registered for claiming reparations from Japan. The Association of Taiwanese Ex-Japanese Soldiers was officially registered in 1993. In 1982, the Japanese government refused to pay the Taiwanese soldiers compensation because they were not Japanese citizens. Only after a petition in 1987 was a decision made to offer 2 million yen to former Taiwanese soldiers who had suffered severe injury in battle and to the families of those who died. The 2 million yen per claim, a minute fraction of that paid to Japanese soldiers, amounted to very little of the unpaid military salary as a result of inflation according to the organization's calculations. The Japanese government refused to take into account the calculations and refused to pay the wartime debts. Nor did they offer an annual allowance like that paid to Japanese soldiers. According to one Taiwanese ex-Japanese soldier, Chen Junqing, he was very shocked by his trip to Japan in 1973. He had believed he would be warmly welcomed as a soldier who fought for the emperor. "That was why I was so shocked to see all the Japanese people turn their backs on us even though we had served as Japanese soldiers, had fought for the Japanese, were killed and disabled for the Japanese people, and had lent our money to the Japanese government in the form of military postal savings," said Chen Genfa. Another Taiwanese ex-Japanese soldier, Teng Sheng, said that "We fought bravely under the Japanese flag alongside the Japanese... If the Japanese government doesn’t compensate us, then the trust and righteousness that Japanese teachers taught us is meaningless." Teng had difficulty obtaining his injury record from the Japanese and even afterward he was still refused compensation for his injuries.

We pleaded for reparations identical to those the Japanese ex-servicemen enjoyed, because some of us really thought that we had been the Japanese emperor's pious sons rather than Chinese. But almost all Japanese friends frowned at our request. They said we had lost our Japanese nationality at least as early as the signing of the peace treaty between Japan and Taiwan in 1952.

— Chen Junqing, a Taiwanese ex-Japanese soldier

Former President Lee Teng-hui of the Republic of China briefly served as a second lieutenant in the Imperial Japanese Army in the final months of World War II. His brother, Lee Teng-chin, was killed in action in the Philippines while serving in the Imperial Japanese Navy during the Battle of Manila and his remains were never recovered. Lee Teng-chin and over 27,000 Taiwanese, who were killed or presumed killed in action, were enshrined in the Yasukuni Shrine in Tokyo, Japan. In 2005, a group of 60 Taiwanese aborigines protested at the Yasukuni Shrine and requested the removal of their ancestors' names from the shrine.

== See also ==
- Teruo Nakamura, Amis: Attun Palalin, Chinese: Lee Kuang-hui – the last confirmed Japanese holdout soldier, found in 1974 in Indonesia.
- Hebei-Chahar Political Council
- Autonomous Government of Eastern Hebei
- Manchukuo Imperial Army
- Collaborationist Chinese Army
- Kuomintang-Nanjing
