= List of Nippon Professional Baseball players (C) =

The following is a list of Nippon Professional Baseball players with the last name starting with C, retired or active.

== C ==
- Alex Cabrera
- Jolbert Cabrera
- Mike Campbell
- Ozzie Canseco
- Esmailin Caridad
- Dan Carlson
- Buddy Carlyle
- Giovanni Carrara
- D. J. Carrasco
- Héctor Carrasco
- Mark Carreon
- Lance Carter
- Carlos Castillo
- Wes Chamberlain
- Chih-Chia Chang
- Robinson Checo
- Wei-Yin Chen
- Wen-bin Chen
- Chien-ming Chiang
- Scott Chiasson
- Hideki Chiba
- Isao Chiba
- Shigeru Chiba
- Atsuhiro Chihara
- Masashi Chikazawa
- Shyoshi Chiyomaru
- Sung-min Cho
- Minchol Chon
- Min-Tae Chung
- Archi Cianfrocco
- Phil Clark
- Darnell Coles
- Terry Collins
- Scott Coolbaugh
- Scott Cooper
- Bryan Corey
- Steve Cox
- Joe Crawford
- Doug Creek
- Felipe Crespo
- Warren Cromartie
- D. T. Cromer
- Iván Cruz
- Rafael Cruz
- Darwin Cubillán
- Chris Cumberland
