= Atashin'chi =

Japanese manga and anime series

- Cover of Atashin'chi volume 1 as published by Media Factory, featuring Mother.

あたしンち
- Genre: Comedy; Slice of Life
- Manga
- Written by: Eiko Kera
- Published by: Media Factory; Asahi Shimbun Publications
- Magazine: Yomiuri Shimbun
- Original run: June 5, 1994 – March 2012
- Volumes: 21
- Manga

Atashin'chi SUPER
- Written by: Eiko Kera
- Published by: Asahi Shimbun Publications
- Magazine: Aera
- Original run: December 23, 2019 – present
- Volumes: 3
- Anime television series
- Directed by: Akitaro Daichi (#1–4); Tetsuo Yasumi (#9–330)
- Music by: Motoi Sakuraba
- Studio: Shin-Ei Animation
- Original network: ANN (TV Asahi) (#1–111); TV Asahi, YTS, ABC, ncc, yab, EAT (#112–330)
- English network: IN: Nickelodeon
- Original run: April 19, 2002 – September 19, 2009
- Episodes: 330 (663 segments)
- Anime film
- Directed by: Tetsuo Yasumi
- Produced by: Sojiro Masuko; Naomi Nishiguchi; Sachio Saito
- Written by: Kazuyuki Morosawa; Natsuko Takahashi
- Music by: Masae Sagara
- Studio: Shin-Ei Animation
- Released: December 6, 2003
- Runtime: 95 minutes
- Anime film

Atashin'chi 3D
- Directed by: Wataru Takahashi
- Written by: Hiroshi Ōnogi
- Music by: Masae Sagara
- Studio: Shin-Ei Animation
- Released: November 13, 2010
- Runtime: 40 minutes
- Anime television series

Shin Atashin'chi
- Directed by: Hirofumi Ogura
- Written by: Shinji Ueda
- Music by: Akifumi Tada
- Studio: Shin-Ei Animation
- Original network: Animax
- Original run: October 6, 2015 – April 5, 2016
- Episodes: 26 (77 segments)
- Original net animation

Atashin'chi NEXT
- Directed by: Tetsuo Yasumi; Kazumi Nonaka
- Written by: Shinji Ueda
- Music by: Motoi Sakuraba
- Studio: Shin-Ei Animation
- Released: June 5, 2024 – present
- Episodes: 12
- icon

Atashin'chi (Japanese: あたしンち, Hepburn: Atashinchi; short for "atashi no uchi", literally my home or my family, in feminine and spoken form) is a Japanese comedy manga series by Eiko Kera. It was originally serialized in the Sunday edition of the Yomiuri Shimbun newspaper from 1994 to 2012, while a revival, titled Atashin'chi SUPER, has been serialised in Aera magazine since December 2019. The manga centers around the daily life of the Tachibana family.

An anime adaptation by Shin-Ei Animation was broadcast on TV Asahi from April 19, 2002, to September 19, 2009. A second anime series, titled Shin Atashin'chi (新あたしンち; "New Atashin'chi") was broadcast on Animax from October 6, 2015, to April 5, 2016, in Japan, and was simulcast on Crunchyroll in certain countries. Select episodes of Atashin'chi and Shin Atashin'chi are available on the official YouTube channel with English subtitles. A third anime series, Atashin'chi Next has been running since June 5, 2024.

== Overview ==
The story revolves around the Tachibana family, which consists of the frugal and sometimes unintentionally careless mother, the taciturn father who goes at his own pace, the high school girl Mikan, who is plain, timid and a bit clumsy, and the younger brother Yuzuhiko (nicknamed Yuzupi or Yu-chan), a middle school student who is shy and unfamiliar with things like love, but is sensitive, logical, and has a steady personality. The brother and sister's names are based on the Citrus unshiu (mikan) and yuzu fruits. Many other characters who intersect the Tachibana's lives are depicted interacting with the family as well. When the series first began, the story was centered around the family, with Mikan and her mother at the center (the name, Atashin'chi, is written in such a way that is implied to be from Mikan's or her mother's perspective). However, as the series continued, episodes that weave together the relationships between each family member began to be depicted.

The stage of the story in the anime work is Tanashi, Nishitokyo, and the family lives in a three bedroom apartment on the fifth floor. Starting with Tanashi Station, which is the nearest station, Seibu Shinjuku Line, Seibu Bus, Kanto Bus, Hana Bus, a community bus in Nishi-Tokyo City, etc. are faithfully reproduced in the work (the 1994 time when it was written at the beginning is still Tanashi Station was the old station building).

== Characters ==
=== The Tachibana family ===
The family name, in earlier manga printings and in early TV episodes, was spelled using kanji as 立花. However, when the series reached international acclaim, especially in China, the spelling changed to katakana as タチバナ.

- Father (父)
  - voiced by: Kenichi Ogata; Fujiko Takimoto (child, 1st season)
  - A salaryman who works in Downtown Tokyo. He is the characteristic middle-aged Japanese working man who is a heavy beer drinker, smokes often, and frequents the pachinko parlors and loves baseball. However, he finds the time to be there for his family, and is often helpful on his Sundays off. He drives a blue hatchback coupe, but commutes to work by commuter train.
- Mother (母)
  - voiced by: Kumiko Watanabe
  - A modern-day Japanese housewife, who arrogantly prides herself on a clean home, a balanced budget, and a frugal yet "tasty" dinner. Although at times she finds nifty tricks to multitask and consolidate household chores (like vacuuming the rug and waxing the wooden floor all at once), she is awfully clumsy and gets herself into sticky situations from losing control. Despite her hard work, she is also known for being somewhat lazy by taking copious afternoon naps, watching TV while eating senbei and skipping out on shopping and cooking on rainy days.
- Mikan (立花 みかん, Mikan Tachibana)
  - voiced by: Fumiko Orikasa
  - A 17-year-old second-year high school student, and is the intended "main protagonist" of the series. (The "atashi" (me) in the title.) She goes to a public high school, which is a long, stressful commute away. It also doesn't require school uniforms. She is portrayed as an easy-going, relaxed girl who likes to have fun. Often very maiden-like, but other times very tomboyish, she goes through every day with something funny happening. Her western name is Megan Tahoma, Megan Hilda Tahoma.
- Yuzuhiko (立花 ユズヒコ, Yuzuhiko Tachibana)
  - voiced by: Daisuke Sakaguchi; Yuka Inokuchi (infants); Mariya Ise (child, 2nd season)
  - A second-year junior high school student who is very studious and forward-thinking. He is innovative and his brain far exceeds his age. He tends to find solutions to the family's common mishaps. His western name is Yuzan Harold Tahoma.

== Supporting characters ==
=== People related to Mikan ===
==== Mikan's closest friends ====
- Shimi-chan (しみちゃん)
  - voiced by: Kaori Matoi (1st season); Yuko Iida (2nd season)

Mikan's classmate. Her last name is Shimizu (清水, Shimizu), which leads to her common nickname "Shimi-chan". She is Mikan's high school friend who attended a different junior high school, but she is a close friend of Mikan. She is mature, has a good style, and respects Mikan no matter what. She enjoys reading palms, tarot card readings and spirituality. She often goes to different fortune tellers/card readers for fun but also to learn from them. Whenever she gives any advice or her thoughts on any matter to Mikan, she pretends to smoke a nonexistent cigarette, to which Mikan then gives her a nonexistent Ashtray. Shimi-chan prefers the innocent side of Mikan, deeming it as cute and childlike. As of now, Shimi-chan is the only character who knows Mikan has a crush on Iwaki-kun. Originally, Shimi-chan thought Mikan had a crush on Yoshioka, which led to a confrontation that resulted in Mikan telling Shimi-chan her feelings for Iwaki-kun.

- Yoshioka (吉岡)
  - voiced by: Yūsuke Numata

Mikan's classmate from the same junior high school (Minami Junior High School). He has a slightly awkward and romantic personality. He and Mikan have been friends since junior high school, but have no romantic feelings for one another. Iwaki-kun and Yoshioka get along well together and talk about their similar interests. Sometimes Yoshioka likes to tease Mikan by making fun of her as a joke. In Shin Atashin'chi it was revealed that Yoshioka has a phobia of fish, more specifically a phobia of fishes' faces. Yoshioka finds it pleasing to correct Mikan's statements and finds the fact that Mikan doesn't know many trivial or philosophical facts unpleasing. So much so, that he just barges into Mikan's conversations just so that he can correct her and show his intelligence, which leads to Mikan being annoyed.

- Yukarin (ゆかりん)
  - voiced by: Haruna Ikezawa

Mikan's classmate whose real name is Yuka (from anime 1st season). She is usually quiet, but when she smiles and she hugs her belly without worrying about others. She has white skin and is envied by Mikan due to her maiden-like personality. She, Mikan, and Shimi-chan are often seen together in a trio.

- Iwaki (岩木)
  - voiced by: Hikaru Midorikawa; Makoto Tsumura (child)

Mikan's classmate, often nicknamed with a "-kun" at the end is a tall humble boy with a warm, big-hearted personality who doesn't use many words when he speaks. He is on good terms with Yoshioka. Once on his way home, he picked up a ballpoint pen that Mikan dropped on the bus, which caused Mikan to develop feelings for him. Since then, Mikan has fallen in love with him so much that she can't even stand in front of him, but Iwaki himself doesn't realize her feelings for him.

- Fubuki Haruyama (春山ふぶき, Haruyama Fubuki)
  - voiced by: Rie Tanaka

Mikan's classmate. She has a sweet-hearted personality and is clumsy and forgetful at times. She is tall and gentle on the outside, a young maiden like beautiful girl. Lots of boys in Mikan's high school have fallen for her and would go to extreme lengths just to make her notice them. She doesn't realise why the boys are so kind to her and doesn't take their actions for granted. Despite being the most beautiful girl in school, she isn't all that intelligent and shows that by asking weird and self-explanatory questions to Mikan and Shimi-chan.

==== Bear Brigade Club ====
- Rio (理央)
  - voiced by: Makiko Ohmoto

A member of Teddy Bear Brigade Club. She is a rich daughter who lives in a mansion, but she does not put it on her nose, and she is rather disgusting in the upper class life, and she wants to live in a downtown area. She has teddy bears in her room, just like Mikan. She has a stylish mother wearing makeup in the house, and her uncle who manages a dandy father and villa.

- Asada (浅田)
  - voiced by: Harumi Asai

A member of Teddy Bear Brigade Club. She is chubby and small eyes. She is gluttonous and greasy, and brought a voluminous hamburger and fried chicken during the break of the school festival.

- Kajii (梶井)
  - voiced by:Yuki Kajita

A member of Teddy Bear Brigade Club, she is on good terms with Asada, and they often act in pairs, such as chatting with each other. She always performing a duet with Mikan and shows off her harmonious singing voice. She basically agrees with everyone's opinion and goes out of control.

- Niita (新田)
  - voiced by: Chiaki Morita

A junior (first year high school student) who joined the club when Mikan and the others were in their second year of high school. She speaks with "ssu" at the end of her words. She looks chubby and has a shaved head with round glasses. At the teddy bear exhibition, she performed a breakdance while wearing a bear costume to attract customers, and the exhibition ended on a high note. She is the only one in Teddy Bear Brigade Club who has a boyfriend.

- Takada (高田)
  - voiced by: Hiroshi Kamiya

A man in a relationship with Nitta, a very normal gentle-looking guy with glasses. He described the members of Bear Lab as "there are people who seem to have a strong prejudice", and described Mikan as the most beautiful woman in Bear Lab.

==== Mikan's classmates ====
- Nobara (のばら)
  - voiced by: Masayo Kurata

A girl with a laid-back, easy-going, and kind personality. She is Mikan's classmate. She is not named after her in the original work. He is good at praising her classmates, finding good points and honestly praising them.

- Mie (ミエ, Mie)
  - voiced by: Yuri Shiratori

She longs for a sailor suit, and she has been to school in a sailor suit under the influence of Miyajima-sensei's story of "What you can only do now."

- Tsukamoto (塚本)
  - voiced by: Takahiro Yoshimizu

He has a rectangular face. Only appears on the anime.

- Ōyama (塚本, Ooyama)
  - voiced by: Mari Maruta

She belongs to the tennis club. Only appears on the anime.

- Mori (森)
  - voiced by: Nobuyuki Hiyama

His house is so close to the school that it takes less than two minutes. Only appears on the anime.

- Yamada (山田)
  - voiced by: Junko Minagawa

She has a mature appearance and is rather beautiful. She likes Shimi-chan, but she doesn't like Mikan's childish behavior and remarks when she's with her.

- Kaori (かおり)
  - voiced by: Chieko Atarashi

Mikan's friend since elementary school.

- Iguchi (井口)

According to Mikan, he is a "normal" boy, but her mother, who saw his photo, criticized him as "a face that will definitely cause problems for women in the future."

- Kubota (久保田)
  - voiced by: Kōsuke Okano

He has an indecisive personality. Mikan's mother praised him as "handsome enough to be an actor," but Mikan denies it. Only appears on anime.

- Yamamoto (山本)
  - voiced by: Takeharu Ōnishi

Mikan's mother praised him for being handsome, but he has a long face that earned him the nickname "Moai." Only appears on anime.

- Murata (村田)
  - voiced by: Masashi Kitamura

He had a crush on Emiko, but it's one-sided love. Only appears on anime.

- Emi (エミ)
  - voiced by: Akemi Kanda

Anime-only character. Her mother, whose hobby is baking bread, also appeared.

==== Mikan's teachers ====
- Mr. Miyazaki (宮嶋先生, Miyazaki-sensei)
  - voiced by: Ken Shiroyama; Kōichi Tōchika (young)

Mikan's classic literature teacher. A teacher with white hair and glasses.During class, he often talks about his own experiences and thoughts (however, the students don't like that), and Mikan is often interested in the story.

- Mr. Murakami (村上先生, Murakami-sensei)
  - voiced by: Shinichiro Ohta

Mikan's homeroom teacher. In charge of world history. His students affectionately call him "Murakami-chan" behind his back.

- Ms. Ogawa (小川先生, Ogawa-sensei)
  - voiced by: Yūko Nagashima→Kaoru Shimamura→Masako Katsuki

Mikan's physical education teacher.

- Ms. Hitomi (ひとみ先生, Hitomi-sensei)
  - voiced by: Akiko Takeguchi

The homeroom teacher of the class next to Mikan. In charge of mathematics in Mikan's class.

- Mr. Satō (佐藤先生, Satou-sensei)
  - voiced by: Takashi Nagasako

Mikan's art teacher. His nickname is "Satosen". His real name "Satō" was revealed in the second season.

- Physics Teacher (物理の先生, Butsuri no sensei)
  - voiced by: Kazuo Oka
- Kanji Teacher (漢文の先生, Kanbun no sensei)
  - voiced by: Hidenari Ugaki
- Mr. Takabe (高部先生, Takabe-sensei)
  - voiced by: Hidenari Ugaki
- English Teacher (英語の先生, Eigo no sensei)
  - voiced by: Nobuaki Sekine
- English Teacher 2 (英語の先生2, Eigo no sensei 2)
  - voiced by: Yumi Tōma
- English Teacher 3 (英語の先生3, Eigo no sensei 3)
  - voiced by: Show Hayami
- Physical Education Teacher (体育の先生, Taikuu no sensei)
  - voiced by: Takahiro Yoshimizu

==== Mikan's high school acquaintances ====
- Tomomi (智美)
  - voiced by: Junko Shimakata
- Aihara (相原)
  - voiced by: Yuki Matsuoka
- Kumi (クミ)
  - voiced by: Akemi Kanda
- Emiko (エミコ)
  - voiced by: Ayako Kawasumi
- Miyata (宮田)
  - voiced by: Hiroki Shimowada

==== Mikan's elementary school friends ====
- Pi-chan (ピーちゃん)
  - voiced by: Taeko Kawata
- Hiro (ヒロ, Hiro)
  - voiced by: Fujiko Takimoto
- Ichiko Yoshida (吉田一子, Yoshida Ichiko)
  - voiced by: Miwa Matsumoto→Yukiko Amada
- Okazaki (岡崎)
  - voiced by :Mai Kadowaki
- Sano (佐野)
  - voiced by: Hiroko Taguchi
- Moriya (守屋)
- Yamamoto (山本)
  - voiced by: Akiko Suzuki
- Tanaka (田中, Tanaka)
  - voiced by: Tomoko Kaneda

==== Mikan's middle school friends ====
- Yokota (横田)
  - voiced by: Hiroki Shimowada
- Oyama (小山)
  - voiced by: Kōki Miyata
- Aki (アキ)
  - voiced by: Yuki Matsuoka

==== Mikan's friends' parents ====
- Shimi-chan's Mother (しみちゃんのお母さん, Shimi-chan no okaa-san)
- Yukarin's Mother (ゆかりんのお母さん, Yukarin no okaa-san)
  - voiced by: Akemi Okamura
- Rio's Mother (理央のお母さん, Rio no okaa-san)
  - voiced by: Ryoka Yuzuki
- Rio's Father (理央のお父さん, Rio no otou-san)
  - voiced by: Kōji Totani
- Mr. Hachi (ハチおじさん, Hachi-ojisan)
  - voiced by: Shinpachi Tsuji
- Emi's Mother (エミのお母さん, Emi no okaa-san)
  - voiced by: Gara Takashima

==== Mikan's other acquaintances ====
- Ruri Kurata (倉田ルリ, Kurata Ruri)
  - voiced by: Megumi Nasu
- Dan (ダン)
  - voiced by: Tōru Ōkawa
- Bakery Manager and His Wife (パン屋の店長と妻, Pan-ya no tencho to tsuma)
  - voiced by: Minoru Inaba (Bakery Manager), Hiromi Nishikawa (Bakery Manager's Wife)
- A-kun (A君)
- Dentist (歯医者, Haisha)
  - voiced by: Takahiro Yoshimizu→Jun Hattori→Daiki Nakamura
- Dentist Assistant (歯科助手, Shika joshu)
  - voiced by: Haruka Kamiya
- Receptionist (受付, Uketsuke)
  - voiced by: Shino Kakinuma→Sayuri Yoshida

=== People related to Mother ===
==== Mother's closest relatives ====
- Mizushima (水島)
  - voiced by: Rikako Aikawa

Mother's friend. She is Jun's mother, one of Mikan's elementary school classmate. She is 45 years old. She is active and has many hobbies. She is the type to "think up and act immediately". She often enjoys shopping with other members, and invites her to Ginza, mountain climbing, and pottery. She is especially close to her mother, who goes to swimming school together. She is good at making things by hand, she makes kamaboko and datemaki.

- Toyama (戸山)
  - voiced by: Sakiko Tamagawa

Mother's friend. A relatively elegant impression among the three. She wears square glasses with rounded edges, which she rarely removes, with the exception of episode 18 of season 2 of the anime. Her undressed figure looks just like her daughter. Her favorite phrase is "Oh, it's nice (あら、いいじゃなーい, Ara, Iijana~i)". Although she doesn't seem to match with Mother and Mizushima, she actually gets along with her because she's a big-hearted and friendly person (her way of thinking is similar).

- Misumi (三角)
  - voiced by: Nana Yamaguchi

Mother's friend. She has the most common sense among the four, and is often taken aback by Mother's irrelevant remarks. On the other hand, when she travels to Kyoto, she dresses up as a maiko (apprentice geisha), tries to eat while standing near the station, and is influenced by her friends to reach the same level. She appears the least of the four.

- Machiko Ōwada (Ms. Hohoemi) (大和田マチコ（ホホエミさん）, Oowada Machiko (Hohoemi-san))
  - voiced by: Naoko Watanabe

Miss Mizushima's friends. She is 40 years old. "Hohoemi-san" is a nickname given by Mother who can't remember her name (she once called her "Hohoemi-san"). Mizushima doesn't call her "Hohoemi-san" in the original, but she usually calls her "Machiko-san" in the anime, but there was a time when she called her "Hohoemi-san" only once in the first season of the anime.

==== Mother's relatives ====
- Grandma (ばーちゃん, Baa-chan)
  - voiced by: Mizuka Arima; Minako Tsutsu (young Grandma)

Mother's mother. She is Mikan and Yuzuhiko's maternal grandmother. She speaks fluent Kyushu dialect. Her face shape is just like mother, and she has a stubborn and stingy personality just like mother. Like mother, her cooking was bad, but her mother's taste was Chikuzenni (her ingredients and seasoning changed depending on her mood).

- Grandpa (じーちゃん, Jii-chan)
  - voiced by: Hiroshi Ito

Mother's father. She is Mikan and Yuzuhiko's maternal grandfather. He seems to have adapted to the times, and refused mother's gift of a hot spring trip on the grounds that "the toilet must have a washlet." Father even laughed at him, saying, "Times have changed."

- Cousin A, Cousin B, Cousin C/Hiro-kun (いとこA、いとこB、いとこC/ヒロくん)
  - voiced by: Masako Miura (Cousin A); Makoto Tsumura (Cousin B); Misato Fukuen (Cousin C/Hiro-kun)

Mother's nephew. During they childhood, their played with Mikan and Yuzuhiko at Mother's parents' house. One of them, nicknamed "Hiro-kun," took a nap right after drinking the juice, causing a rare incident in which a large swarm of ants gathered in his mouth.

==== Mother's neighbors ====
- An Suzuki/Koshino (鈴木 / 越野あん, Suzuki/Koshino An)
  - voiced by: Kimiko Saitō

A housewife who lives next door to the Tachibana family. She works as a mangaka and she has two assistants.

- Hakamada (袴田)
  - voiced by: Miki Itō

A young housewife who lives on the same floor of the same apartment as the Tachibana family. Her son is Tatkun, who feels strangely attached to Yuzuhiko.

- Suzuki (鈴木)

A neighbor of the Tachibana family who lived in front of Koshino, who appears only in the original work. She gave some dried fish to mother. The story of dried fish is replaced by Koshino instead of Suzuki in the anime.

==== Mother's acquaintances ====
- Mori (坂田)
  - voiced by: Yoshino Takamori

A friend of mother's calligraphy club. She has an elegant personality and doesn't get along well with mother.

- Sakata (坂田)
  - voiced by: Rei Sakuma
- Yamazaki (山崎)
  - voiced by: Mami
- Kimura (木村)
  - voiced by: Hiroko Emori
- Yamamura (山村)
  - voiced by: Sayuri Sadaoka
- Ikeuchi (池内)
  - voiced by: Miya Hanaki
- Nezu (根津)
  - voiced by: Kei Hayami
- Yokoyama (横山)
  - voiced by: Iruka Nanami
- Nakajima (中島)
  - voiced by: Michie Tomizawa

==== Mother's high school friends ====
- Kurita (栗田)
  - voiced by: Toshihiko Nakajima
- Shūzō Tsukioka (月岡修造, Tsukioka Shuuzou)
  - voiced by: Shingo Hiromori; Kenji Nojima (young)
- Kumada (熊田)
  - voiced by: Tomie Takaoka
- Meganezaru (メガネザル)
  - voiced by: Kissei Kumamoto

==== Mother's favorite store clerks ====
- Pastry Shop Clerk (洋菓子店員, Yougashi tenin)
  - voiced by: Tomoko Kawakami
- Hairdresser (美容師, Biyoushi)
  - voiced by: Misa Watanabe
- Coffee Shop Manager (マスター, Masuta-)
  - voiced by: Takashi Nagasako (TV series); Masafumi Kimura (2nd movie)
- Mr. Glasses Customer (メガネさん, Megane-san)
  - voiced: Tomomichi Nishimura

==== Mother's other acquaintances ====
- Landlord (大家さん, Ooya-san)
  - voiced: Fujiko Takimoto
- Eijirō Hashimoto (橋本英二郎, Hashimoto Eijirou)
  - voiced: Jouji Nakata
- Pottery Class Teacher (陶芸教室の先生, Tougei kyoushitsu no sensei)
  - voiced: Michihiro Ikemizu
- Lucy (ルーシー)
  - voiced by: Masako Katsuki

=== People related to Yuzuhiko ===
==== Yuzuhiko's middle school ====
- Fujino (藤野)
  - voiced by: Kappei Yamaguchi

Yuzuhiko's classmate and best friend. Initially envious of Yuzuhiko, who has her older sister, he is deeply in love with Mikan (even though he has only seen her face for a moment), but later portrays him as having a crush on Sudo. He talks a lot, and his thoughts come out easily.

- Nasuo Arai (新井ナスオ(那須野), Arai Nasuo)
  - voiced by: Kōki Miyata→Mitsuki Saiga→Mizuki Otsuka

Yuzuhiko's classmate. He often joins Yuzuhiko and Fujino. A fan of Marumi Maruno, just like Yuzuhiko. He is insensitive. He is good at mimicry. Yuzuhiko thinks Nasuo is troublesome because he interprets other people's stories in his own way and spreads them as rumors. He also knows the fact that Fujino has a crush on Sudo.

- Yuri Ishida (石田ゆり, Ishida Yuri)
  - voiced by: Etsuko Kozakura

Yuzuhiko's classmate. She is a little conscious of Yuzuhiko. Her words and actions are absurd and difficult for those around her to understand, but Yuzuhiko can generally understand them accurately. She also often ends his words with "~nanoda", and sometimes sings "Papopoppapo" (from the anime).

- Sudo (須藤)
  - voiced by: Kyōko Hikami

Yuzuhiko's classmate. She has a witty personality and is a good understanding of Ishida. She is also good friends with Yuzuhiko and Fujino. Her dislikes are cabbage rolls and Fukujinzuke. Yuzuhiko called her "Sudo-san (rarely Sudo-chan)", Fujino called her "Sudo-chan", and Ishida called her "Sudo".

- Kawashima (川島)
  - voiced by: Wasabi Mizuta

Yuzuhiko's classmate. She is jealous and often gets angry with Ishida and Sudo, who are on good terms with Yuzuhiko. She forms Yuzuhiko's fan club with Yamashita.

- Yamashita (山下)
  - voiced by: Yōko Teppōzuka

Yuzuhiko's classmate. Kawashima's best friend. Like Kawashima, she likes Yuzuhiko and is overjoyed just by talking to him, but compared to the runaway Kawashima, her affection falls within the category of common sense.

- Ms. Hara (原先生, Hara-sensei)
  - voiced by: Noriko Uemura

A middle-aged female teacher who is Yuzuhiko's homeroom teacher. She has a persistent and sticky personality with a glaring look and a dull voice, and she never forgives any leftovers from students' school lunch.

==== Yuzuhiko's classmates ====
- Oyamada (小山田)
  - voiced by: Mitsuki Saiga→Yasuhiro Takato→Kenji Nojima

Yuzuhiko's friend from different class. He joins baseball club and recruited Yuzuhiko and Fujino to the understaffed baseball club (from the second season of the anime). In the early days of the first season of the anime, he was only credited as "Boy A".

- Fukuzawa (福沢)
  - voiced by: Eri Miyajima

A female honor student who often says "I can't do anything", "I've already thrown it away", and "Seriously 0 points" while getting the highest score in the grade. She is good at history.

- Lina Andō (安藤里奈, Andou Rina)
  - voiced by: Miwa Kōzuki

Presented as the most popular girl in her class among girls and boys alike.

- Kawai (河合)
  - voiced by: Fujiko Takimoto→Mayumi Yamaguchi→Youko Wakana

She was in love with Yuzuhiko, and took advantage of the gift he gave to Fujino, who was craving chocolate for Valentine's Day, and gave it to her favorite, Yuzuhiko.

==== Yuzuhiko's teachers ====
- Mr. Hayashi (林先生, Hara-sensei)
  - voiced by: Kazu Koseki

Mathematics teacher. As a punishment for students who arrive late to class, he requires them to answer math problems.

- Physical Education Teacher (体育の先生, Taikuu no sensei)
  - voiced by: Yasunori Matsumoto→Hisao Egawa→Tetsu Inada

Physical education teacher. A typical P.E. teacher who likes P.E. Even in the middle of winter, he wears short-sleeved shirts to class, so he's called a "crazy guy."

- Mr. Katō (加藤先生, Katou-sensei)
  - voiced by: Minoru Inaba

Known as "Katosen". He is characterized by a languid way of speaking with a local accent, and is often imitated by his students.

- Art Teacher (美術の先生, Bijutsu no sensei)
  - voiced by: Ryōtarō Okiayu
- History Teacher (歴史の先生, Rekishi no sensei)
  - voiced by: Ryūji Nakagi
- Mr. Karasawa (唐沢先生, Karasawa sensei)
  - voiced by: Kazuhiro Nakata; Katsumi Suzuki (season 1)
- Miyuki Fujisawa (藤沢ミユキ, Fujisawa Miyuki)
  - voiced by: Satsuki Yukino

==== Yuzuhiko's baseball upperclassmen ====
- Yoshida (古田)
  - voiced by: Yūichi Iguchi
- Ōno (大野)
  - voiced by: Hitoshi Yanai
- Club Adviser (顧問, Komon)
  - voiced by: Ikkyu Juku

==== Yuzuhiko's other acquaintances ====
- Barber (理容師, Riyoshi)
  - voiced by: Yōsuke Akimoto
- Tatkun (たっくん, Takkun)
  - voiced by: Sumomo Momomori
- Miho (ミホ)
  - voiced by: Kozue Kamata
- Satoshi (サトシ)
  - voiced by: Omi Minami
- Roshi (老師)
  - voiced by: Yuzuru Fujimoto

==== Yuzuhiko's idols ====
- Marumi Maruno (丸野丸美, Maruno Marumi)
  - voiced by: Youko Wakana
- Yoko-rin (ヨーコリン, Yokorin)
  - voiced by: Naoko Takano

=== People related to Father ===
==== Father's closest relatives ====
- Kawayanagi/Hiroshi (川柳 / ヒロシ)
  - voiced by: Mantarō Iwao

Father's friend. A man from the same hometown as Father, he is a dandy, slender gentleman compared to Father. He gets along well with father, and goes to an izakaya run by a young couple with him, exchanging glasses and complaining about various things. His hobby is senryu, and he once brought in a haiku book he wrote himself and showed it to Father.

- Inoue Couple (井上夫妻, Inoue Fusai)
  - voiced by: Takashi Taguchi (Master); Ren Kato (young); Orie Kimoto (Mako)

A couple who runs a pub where Father and Hiroshi frequent visited. The husband's name has not been revealed, but he is 46 years old. In the anime she was given the last name "Inoue". In the first period, she only appeared in her husband (however, she did not speak at that time), but in the second season, Mako also appeared, and the master also began to speak.

- Father's Mother (父の母, Chichi no Haha)

She is Mikan Yuzuhiko's paternal grandmother, and she died when Mikan was 3 years old (Yuzuhiko was born a month after her grandmother's death). She was suddenly hospitalized and Father returned to Kyushu, but as a result of her surgery, it turned out that she was already too late. When Father returned to his parents' home in Ōita, he cried alone in front of her portrait (Mother said it was the only tears she had ever seen of him).

- Aunt (叔母, Oba)
  - voiced by: Chizuko Hoshino

Mikan and Yuzuhiko's aunt.

==== Father's other acquaintances ====
- Tanaka (田中)
  - voiced by: Ken Narita

Father's colleague from same company.

- Yamada (山田)
  - voiced by: Hiroshi Naka

Father acquaintance from Oita. He works for a large company called Tokairin Shoji. He is nicknamed "Satsumaage-san" by Mother and Mikan because his head resembles a satsumaage. He had come to drink with Father, but he forgot his company documents and left.

- Mitsuko Baisho (倍賞 美津子, Baishō Mitsuko)
  - voiced by: Kaoru Morota

The actress whose father into. When father watches programs featuring Mrs. Baisho, he only watches scenes where she is shown. Mother says she is the same type as herself, saying she is a big-mouthed, strong-willed woman.

- Katsuyoshi (勝義)
  - voiced by: Katsuhisa Hōki

Father's uncle that has a strict personality.

- Katsuyoshi (勝弘)
  - voiced by: Kenji Nojima, Yukiko Amada (child)

Katsuyoshi's son. He was naughty in his childhood.

- Ichiro Yamakawa (山川一郎, Yamakawa Ichirou)

An acquaintance of father. Anime original character. His names only appeared in the second season.

== Media ==
=== Manga ===
Written and illustrated by Eiko Kera, the Atashinchi manga began serialization in the Yomiuri Shimbun in June 1994 and ran until March 2012. The first tankōbon volume was released by Media Factory on April 26, 1995. The manga returned with a new serialization in December 2019.

The manga has been translated and published in Chinese and Korean, and the anime is also broadcast in South Korea, Taiwan, Hong Kong, Indonesia, Malaysia, and India.

=== Anime ===
==== Atashin'chi ====
An anime adaptation produced by Shin-Ei Animation aired on TV Asahi from April 19, 2002, to September 19, 2009, for 330 episodes. Akitaro Daichi served as director from episode 1 to 4 with Tetsuo Yasumi, while Motoi Sakuraba composed the music.

The official Atashin'chi YouTube channel began streaming the first two episodes with English subtitles on May 15, 2020. TV Asahi, Shin-Ei Animation and AlphaBoat are planning on streaming about 270 episodes in their original order until March 2021. The final episode of the series aired on YouTube on August 3, 2022.

==== Shin Atashin'chi ====
Shin Atashin'chi, a sequel to the original 2002 anime series, aired on Animax from October 6, 2015, to April 5, 2016, for 26 episodes. Shin-Ei Animation returned for the series' production. Ogura Hirofumi served as director, Akifumi Tada composed the music, while the original creator Eiko Kera wrote stories specifically for the series.

Crunchyroll began simulcasting the series outside of Asia on October 6, 2015.

=== Movie ===
==== Atashin'chi Movie ====
On December 6, 2003, to commemorate the 45th anniversary of TV Asahi, the animated movie "Atashin'chi the Movie (Japanese: 映画 あたしンち, Hepburn: Eiga Atashinchi)" which depicts the change of Mother and Mikan, was released. This film distributed by Toei Company. The director is Tetsuo Yasumi from a screenplay Kazuyuki Ryosawa and Natsuko Takahashi. Akiko Yano participated in this movie by singing the theme song.

Even before the start of Atashin'chi broadcast on TV Asahi, TV Asahi and Toei planned to release this film. Before its release, TV Asahi and Toei said, "We want to make a series that lasts for 10 years and 20 years as a national animation as a work that the whole family can enjoy," and set the target box office revenue of 3 billion yen under "Doraemon movie" Despite an unusual campaign in which 10 of the main character's visited places where there were requests for business trips such as personal events all over the country, the box office revenue was 900 million yen, falling short of the target, and it was not made into a series.

It was screened in Taiwan from February 9, 2007, and in Hong Kong from January 17, 2008, recording the highest ticket sales in the second week of its release.

==== Atashin'chi 3D Movie ====
In the second movie, a 3D movie " Atashin'chi 3D Movie (Japanese: 劇場版3D あたしンち 情熱のちょ〜超能力♪ 母大暴走!, Hepburn: Gekijouban 3D Movie Atashin'chi : Jounetsu no Chou Chounouryoku Haha Dai Bousou)" was released on November 13, 2010. This film distributed by Toei Distribution. The length of this film is 43 minutes. Shin-ei Animation's first 3D movie. The director is Wataru Takahashi, who is making his feature film directorial debut. Screenplay by Hiroshi Ohnogi. Yoko Yazawa is in charge of the theme song. In addition, Tetsuo Yasumi, who was in charge of directing the previous work and the TV series, will be in charge of supervision.

The slogan is "I will announce it! My mother can now use her supernatural powers!!"

Although it was released on a small scale of 89 screens nationwide, it is popular among elementary school students and their parents, accounting for 80% of the total. Ranked 9th for the first time in the ranking (according to Kogyo Tsushin).

It was also screened overseas, in Taiwan from January 21, 2011, and in Hong Kong from February 10, 2011.

== Opening and ending themes ==
=== Openings ===
1. 「さらば」/"Saraba" by Kinmokusei (Episodes 1–142)
2. 「あたしンちの唄」/"Atashin'chi no Uta" by Kyōko Koizumi (Episodes 143–297)
3. 「プロリンサイズ♪」/"Purorin Size" by Morisanchuu (Episodes 298–330)
4. 「Let's Go! あたしンち」/"Let's Go! Atashin'chi" by The Tachibanas (Kumiko Watanabe, Fumiko Orikasa, Daisuke Sakaguchi, Kenichi Ogata) (Shin Atashin'chi)

=== Endings ===
1. 「来て来てあたしンち」/"Kite Kite Atashin'chi" by Aya Hirayama, adapted from Sir Edward Elgar's Pomp and Circumstance Marches (Episodes 1–161, 328)
2. 「Let's Go! あたしンち」/"Let's Go! Atashin'chi" by The Tachibanas (Kumiko Watanabe, Fumiko Orikasa, Daisuke Sakaguchi, Kenichi Ogata) (Episodes 162–232, 329)
3. 「ほっとっとっとな まいにち」/"Hottottotto na Mainichi" by Kigurumichiko (Episodes 233–304)
4. 「プロリンサイズ♪」/"Purorin Size" by Morisanchuu (Episodes 305–327)
5. 「さらば」/"Saraba" by Kinmokusei (Episode 330)
6. [ろっか・ばい・まい・べいびい] /"Rock-a-Bye My Baby" by Haruomi Hosono (Shin Atashin'chi)

==== Movie ====
1. 「あたしンち」/"Atashin'chi" by Akiko Yano (Atashin'chi Movie)
2. "SUGAR!SUGAR!!SUGAR!!!" by Yoko Yazawa (Atashin'chi 3D Movie)

=== Inserts ===
1. Karaoke tengoku (カラオケ天国) by Mikan (Fumiko Orikasa)
2. Jounetsu no akai bara (情熱の赤いバラ) by Mother (Kumiko Watanabe)
