= Takasago Volunteers =

Indigenous Taiwanese soldiers in the Imperial Japanese Army

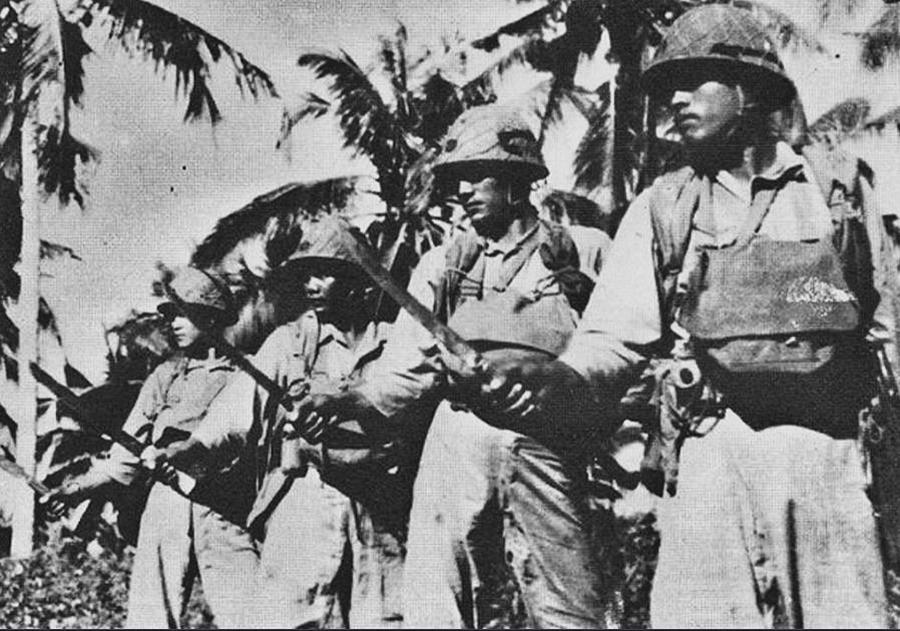
Takasago Volunteers

Takasago volunteers (高砂義勇隊, Takasago Giyūtai) were volunteer soldiers in the Imperial Japanese Army, recruited from Taiwanese indigenous peoples (also known as Taiwanese aborigines) during World War II. The Takasago volunteers are distinguished from the Taiwanese volunteers of ethnic Han or other Chinese descent.

== Background and history ==
After the Empire of Japan's annexation of Taiwan as a result of the First Sino-Japanese War in 1894, the Japanese government pursued a policy of cultural assimilation, directed especially towards the various groups of Taiwanese aborigines.

The Imperial Japanese Army was interested in the use of Taiwanese indigenous people in special forces operations, as they were viewed as being more physically capable of operating in the tropical and sub-tropical regions in Southeast Asia than ethnic Japanese, and, coming from a hunter-gatherer culture, would be able to operate with minimal logistics support.

The Japanese military recruited many young men from friendly indigenous groups into service shortly before the start of World War II. The total number was confidential and estimates on the numbers recruited range from 1,800 to 5,000 men. Training was under the direction of officers from the Nakano School, which specialized in insurgency and guerilla warfare.

Initially assigned to transport and supply units, as the war condition progressively deteriorated for Imperial Japanese forces, Takasago volunteers were later sent to frontline areas as combat troops (before ethnic Chinese Taiwanese volunteers used in the same way). Units consisting entirely of Takasago volunteers served with distinction in the Philippines, Netherlands East Indies, Solomon Islands and New Guinea (including the Kokoda Track), where they fought against American and Australian forces.

Towards the end of the war, 15 officers and 45 enlisted members of the Takasago Volunteers were organized into the Kaoru Special Attack Corps for a suicide mission similar to that of the Giretsu Kuteitai, and attacked a United States Army Air Forces landing strip on Leyte. The Takasago Volunteers were well known for their jungle survival ability.

The most notable Takasago Volunteer is Teruo Nakamura (Attun Palalin), the last confirmed Japanese holdout, who surrendered on Morotai Island in Indonesia in December 1974. Nakamura was an Amis volunteer and was discovered 29 years, 3 months, and 16 days after the Japanese Instrument of Surrender was signed in August 1945, having lived in solitude in the jungle for almost 20 years after leaving other holdouts in 1956.

== See also ==
- Taiwanese Imperial Japan Serviceman
- Taiwan under Japanese rule
