= Sora Inoue =

Sora Inoue may refer to:

- The artist of the manga Samurai Girl: Real Bout High School and Mai Ball!
- Sora Inoue, a fictional character of Bleach
