= Masashi Ito =

Masashi Itō may refer to:

- Masashi Ito (baseball) (伊藤 将司, born 1996), Japanese professional baseball pitcher
- Masashi Itō (伊藤 正, 1921–2004), machine-gunner
