= Prétear =

Japanese manga and anime series

- First volume of the ADV Manga English release of Prétear

新白雪姫伝説プリーティア (Shin Shirayuki-hime Densetsu Purītia)
- Genre: Magical girl, reverse harem, romance
- Manga
- Written by: Junichi Sato
- Illustrated by: Kaori Naruse
- Published by: Kadokawa Shoten
- English publisher: US: ADV Manga
- Magazine: Monthly Asuka Fantasy DX
- Original run: May 30, 2000 – July 18, 2001
- Volumes: 4
- Anime television series
- Directed by: Junichi Sato (chief); Kiyoko Sayama
- Produced by: Kei Fukura; Hirofumi Ōtsuki
- Written by: Kenichi Kanemaki
- Music by: Toshiyuki Ōmori
- Studio: Hal Film Maker
- Licensed by: AUS: Madman Entertainment; NA: Funimation
- Original network: WOWOW, TUT, ABS, KBS, SUN, KSB, GBS, Kids Station, TVN, TVQ, Tokyo MX
- English network: US: Anime Network
- Original run: April 4, 2001 – June 27, 2001
- Episodes: 13

Prétear (新白雪姫伝説プリーティア, Shin Shirayuki-hime Densetsu Purītia), also called Prétear - The New Legend of Snow White, is a manga series written by Junichi Sato and illustrated by Kaori Naruse. Spanning four volumes, the manga series was originally published in Japan by Kadokawa Shoten from May 2000 to July 2001, and published in English in North America by ADV Manga.

The series was adapted into a thirteen episode anime series by Hal Film Maker, Kadokawa Shoten, and Rondo Robe, and aired in Japan on WOWOW from April 4, 2001, to June 27, 2001. Geneon, now NBCUniversal Entertainment Japan, released the series' episodes across four volumes in Japan on both VHS and DVD, with ADV Films licensing and releasing it.

== Plot ==
High school student Himeno Awayuki is trying to adjust to her new life after her widowed father remarries the wealthy widow Natsue. While taking a shortcut to school, she encounters Hayate, the Knight of Wind, and gets into an argument with him; she attempts to punch him, but he blocks her hand, causing a powerful light to appear. She later meets the other Leafe Knights, who tell her that the red snow that has been recently falling in town is caused by the Princess of Disaster, who is awakening and using demon larva to absorb Leafe, the essence of all life. They ask Himeno to become the Prétear and help them protect the world, but she is initially reluctant, believing they are trying to play a trick on her. However, when a larva attacks them and begins to steal Leafe, she agrees to help and merges with Hayate to become the Wind Prétear. After adjusting to her new powers, she is able to defeat the larva.

As the series progresses, Himeno falls in love with Hayate, who is initially distant and refuses to acknowledge her as the Prétear. Eventually, she learns the Princess of Disaster was once a girl named Takako, who was the previous Prétear and did not enjoy fighting. She also fell in love with Hayate, and when he could not return her feelings, her anguish caused her powers to turn to evil, turning her into the Princess of Disaster.

Mawata, one of Himeno's stepsisters, who has been overwhelmed with grief since her father's death and has distanced herself from her family, temporarily bonds with Himeno over their shared feelings, but is hurt when she sees Himeno with Hayate. Mawata is in love with Sasame, but when it is revealed that he is in love with Takako, he leaves his position as a Leafe Knight and joins her to become her Knight of Darkness. Takako uses Mawata's love for Sasame to hurt her so that she can use her to fuel the Great Tree of Fenrir.

As the city is overrun by the Great Tree, Himeno reveals her status and powers as the Prétear to her family and begs them to flee while she rescues Mawata. However, they refuse to leave Mawata behind and put themselves in danger to save her. Hayate and Sasame engage in a fight to the death while Himeno climbs the Great Tree of Fenrir and Himeno's family begins to attack the bubble holding Mawata. Himeno continues up the Tree to confront the Princess of Disaster. Mawata is freed and safe in the arms of her family, but Takako does not want her to go and desperately calls for Sasame, who appears after defeating Hayate. Fenrir asks Sasame to kill both Hayate and Himeno, but Himeno convinces him not to. Believing that not even Sasame loves her, Takako tries to kill herself, but he shields her and dies, causing her to return to her true self after realizing that she loves Sasame as well. Out of control, the Tree captures Takako and Hayate sacrifices himself to protect Himeno as she tries to save her.

To stop the Tree, Himeno becomes the legendary White Prétear and pours out a massive amount of Leafe, which restores the town, heals the Leafe Knights, and revives Sasame and Hayate. Hayate awakens to find the others crying over Himeno's lifeless body, but she is revived after he kisses her. At the end of the series, Himeno and Hayate are a couple, Himeno and her family are closer, and Mawata and Takako and Sasame are happier.

== Characters ==
=== Awayuki family ===
Himeno Awayuki (淡雪 姫乃, Awayuki Himeno) is a sixteen-year-old girl and the protagonist of the series. After her mother's death and her father's remarriage, Himeno struggles to adjust to her new life in a high-class society as she is picked on both by her new family and her peers at school. As Himeno's alienation grows, she meets Hayate and the other Leafe Knights, who tell her that she is the Prétear who must save the world. Over the course of the series, she develops feelings for Hayate and falls in love with him. She is voiced by Sayuri Yoshida in Japanese and Luci Christian in English.
Mayune Awayuki (淡雪 繭根, Awayuki Mayune) is Natsue's eldest daughter, who is the same age as Himeno and has a pretentious attitude towards her because she comes from an impoverished family. However, she and Himeno reconcile after she saves her from the Great Tree of Fenrir, and she is the first to cry after trying to awaken Himeno after her death. She is voiced by Satsuki Yukino in Japanese and by Shelley Calene-Black in English.
Mawata Awayuki (淡雪 真綿, Awayuki Mawata) is a fourteen-year-old girl who is intelligent, calm, and seemingly the perfect child of the family. However, her calm demeanor is a facade to hide her loneliness and her grief following her father's death. Ultimately, Fenrir exploits her grief of losing her father and heartbreak over Sasame to fuel the Great Tree of Fenrir. She is voiced by Akemi Kanda in Japanese adaptation and by Mandy Clark in English.
Kaoru Awayuki (淡雪 薫, Awayuki Kaoru) is Himeno's father and a former author of romance novels, who stopped writing following the death of Himeno's mother. Before marrying Natsue, Kaoru spent much of his time drinking sake while Himeno balanced the budget and cooked their meals. In the anime, he becomes a sculptor after marrying Natsue. He is voiced by Yuji Ueda in Japanese and Jason Douglas in English.
Natsue Awayuki (淡雪 夏江, Awayuki Natsue) is a wealthy and powerful executive who married Kaoru, who she had a crush on, after her divorce, and is kind to him but strict with others. Her daughters are named after characters in her favorite book by him, Twin Princesses. Natsue is consumed by jealousy towards Kaoru's deceased wife and Himeno, treating her more harshly than her own daughters. Her hatred later causes her to be possessed by the Princess of Disaster. In the anime, Natsue is never possessed by the Princess of Disaster, she does not divorce her husband, who instead died, she does not show jealousy towards Kaoru's late wife, and while she is strict with Himeno, she cares for her well being. She is voiced by Kikuko Inoue in Japanese and Lauren Goodnight in English.

=== Leafe Knights ===
Hayate (颯, Hayate) is the Knight of Wind. He is initially hostile towards Himeno, refusing to acknowledge her as the new Prétear due to a past experience, but gradually begins to accept her after being impressed by her will and determination. Over time, he develops feelings for Himeno and eventually falls in love with her, going so far as to protect her and get a job at her estate working for her father. He is voiced by Kousuke Toriumi in Japanese and Illich Guardiola in English.
Sasame (細, Sasame) is the Knight of Sound. He has a job as a radio personality, where he addresses people's problems on the air. He is said to be a flirt, as the other Knights call him a playboy, but he is also a good listener and offers himself as a sounding board to Himeno. In the manga, he remains a Leafe Knight and seemingly falls in love with Himeno. In the anime, he later becomes Fenrir's Knight of Darkness after confessing that he was in love with Takako sixteen years ago, putting him against the Leafe Knights and the Prétear. As well, he is calmer and more serious and has an older appearance. He is voiced by Takahiro Sakurai in Japanese and Chris Patton in English.
Kei (蛍, Kei) is the Knight of Light. He works for an internet company and is the most practical and direct of the Knights, which sometimes leads to conflicts. In the anime, he is more of a narcissist, as evidenced by the numerous toys and pictures of himself in his work. He is voiced by Makoto Naruse in Japanese and Victor Carsrud in English.
Go (豪, Gō) is the Knight of Fire, who works as a waiter. He is voiced by Shotaro Morikubo in Japanese and Spike Spencer in English.
Mannen (万年, Mannen) is the Knight of Ice and the unstated leader of the younger members of the Leafe Knights. Along with his followers, Hajime and Shin, he died fighting the Princess of Disaster sixteen years ago and was reborn as a child. Hs is voiced by Akiko Yajima in Japanese and Greg Ayres in English.
Hajime (初, Hajime) is the Knight of Water and the second youngest member of the Leafe Knights. Along with Mannen and Shin, he died fighting the Princess of Disaster sixteen years ago and was reborn as a child. He is voiced by Misato Fukuen in Japanese and Hilary Haag in English.
Shin (新, Shin) is the Knight of Plants and the youngest member of the Leafe Knights. He can use his abilities to heal plants, and is sensitive to others hurting them. Along with Mannen and Hajime, Shin died sixteen years ago while fighting the Princess of Disaster and was reborn as a child. In the manga, when he fuses with Himeno, he dies due to the Prétear having to draw Leafe from a knight to fight, but is later revived. In the anime, the need for the Prétear to use a knight's Leafe is not shown, and Shin is the only knight who is never shown fusing with her. He is also shown to have the ability to seal demon larvae and create barriers around a battle to protect the environment from harm. He is voiced by Tamaki Nakanishi in Japanese and Sasha Paysinger in English.

=== Other characters ===
Mr. Tanaka (田中, Tanaka) is the Awayuki's butler/chauffeur. He and Natsue used to go to school together, with him harboring a crush on her while she pursued other interests. He once offered Natsue a ride, which led to him being employed as the Awayuki's chauffeur. He is voiced by Takehito Koyasu in Japanese and Paul Sidello in English.
Yayoi Takato (高斗 弥生, Takato Yayoi) is Himeno's friend from middle school and her schoolmate, having transferred to her school with her. In the anime, their earlier friendship is never mentioned, and it is implied that they became friends at school after Yayoi ignored bullies telling her to stay away from Himeno. Her personality is also changed into that of a hopeless romantic who spins outrageous scenarios about the pursuit of love. She is voiced by Yukari Tamura in Japanese and Monica Rial in English.
Fenrir, the Princess of Disaster (災妃フェンリル, Saihi Fenriru), whose real name is Takako (貴子, Takako), is the main antagonist of the series. She was the previous Prétear before Himeno and fell in love with Hayate, but he was unable to reciprocate her feelings, causing her to turn her powers towards evil. As Fenrir, Takako's goal is to destroy the world by taking away the Leafe that preserves all life. In the anime, Sasame confesses that he had loved her and, although she does not return his feelings, she has him become her Knight of Darkness and orders him to kill Hayate and attack the other Leafe Knights. At the end of the series, after Sasame's death, Takako's realization that he loved her along with Himeno's kindness allow her to regain her humanity and return to normal. She is last seen with the revived Sasame, with them having become a couple. Takako also assumes the form of a maid at the Awayuki estate named Mikage (美景, Mikage) who is friendly with Himeno and company and provides advice to Himeno and Mawata. She is voiced by Yui Horie in Japanese and Kaytha Coker in English.

=== Demons ===
Forces of darkness eventually controlled by Fenrir that seek to drain the Leafe out of other life forms, similar to parasites. Although this is instantaneous toward plant life, more complicated organisms such as animals take longer to drain.

- Demon Larvae: Appear throughout the series starting in episode 1. They have the power of environmental merging and changing their size.
- Water Demon: Appears in episodes 1 and 2. It has a body made of water with tentacles coming out of it.
- Trash Demon: Appears in episode 2. It has two heads and a thick turtle shell.
- Bicycle Demon: Appears in episode 3. It has detached body parts with tentacles coming out of them.
- Soil Demon: Appears in episode 4. It has the power to jump high.
- Transport Demons: Appear throughout the series starting in episode 5. They have the power of flight, and in episode 11 one was shown to be capable of growing in size.
- Electric Demon: Appears in episode 5. It has the power to conduct electricity with its head bulb.
- Building Demon: Appears in episodes 6, 7, and 8. It has the power to phase through matter, burrow, spawn decoys, and fire a purple energy beam from its top.
- Great Tree of Fenrir: Appears in episodes 11, 12, and 13. Powers include large destructive vines, size growth, regeneration, and spawning demon larvae.

== Production ==
Anime director Junichi Satou created Prétear out of his desire to work on a series for women that featured good-looking boys. Wanting to base the story on a fairy tale, he asked himself what Snow White and the Seven Dwarfs would be like if the dwarfs were replaced with cute guys. As the story took shape, Leafe became the symbol of the apple in the story, as it pass on its life force to others, like a regular apple when eaten, or take away life, as the poison apple did in the original story. Feeling that the concept of a woman being rescued by "Prince Charming" was old-fashioned and not fitting with modern girls, he decided to make Prétear's "Snow White", Himeno, a more assertive woman.

Though an anime director himself, Satou did not direct the anime adaptation of Prétear. Kiyoko Sayama directed the series, while Satou provided consultation and checked the scripts and storyboards before they were animated. The anime characters were designed by Akemi Kobayashi, who made changes to the characters for the new story. For example, Hayate's anime version has longer hair tied in a ponytail, while in the manga, Hayate had cut off his longer hair before the start. The design of Kei is the most drastically changed in the adaptation, with the anime version bearing little resemblance to the original.

== Media ==
=== Manga ===
Written by Junichi Satou and illustrated by Kaori Naruse, the Prétear manga series was published in Japan by Kadokawa Shoten. The first volume was released on June 1, 2000, and the fourth and final volume was released on July 21, 2001. All four volumes have been published in English in North America by ADV Manga.

==== Volume list ====
No.	Original release date	Original ISBN	English release date	English ISBN
1	June 1, 2000	4-04-853203-0	May 25, 2004	978-1413901443
Chapter 1-5; Hang in there, Mr. Tanaka
2	March 1, 2001	4-04-853329-0	September 7, 2004	978-1413901450
Chapter 6-10; Afterward
3	April 1, 2001	4-04-853342-8	October 4, 2004	978-1413901467
Chapter 11-13; About the Anime
4	July 21, 2001	4-04-853392-4	January 18, 2005	978-1413901474
Chapter 14-18; Epilogue

=== Anime ===
Hal Film Maker, Kadokawa Shoten, and Rondo Robe collaborated to adapt the manga chapters into an anime series that premiered in Japan on WOWOW on April 4, 2001, and ran for 13 episodes until June 27, 2001. Geneon, now NBCUniversal Entertainment Japan, released the series' episodes across four volumes in Japan in both VHS video and DVD forms. ADV Films licensed and released the anime series. Funimation has re-licensed the series.

The series has two pieces of theme music. The opening theme, "White Destiny", is sung by Yoko Ishida, while the ending theme, "Lucky Star", is sung by Sayuri Yoshida.

==== Episode list ====
No.	Title	Original release date
1	"The Wind of Fate" "Unmei no kaze" (運命の風)	April 4, 2001
Himeno Awayuki struggles as she relives her life into nobility. When running late for school, she unexpectedly sees red snow falling from the sky. Though the other Leafe Knights want to search for the Prétear, Hayate disagrees with this idea. Himeno later bumps into Hayate, who realizes that she is the Prétear from touching her hand during their quarrel. Sasame tells her of her destiny, while Go explains her role with the Leafe Knights. She rejects what they say until a water demon appears and absorbs leafe energy, causing Himeno to run away. However, she returns to accept her fate, allowing Hayate to merge into her.
2	"Let Me Hear Your Heart Flutter" "Tokimeki wo kikasete" (トキメキを聴かせて)	April 11, 2001
Himeno, using Hayate's wind sword, breaks through the core of the water demon, thereby destroying it and restoring the leafe energy. Himeno is surprised to find out from Kei and Go that the Leafe Knights act as a sword or shield for the Prétear in battle. Sasame merges into Himeno as a trial run, in which she is able to hear sounds from far distances and project a sonic arrow from her mouth. Himeno views Sasame as one who encourages her to become stronger, different from how she views Hayate. Meanwhile, it is seen that Mawata Awayuki feels depressed over the death of her previous father, questioning the meaning of existence. She later encounters a trash demon that arises inside an alley. Sasame merges into Himeno, being able to defeat the trash demon.
3	"The Way of Becoming Prétear" "Tokimeki wo kikasete" (トキメキを聴かせて)	April 18, 2001
Hayate tests Himeno of her worthiness by her using a kendama, however she fails at the attempt and causes a disappointed Hayate to leave. Sasame later shows her how a kendama can help increase concentration skills. Go, after merging into her, trains Himeno to use fire powers in combat. Even when Hayate seems impressed after her training, he still shows hostility towards her, causing her to accidentally say that she does not need him anymore. Himeno, after sensing a bicycle demon nearby, allows Go to merge into her and uses a fire ax to defeat the bicycle demon, thanks to Hayate.
4	"A Promise Made Under the Sunlight" "Youdamari no yakusoku" (陽だまりの約束)	April 25, 2001
Himeno is reluctant to find out that Hayate has been hired to work at the mansion. As a demon larva is sensed somewhere in the mansion, Mannen, Hajime and Shin alert Himeno about this. Mr. Tanaka allows himself to tag along in their search in the forest, but not to much help. The children get separated from Himeno, but they find her after she is chased by several animals. As a soil demon emerges from Himeno's garden, Himeno allows Hajime to merge into her. Himeno uses a water attack to destroy the soil demon.
5	"The Smile of Darkness" "Yami no bishou" (闇の微笑)	May 2, 2001
Takako mysteriously appears at a bridge in Himeno's dream. The next day at school, transport demons hover in the sky, absorbing leafe energy to be sent back to Takako. Himeno wanted to apologize to Hayate for disregarding his concern in guarding her, but she ends up being distracted by her father Kaoru Awayuki. Himeno, sensing a demon larva when a blackout occurs throughout the city, brings Hayate to the bridge where Takako soon appears. While Takako leads Hayate to a cathedral, an electric demon forms and attacks Himeno. The other Leafe Knights come to the rescue. Himeno allows Mannen to merge inside of her, and she shoots a blast of ice through the electric demon. Takako promises that she will kill Himeno the next time they meet.
6	"The Rouge Secret" "Ruuju no himitsu" (紅(ル−ジュ)の秘密)	May 9, 2001
Himeno waits for Hayate to return as she is reminded of what Takako plans to do to her. Kei gives her a good luck charm and Go serves her a dessert, both in effort to cheer her up. When Kaoru asks Mawata to make clay sculptures with him, she reminisces about when her previous father taught her how to sculpt. Mikage, the maid of the mansion, advises Himeno to address the cause of her worries. Himeno, desperate to know more about Takako, asks Mannen, Hajime and Shin to take her to where Takako was first imprisoned. When they return, Kei mentions that Takako was born as a human. A building demon soon appears, and Himeno allows Kei to merge into her. Himeno, before destroying the building demon, is then surprised to find out that Takako was formerly the Prétear before she decided to become the Fenrir.
7	"I Can't Protect Anyone Anymore" "Mou daremo mamorenai" (もう誰も守れない)	May 16, 2001
Takako, when she was the Prétear, fell in love with Hayate, who encouraged her to get stronger, though she endured much fear in battle. However, as Hayate was unable to return that love, she became the Fenrir, which urged the Leafe Knights to seal her away in imprisonment long ago. Figuring out that the powers are based from emotions, being influenced either positively or negatively, Himeno never felt that being the Prétear was any of her business or being dragged into the cause. Instead, she says that the Leafe Knights should be in agreement in order to combine their powers together. The next day, Himeno tries to have a positive attitude despite injuring herself several times. Meanwhile, the Leafe Knights spot a few building demons lurking in separate areas of the city, yet they are seen as decoys. At the cathedral, Himeno is overwhelmed upon seeing Takako again, soon learning that she is unable to allow Hayate to merge into her.
8	"The Time of Awakening" "Mezame no toki" (目覚めのとき)	May 23, 2001
Takako drains all of Sasame's leafe energy before she disappears. While Go restores his leafe energy, Himeno returns home, blaming herself for what happened. While Himeno crosses a street, Mawata cries out her name before she almost gets hit by an oncoming car. The two head toward the beach, where Mawata mentions that living alone prevents any hurt and Himeno admits that she is clumsy and troublesome. Hayate reunites with Himeno at the beach, embracing her and worrying about her safety. Soon after, they encounter Takako, who has consumed the leafe energy of the remaining Leafe Knights. Believing in herself, she successfully allows Hayate to merge into her, which restores the leafe energy of the Leafe Knights. Himeno wounds Takako in battle, causing the latter to fall back.
9	"Unreachable Melody" "Todokanai merodii" (届かない旋律（メロディー）)	May 30, 2001
Mawata has been staying inside her bedroom ever since she witnessed Himeno and Hayate hugging each other at the beach. Himeno senses the presence of Takako somewhere in the mansion, and the Leafe Knights split up to go search after her. Her family, as well as Yayoi Takato, believe that a ghost is hiding, so they go on a hunt, but not to much luck. Himeno ponders how Hayate feels about her. Mawata tells Mikage about her previous father, whom she had felt most connected to before he died. Mikage then advises her to accept her feelings and be honest with herself to others. Sasame, after realizing that Mikage is actually Takako, not only confesses his love for her, but also chooses to side with her.
10	"At the End of Memories" "Omoi no hate ni" (想いの果てに)	June 6, 2001
Takako rejects Sasame's feelings for her before she disappears. While Mannen, Hajime and Shin help build a house for Himeno, Hayate tells her to return to the mansion to bid farewell to her family. Takako, setting Mawata in a trance, tries to absorb the hatred from her heart, yet Mawata is still tied to her affection for Sasame. Takako commands Sasame, who has destroyed the house, to assassinate Hayate in order to win her over, though Sasame seems hesitant. Takako allows Hayate to live and gives Sasame the power of darkness.
11	"Eyes of Glass" "Garasu no hitomi" (ガラスの瞳)	June 13, 2001
Sasame still wants to be with Takako, despite her planning to destroy all of the leafe energy. Hayate apologizes to Himeno for giving her the responsibility of becoming the Prétear. Mawata, having mixed feelings, is soon visited by Sasame, who has come to take her away. Meanwhile, Himeno allows Hayate to merge into her, using a wind sword to defeat demon larvae that were approaching the mansion. Mawata, rejecting Natsue Awayuki to have cherished her as a daughter, says that she has felt alone until her first encounter with Sasame. However, after Takako kisses Sasame in front of Mawata, Takako reaches into her heart again, in which this time she becomes the nucleus of the Great Tree of Fenrir that has grown.
12	"Warmth, Once More" "Mekumori wo mouichido" (ぬくもりをもう一度)	June 20, 2001
Kaoru and Natsune arrive with Mayune Awayuki, who is eager to save her little sister. Himeno, along with the three, try their best to break Mawata free from the Great Tree of Fenrir, striving to never give up. Mannen, Hajime and Shin help evacuate the city, while Kei and Go fend off lurking demon larvae. Sasame interjects and tells Himeno that she was absentminded of how much pain that Mawata has suffered all this time. Hayate decides to part from Himeno and take on Sasame by himself. Himeno climbs to the top of the tree and confronts Takako to be willing to forgive the betrayal and forget the past. Himeno manages to past through the barrier and convinces Mawata to release her hatred, thereby freeing herself. As Sasame defeats Hayate, he hesitates when Takako orders him to kill Himeno. When Takako prepares to kill herself via the vines and roots of the tree, Sasame shields her from the attack.
13	"The Legend of White Snow" "Shiroi yuki no densetsu" (白い雪の伝説)	June 27, 2001
Takako, after weeping tearfully as Sasame begins to die, becomes engulfed in the Great Tree of Fenrir, wreaking havoc in the city. Himeno allows Hayate to merge into her in order to save Takako. The other Leafe Knights then give up their leafe energy in an attempt to strengthen Himeno. Hayate, as Himeno is being attacked by the vines and roots, shields her from getting hurt, greatly weakening him. She then transforms into the White Prétear and releases a lot of leafe energy, rescuing Takako and reviving Sasame as white snow falls from the sky, restoring the city. As Himeno gravely lies on the ground, Hayate kisses her, miraculously resurrecting her.
