= Gokudo the Adventurer =

Japanese light novel series

ゴクドーくん漫遊記 (Gokudō-kun Man'yūki)
- Genre: Action, Comedy, Supernatural, Fantasy
- Light novel
- Written by: Usagi Nakamura
- Illustrated by: Takeru Kirishima
- Published by: Kadokawa Shoten
- Imprint: Kadokawa Sneaker Bunko
- Original run: June 1, 1991 – September 1, 1999
- Volumes: 13
- Light novel

Gokudo-kun Man'yūki Gaiden
- Written by: Usagi Nakamura
- Illustrated by: Takeru Kirishima
- Published by: MediaWorks
- Imprint: Dengeki Bunko
- Original run: June 10, 1993 – June 2001
- Volumes: 10
- Manga
- Published by: Kadokawa Shoten
- Magazine: Dengeki Daioh
- Original run: 1995 – 2000
- Anime television series
- Directed by: Kunihisa Sugishima
- Written by: Atsuhiro Tomioka
- Studio: Trans Arts
- Licensed by: Enoki Films; Media Blasters (expired); Discotek Media (sub-licensed)
- Original network: TV Tokyo
- Original run: April 2, 1999 – September 24, 1999
- Episodes: 26

Gokudo-kun the Adventurer (ゴクドーくん漫遊記, Gokudō-kun Man'yūki) is a Japanese light novel series written by Usagi Nakamura and illustrated by Takeru Kirishima. The light novel was first serialized by Kadokawa Shoten in their light novel magazine Kadokawa Sneaker Bunko. It was later adapted into a manga in 1995 and released in Dengeki Daioh magazine. An anime adaptation was produced by Trans Arts and aired on TV Tokyo from 2 April 1999 to 24 September 1999, with a total of 26 episodes.

Enoki Films holds the United States anime license under the name Jester the Adventurer. In 2001, AnimeWorks translated and released the anime on DVD as simply Gokudo. On 18 July 2016, Discotek Media announced it had licensed the anime from Enoki Films. A DVD collection was released on 27 September later that year.

== Story ==
The story focuses on an adventurer named Gokudo. Unlike most protagonists he is an antihero, willing to resort to violence to fulfill his agenda. He does not hesitate to abuse the needs of people, sell out his friends to save himself, run away from any dangers, or ditch others who helped him if he does not have any more interest in them. His life starts to change when he finds a magical Genie named Djinn who wants to grant him three wishes. While people would benefit from having three wishes, in his case it leads him to a lot of trouble, and it doesn't take long before he tries to escape from Djinn, and every other person he meets.

Other important characters are the Old Seer (or the Queen of the Magic World), who constantly appears out of nowhere, seemingly only to make Gokudo suffer more; Rubette La Lette, a noble girl with a tomboy attitude who sees Gokudo as a rival; and Prince (called Niari by the Old Seer), a mage much better at handling women than Gokudo will ever be.

== Characters ==
- Gokudo Yuccot Kikansky (ゴクドー・ユーコット・キカンスキー, Gokudō Yūkotto Kikansukī) is the main character of the series. He is not the stereotypical hero, but more of an anti-hero. Gokudo is rude, cowardly and lazy. He would only go on quest just for his personal gain and he is known for skipping out on paying for food, stealing, and ripping people off their gold whenever he sees fit. Next to that he's always the first person to turn tail during a dangerous situation. He is voiced by Akira Ishida in the Japanese version and by Daniel Kevin Harrison in the English dub.
- Rubette La Lette (ルーベット・ラ・レェテ, Rūbetto Ra Reete) is a supporting character that appears near the end of the first episode in the anime and joins Gokudo near the end of the second. She has a tomboy attitude and comes from a noble family. She is quite adept at using ranged weapons and is mostly seen wielding a magic bow she received from the old seer. She is also seen to be a lousy singer. Her voice is done by Sayuri Yoshida in Japanese and Debora Rabbai in English.
- Djinn is a genie that Gokudo acquired by stealing a small money bag from the old seer in which Djinn was contained in the form of a stone. After promising Gokudo three wishes, Djin gave him a long winded lecture about how Money, fame and girls are not responsible wishes. After this, instead of fulfilling Gokudo's wishes, Djin stayed by his side in order to teach him more about responsibility. Djinn is a very upbeat character who always lectures people (mostly Gokudo) about responsibility, though he himself is prone to getting drunk and partaking in other activities that lead Gokudo into trouble. In the Japanese version, Djinn is voiced by Yutaka Shimaka in his male form and by Mami Kingetsu in his female form. In the English dub, he is voiced by Greg Wolfe as a male and first by Stacie Lynn Renna in episodes 1–2 and for the rest of the series by Jessica Calvello as a female.
- Granny is the name Gokudo often uses to address the Seer/Queen of the Magic World. She is the first character to show up in the anime series, when she warns Gokudo about his life being in danger. Instead of listening to her, Gokudo scams the old woman into paying his bills and makes off with her money bag. Following this first encounter Granny often appears again, sometimes to help out Gokudo and the gang but usually she causes them to get into more trouble in the end. She is voiced by Junko Hori in the Japanese version and by Sonny Weil in the dub.
- Prince Niari, is the Prince of the Magic World. This makes Granny his mother. Prince has a very outgoing personality, flirting with every pretty girl he finds on his way. Next to that, he's also very vain. He has the habit of using giant robots during battles. After losing his first fight against Gokudo, Granny stripped him of his powers and forced him to join Gokudo and Rubette on their travels. His Japanese voice is done by Shinichiro Miki and his English voice is supplied by Ted Lewis.
