= Sayuri Yoshida =

Japanese voice actress (born 1966)

- 吉田 小百合
- Born: March 25, 1966 (age 60); Tokyo, Japan
- Occupation: Voice actress
- Years active: 1990–present
- Agent: amuleto
- Website: Official profile

Sayuri Yoshida (吉田 小百合, Yoshida Sayuri) (born on March 25, 1966) is a Japanese voice actress who is best known for voicing Himeno Awayuki in Prétear and Inaba Mizuki in Full Metal Panic!. She also voiced Rubette la Lette in Gokudo and recorded on the Macross Generation series of albums.

== Filmography ==
=== Anime ===
Year	Series	Role	Notes	Source
1996–2005	Case Closed	Guest characters		
1997	Class Reunion: Yesterday Once More	Ayu Wakabayashi, Mizuho Kobayakawa	OAV	
1998	Nazca	Miyuki Miura, Maiden		
1998	Only You: Viva! Cabaret Club	Sarina		
1999	Pet Shop of Horrors	Girl		
1999	Gokudo	Rubette la Lette		
1999	Cyborg Kuro-chan	Juliet, Megumi, others		
2001	Angelic Layer	Rin Jonouchi		
2001	Prétear	Himeno Awayuki		
2001	Cosmic Baton Girl Comet-san	Rabapyon		
2001	Samurai Girl: Real Bout High School	Tamaki Nakamura		
2001	Najica Blitz Tactics	Semere		
2001	Kirby of the Stars	Fūmu, others		
2002	Full Metal Panic!	Mizuki Inaba		
2002	Atashin'chi	Various characters		
2002	Princess Tutu	Rätsel		
2002	Weiß kreuz Glühen	Misaki Kodama		
2003	Full Metal Panic? Fumoffu	Mizuki Inaba		
2003	F-Zero: GP Legend	Miss Killer, Haruka Misaki		
2004	tactics	Ayame Minamoto		
2005	Doraemon	Woman		
2005	Doraemon	Various characters		
2005	Full Metal Panic! The Second Raid	Mizuki Inaba		
2006	Kirarin Revolution	Akane Minami		
2008, 2014	Nintama Rantarō	Heita Shimosakabe, various characters		
2008–15	Crayon Shin-chan	Various characters		
2009	Gokujō!! Mecha Mote Iinchō	Damian		
2010	Stitch! ~Best Friends Forever~	Noro		
2012	The Knight in the Area	Miami Ace		
2012	Gon	Konga		

=== Video games ===
Year	Series	Role	Notes	Source
	Ren'ai Kouhosei	Lynn	Windows	
2006	MÄR: Klavier of Oblivion	Flat A		
2007	The Familiar of Zero: Symphony of the Spinning Night Wind			
2009	Hexyz Force	Ralu		

=== Drama CDs ===
Series	Role	Notes	Source
Macross Generation	Riser		
Tactics love letter sweet trap	Ayame		

=== Dubbing ===
- Paw Patrol (Yumi)
