= Hideki Chiba =

Japanese baseball player (born 1983)

Hideki Chiba (born October 25, 1983) is a former baseball player based in Japan. He played for the Yokohama Bay Stars in the Central League during the 2002 season, posting a 3.38 ERA in eight innings pitched.
