= Japanese holdout =

Soldiers who kept fighting post-WWII

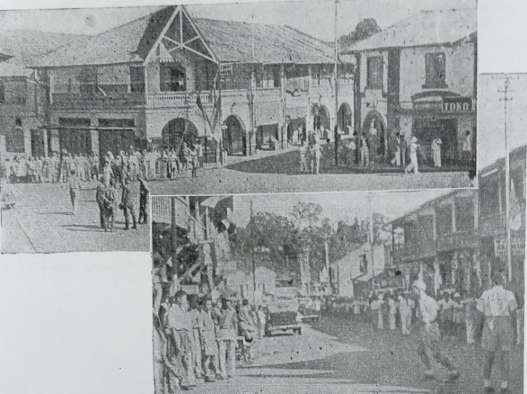
Japanese holdout soldiers still occupying the city of Bukittinggi, after the surrender of Japan and the Proclamation of Indonesian Independence

Japanese holdouts (Japanese: 残留日本兵, romanized: zanryū nipponhei, lit. 'remaining Japanese soldiers') were soldiers of the Imperial Japanese Army (IJA) and Imperial Japanese Navy (IJN) in the Pacific Theatre of World War II who continued fighting after the surrender of Japan at the end of the war for a variety of reasons. Japanese holdouts either doubted that Japan had surrendered, were not aware that the war had ended because communications had been cut off by Allied advances, feared they would be executed if they surrendered to Allied forces, or felt bound by honor and loyalty never to surrender.

After Japan officially surrendered on 2 September 1945, Japanese holdouts in Southeast Asia and the Pacific islands that had been part of the Japanese Empire continued to fight local police, government forces, and Allied troops stationed to assist the newly formed governments. For nearly 30 years after the end of the war, dozens of holdouts were discovered in the jungles of Southeast Asia and the Pacific, with the last verified holdout, Private Teruo Nakamura, surrendering on the island of Morotai in 1974.

== History ==
=== Individuals ===
Person	Date found	Duration since WWII end	Location	Short summary
Yamakage Kufuku	January 6, 1949	3 years, 130 days	Iwo Jima	Yamakage Kufuku and Matsudo Linsoki, two Imperial Japanese Navy machine gunners, surrendered on Iwo Jima. While the original news article did not correctly report their names, their correct names became known when they co-wrote a book in 1968 of their experiences under the names Rikio Matsudo (松戸利喜夫) and Kōfuku Yamakage (山蔭光福).
Matsudo Linsoki	January 6, 1949	3 years, 130 days	Iwo Jima	Yamakage Kufuku and Matsudo Linsoki, two Imperial Japanese Navy machine gunners, surrendered on Iwo Jima. While the original news article did not correctly report their names, their correct names became known when they co-wrote a book in 1968 of their experiences under the names Rikio Matsudo (松戸利喜夫) and Kōfuku Yamakage (山蔭光福).
Yūichi Akatsu	March 1950	4 years, 210 days	Lubang, Philippines	Private 1st Class Yūichi Akatsu continued to fight on Lubang Island in the Philippines from 1944 until surrendering in the village of Looc in March 1950.
Murata Susumu	1953	8 years, 120 days	Tinian, Mariana Islands	Murata Susumu, the last holdout on Tinian, was captured in 1953.
Shōichi Shimada (島田庄一)	May 1954	8 years, 271 days	Lubang, Philippines	Corporal Shōichi Shimada (島田庄一), who was holding out with Lt. Onoda, continued to fight on Lubang until he was killed in a clash with Filipino soldiers in May 1954.
Noboru Kinoshita	November 1955	10 years, 89 days	Luzon, Philippines	In November 1955, Seaman Noboru Kinoshita was captured in the Luzon jungle, but shortly afterwards committed suicide by hanging himself rather than "return to Japan in defeat".
Bunzō Minagawa	May 1960	14 years, 261 days	Guam	Private Bunzō Minagawa held out from 1944 until around mid-May 1960 on Guam.
Masashi Itō	May 23, 1960	14 years, 264 days	Guam	Sergeant Masashi Itō, Minagawa's superior, surrendered days later, May 23, 1960, on Guam.
Shōichi Yokoi	January 1972	26 years, 151 days	Guam	In January 1972, Sergeant Shoichi Yokoi, who served under Masashi Itō, was captured on Guam.
Kinshichi Kozuka	October 1972	27 years, 59 days	Philippines	In October 1972, Private 1st Class Kinshichi Kozuka, who had held out with Lt. Onoda for 28 years, was killed in a shootout with the Philippine police.
Hiroo Onoda	March 1974	28 years, 189 days	Lubang, Philippines	In March 1974, Lieutenant Hiroo Onoda surrendered on Lubang after holding out on the island from December 1944 with Akatsu, Shimada and Kozuka. Onoda refused to surrender until he was relieved of duty by his former commanding officer, Major Yoshimi Taniguchi, who was flown to Lubang to formally relieve Onoda.
Teruo Nakamura	December 18, 1974	29 years, 107 days	Morotai, Indonesia	Private Teruo Nakamura (Amis: Attun Palalin), an Amis aborigine from Taiwan and member of the Takasago Volunteers, was discovered by the Indonesian Air Force on Morotai, and surrendered to a search patrol on December 18, 1974. Nakamura, who spoke neither Japanese nor Chinese, was the last confirmed holdout.
Fumio Nakahara (中晴文夫)	January 1980	Not confirmed	Mount Halcon, Philippines	The Asahi Shimbun reported in January 1980 that Captain Fumio Nakahara (中晴文夫) was still holding out on Mount Halcon in the Philippines. A search team headed by his former comrade-in-arms Isao Miyazawa (宮沢功) believed they had found his hut. Miyazawa kept looking for Nakahara for many years. However, no evidence that Nakahara was still alive at the time was found.

=== Groups ===
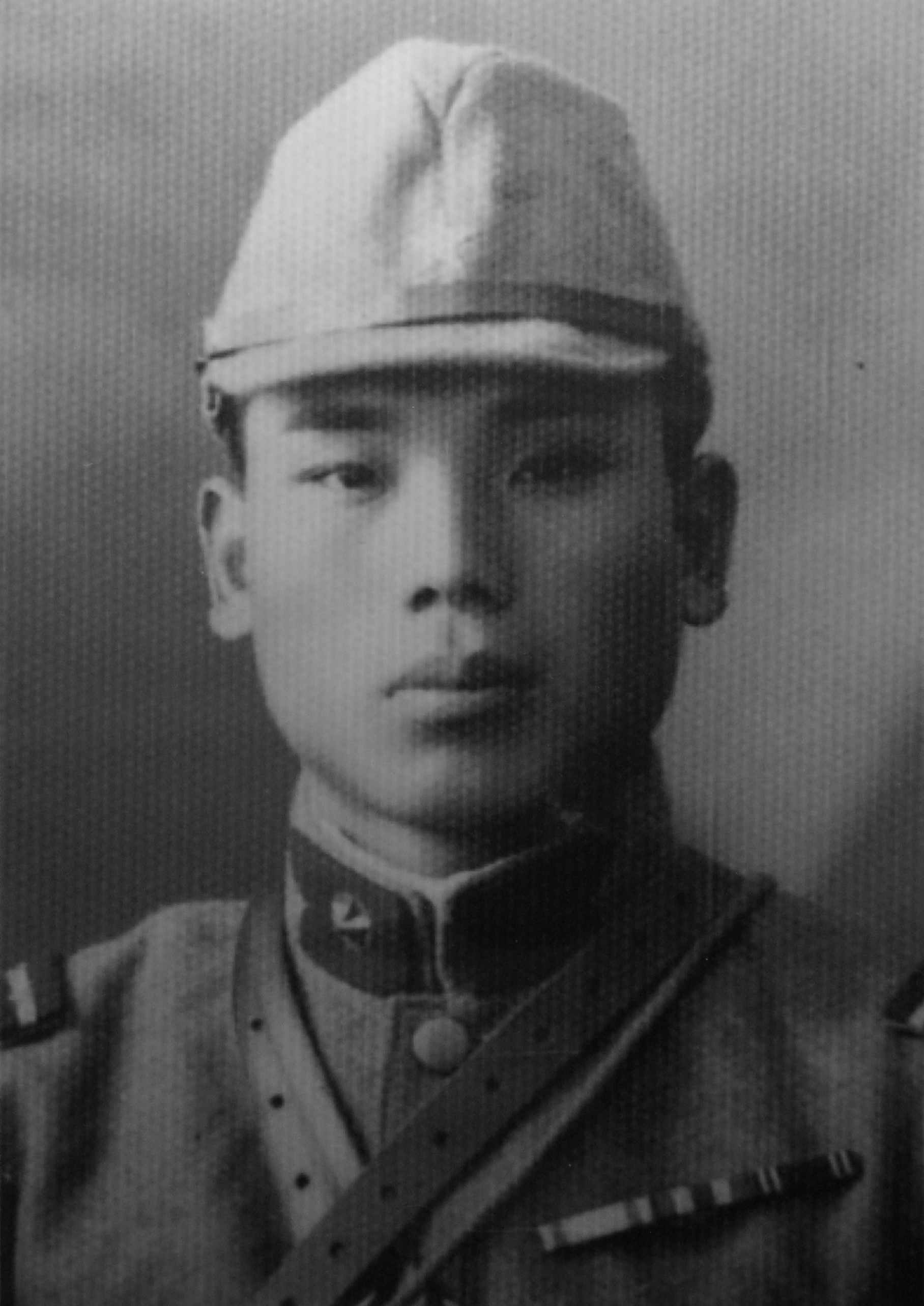
Second Lieutenant Sakae Ōba, a Japanese holdout, photo from 1937.

- Captain Sakae Ōba, who led his company of 46 men in guerrilla actions against United States troops following the Battle of Saipan, surrendered on December 1, 1945, three months after the war ended.
- On January 1, 1946, 20 Japanese Army personnel who had been hiding in a tunnel at Corregidor Island surrendered to a U.S. serviceman after learning the war had ended from a newspaper found while collecting water.
- Lieutenant Ei Yamaguchi and his 33 soldiers emerged on Peleliu in late March 1947, attacking the U.S. Marine Corps detachment stationed on the island believing the war was still being fought. Reinforcements were sent in, along with a Japanese admiral who was able to convince them that the war was over. They finally surrendered in April 1947.
- On May 12, 1948, the Associated Press reported that two unnamed Japanese soldiers had surrendered to civilian policemen in Guam the day before.
- On June 27, 1951, the Associated Press reported that a Japanese petty officer who surrendered on Anatahan Island in the Marianas two weeks before said that there were 18 other holdouts there. A U.S. Navy plane that flew over the island spotted 18 Japanese soldiers on a beach waving white flags. However, the Navy remained cautious, as the Japanese petty officer had warned that the soldiers were "well-armed and that some of them threatened to kill anyone who tried to give himself up. The leaders profess to believe that the war is still on." The Navy dispatched a seagoing tug, the Cocopa, to the island in hopes of picking up some or all of the soldiers without incident. After a formal surrender ceremony, all the men were retrieved. The Japanese occupation of the island inspired the 1953 Japanese film Anatahan and the 1998 novel Cage on the Sea.
- In 1955, four Japanese airmen surrendered at Hollandia in Dutch New Guinea: Shimada Kakuo, Shimokubo Kumao, Ojima Mamoru and Jaegashi Sanzo. They were the survivors of a bigger group.
- In 1956, nine soldiers were discovered and sent home from Indonesia's Morotai island.
- In November 1956, four men surrendered on the Philippines' island of Mindoro: Lieutenant Shigeichi Yamamoto and Corporals Unitaro Ishii, Masaji Izumida and Juhie Nakano.
- Several Japanese soldiers joined local Communist and insurgent groups to avoid surrender. For example, in 1956 and 1958, two Japanese soldiers returned to Japan after serving in China's People's Liberation Army. In 1989, two Japanese soldiers (Shigeyuki Hashimoto and Kiyoaki Tanaka) who had defected with a larger group to the Malayan Communist Party around 1945 laid down their arms along with the party, and returned to Japan in 1990.

=== Alleged sightings (1981–2005) ===
In 1981, a Diet of Japan committee mentioned newspaper reports that holdouts were still living in the forest on Vella Lavella in the Solomon Islands. However, it is believed that these were hoaxes made up to lure Japanese tourists to the islands. Searches for holdouts were conducted by the Japanese government on many Pacific islands throughout the 1980s, but the information was too scant to take any further action, and the searches ended by 1989. In 1992, it was reported that a few holdouts still lived on the island of Kolombangara, though subsequent searches were unable to find any evidence. An investigation into similar reports of holdouts on Guadalcanal in 2001 failed to turn up evidence.

The last report taken seriously by Japanese officials took place in May 2005, when two elderly men emerged from the jungle in the Philippines claiming to be ex-soldiers. It was initially assumed that the media attention scared the two men off as they disappeared and were not heard from again. Suspicions of a hoax or a kidnapping attempt later mounted as the area where the alleged soldiers emerged from is "notorious" for ransom kidnappings and attacks by Islamist separatists. It was reported by the Tokyo Shimbun on May 31, 2005, that unconfirmed information about remaining Japanese soldiers is said to be rampant in the Philippines. These reports are connected to scams tied to wealth, such as the alleged location of Yamashita's gold and M資金 (The M Fund). It is unknown how many or if any legitimate Japanese holdouts remain today, but after over eight decades since the end of the war, harsh jungle terrain, and equatorial climates, it is highly unlikely that any are still alive. The National WWII Museum reported in 2022 that surviving veterans are "dying quickly", as those who served are now "in their 90s or older".

== See also ==
- Resistance movement
- Resistance during World War II
- Volunteer Fighting Corps, planned Japanese resistance post-occupation
- First General Army (Japan)
- Shindo Renmei, Brazilian Japanese emigres refusing to believe Japan's surrender
- Werwolf, planned German resistance post-occupation
- Siege of Baler, Spanish soldiers in the Philippines who refused to believe the end of the Philippine Revolution and Spanish–American war
- Vladimir Šipčić, a Serbian Chetnik who fought until 1957
- András Toma, Hungarian World War II soldier who remained a de facto prisoner of war until 2000

=== Post World War II resistance ===
- Cursed soldiers, Polish post-World War II resistance fighters
- Forest Brothers, Baltic post-World War II resistance fighters
