= Samurai Girl: Real Bout High School =

Japanese light novel series and its adaptations

- Cover of the first novel of Samurai Girl: Real Bout High School as published by Fujimi Shobo

リアル バウト ハイ スクール (Shoukan Kyoushi Riaru Bauto Hai Sukūru)
- Genre: Martial arts
- Light novel
- Written by: Reiji Saiga
- Illustrated by: Sora Inoue
- Published by: Fujimi Shobo
- Imprint: Fujimi Fantasia Bunko
- Magazine: Dragon Magazine
- Original run: January 1997 – July 2010
- Volumes: 19
- Manga
- Written by: Reiji Saiga
- Illustrated by: Sora Inoue
- Published by: Fujimi Shobo
- English publisher: NA: Tokyopop
- Imprint: Kadokawa Comics Dragon Jr.
- Magazine: Monthly Comic Dragon
- Original run: December 1998 – April 2003
- Volumes: 6
- Anime television series

Real Bout High School
- Directed by: Shin-ichi Shoji
- Produced by: Takashi Watanabe; Hiroyuki Soeda; Masatoshi Kodaka
- Written by: Aya Matsui
- Music by: Takeshi Yasuda
- Studio: Gonzo; Digimation
- Licensed by: AUS: Madman Entertainment; NA: Tokyopop
- Original network: Kids Station
- English network: Anime Selects on Demand
- Original run: July 30, 2001 – October 22, 2001
- Episodes: 13

Samurai Girl: Real Bout High School (Japanese: 召喚教師リアルバウトハイスクール, Hepburn: Shoukan Kyoushi Riaru Bauto Hai Sukūru) is a Japanese light novel series written by Reiji Saiga and illustrated by Sora Inoue. It was serialized in Dragon Magazine from 1997 to 2010. A manga adaptation by the same authors was serialized in Monthly Comic Dragon from 1998 to 2001. A 13-episode anime television series was produced by Gonzo in 2001. It is set in a school called Daimon High, where disagreements among the student body are settled by martial arts matches called K-Fights. (The "K" stands for kenka, meaning "street fight".)

== Media ==
=== Light novels ===
The series in which both the manga, and the anime is based upon is the light novel series, written by Reiji Saiga. Original name is Shoukan Kyoushi Real bout High School (召喚教師リアルバウトハイスクール), and unlike the manga and anime, it centres around a teacher who works in Daimon high school. The main story line has 19 volumes, the EX line has five volumes, and the ED line has three volumes. However, the characters that appear in the novel are more or less identical to the manga and anime (with a few minor adjustments).

=== Manga ===
The story revolves around a school that doesn't break up fights, but rather, they grade them. The story introduces Ryoko Mitsurugi, Daimon High's Current reigning K-Fight Champion and self described Samurai Girl. It also introduces Shizuma Kusunagi, a traveling Street Fighter with mysterious powers. The manga, while comedic in the beginning, becomes more serious as Ryoko and Shizuma find themselves caught up in the machinations of several student councils and a criminal organization with Ryoko teaming up with a band of female fighters named after the historical Shinsengumi.

=== Anime ===
Ryoko Mitsurugi is the current K-Fight champion, whose skill at Kendo and her love for samurai dramas has led her to be known as the "Samurai Girl". One day, Ryoko finds a strange pendant which transports her to another dimension called Solvania, where she is expected to fight monsters. This is part of a bigger plot to revive Solvania the strong.

== Characters ==
Ryoko Mitsurugi

Voiced by: Ikue Kimura (Japanese); Wendee Lee (English)

A martial arts expert and Daimon High's current K-Fight champion. In Episode 1, it is revealed that Ryoko has an aunt named Madoka Mitsurugi. She seeks to learn the way of the sword, but is slightly self-conscious due to her height (she's 5'9" in the manga) and her samurai obsession. She is highly skilled in Kendo; only Tatsuya Shishikura, the captain of the kendo team, is able to beat her in formal kendo. Her rival is Azumi Kiribayashi, as she is a highly skilled fighter and is also in love with Tatsuya Shishikura. She also helps out the drama club with the school plays. In the manga her goals are different; she seeks to become a great woman by using the way of the sword and acts as a vigilante in the name of justice. Later on she becomes the leader of an all-female fighting group.

Shizuma Kusanagi

Voiced by: Tomokazu Seki (Japanese); Steve Blum (English)

A year ago, this young, tough ruffian was the K-Fight champion until Ryoko beat him. He has now returned for a rematch. He is a street fighter who practices kamui: a method that gives him fire-ki abilities. Besides his strength and use of flames, he had no martial arts training but uses self styled methods from years of street fighting with this combination of his own personal style and kamui no ken makes him one of the strongest martial artist in the school. Unlike Ryoko, he is not a member of any school club. So, in the manga, he created his own fan club. Although very cruel at times, he shows a soft spot towards Miyuki (the Hiten Shrine girl and Tessai's granddaughter), Sara (his personal fan), and sometimes even towards Ryoko, whom he admitted having romantic feelings for during their battle in volume 6 of the manga. Due to his family musical background, he is skilled with the guitar and piano he also rides a Motorcycle. In his childhood, he was taught kamui no ken by an old homeless-looking man named Ryugan Higishikata for everyday use. Shizuma turned it into a fighting technique. He was obviously modelled after Kyo Kusanagi and has his last name. In the manga, he is modeled after Donnie Yen. In volume 6 of the manga, he had nunchakus in his final fight with Ryoko.

Sara Himekawa

Voiced by: Megumi Kojima (Japanese); Colleen O'Shaughnessey (English)

Shizuma's friend with the blonde hair.

Hitomi Yuuki

Voiced by: Megumi Nasu (Japanese); Michelle Ruff (English)

Ryoko's best friend who wears glasses. She supports Ryoko in times of need. Although she attends a school that has K-Fights, she does not have any martial arts abilities. She is against fighting and wishes to discourage Ryoko from getting involved in school brawls. Hitomi is willing to endure a significant amount of physical discomfort in order to spend time with Ryoko. Including food poisoning, being kicked off her bed, and participating in exercise routines too intense for her.

Daisaku Kamiya

Voiced by: Kouki Miyata (Japanese); Joshua Seth (English)

Ryoko's number one fan. He is a stalker who follows Ryoko around with either a camera or a camcorder. He uses it to collect secret photos of Ryoko. Daisaku is also a close friend and supporter of Shizuma, and spends most of the series around him.

Azumi Kiribayashi

Voiced by: Satsuki Yukino (Japanese); Bridget Hoffman (English)

Azumi is a senior at Daimon High School and the head of the Flower Arrangement Club. Azumi likes to annoy Ryoko by being a rival for Tatsuya's affections. She uses a naginata as her primary weapon.

Tatsuya Shishikura

Voiced by: Susumu Chiba (Japanese); Tony Oliver (English)

Captain of the Kendo team. Ryoko and Azumi are fighting for his affections. He moves away in the middle of the manga (something that has not happened in the anime).

Takao Todo

Voiced by: Unshō Ishizuka (Japanese); Bob Papenbrook (English)

Daimon High's principal, an avid supporter of the K-Fight system and in the anime, former teacher to Nagumo.

Tamaki Nakamura

Voiced by: Sayuri Yoshida (Japanese); Julie Maddalena (English)

Daimon High School's fast talking K-fight announcer.

Shinsengumi In the manga, Ryoko teams up with a group of girls for some group fights.

- Megumi Momoi: Highly skilled Mixed martial artist and Grappler.
- Xiaoxing Huang: Chinese martial artist. Specializes in Binding. (Must Bind 300 opponents before she can return to her master)
- Asuka Kuronari: Specializes in Ninja Arts and Explosives. (While skilled in various ninja arts, she is only average in Martial arts skills)
- Aoi Asahina: Highly skilled martial artist and swordswoman. (Sword Skill could match or even exceed Ryoko)
- Midori Misato: Team Logistics and Communications Officer (Not a Fighter)

=== Introduced in the anime ===
Miyuki Onizuka

Voiced by: Sakura Nogawa (Japanese); Rebecca Forstadt (English)

A girl who resides at the Hiten Shrine. She has a small appearance in the manga.

Tessai Onizuka

Voiced by: Yuzuru Fujimoto (Japanese); Tony Pope (English)

Miyuki's grandfather and head of the Hiten Shrine. He teaches Ryoko the way of the sword, to be specific, the Hiten Style. He suggests Ryoko to keep using the bokken as it is two weapons in one.

Keichiro Nagumo

Voiced by: Juurouta Kosugi (Japanese); Jamieson Price (English)

(Anime Only) A mysterious fighter who created and championed the K-Fight system. Due to his travels overseas, he has fought against many martial artists. Like Shizuma, He possesses the fists of kamui. Only his technique, Shinken, uses energy based techniques. He is looking for the man who taught Shizuma. Later in the series, it is revealed that he and Willard Gates have had a long standing feud.

Reiha

Voiced by: Ryoka Yuzuki (Japanese); Dina Sherman (English)

(Anime Only) She is a war priestess that appears to Ryoko and the gang. She is from an alternate dimension called Solvania.

Miann Cubie

Voiced by: Kazuho Oda (Japanese); Mary Elizabeth McGlynn (English)

She works for Willard Gates and has an interest in Ryoko's fighting.

Willard Gates

Voiced by: Kenji Nomura (Japanese); Kirk Thornton (English)

The antagonist in the series. He and Nagumo have been long-time rivals.

== Movie adaptation attempt ==
In the early 2000s, Tokyopop had plans for a live-action version of Real Bout High School with Melissa Joan Hart.
