= Teruo Nakamura =

Japanese Army holdout (1919–1979)

- Born: Attun Palalin; 8 October 1919; Toran, Taitō Prefecture, Japanese Taiwan
- Died: 15 June 1979 (aged 59); Donghe, Taitung, Taiwan
- Military career
- Allegiance: Empire of Japan
- Branch: Imperial Japanese Army
- Service years: 1943–1974
- Rank: Private
- Unit: 4th Takasago Volunteer Unit 高砂義勇隊
- Conflicts: World War II; Battle of Morotai

Teruo Nakamura (中村 輝夫, Nakamura Teruo; Zhōngcūn Huīfū; born Attun Palalin; also known as Suniuo (史尼育唔) and by an adopted Chinese name Lee Kuang-hui (李光輝, Lǐ Guānghuī); 8 October 1919 – 15 June 1979) was an ethnically Taiwanese Aborigine soldier of the Imperial Japanese Army who fought for Japan in World War II and did not surrender until 1974, holding out in the island of Morotai. He was the last known Japanese holdout to surrender after the end of hostilities in 1945.

== Military service ==
Nakamura was born in Taiwan on 8 October 1919, when the island was under Japanese rule, and was an Amis Taiwanese aborigine. Western sources cite his birth name as being Attun Palalin although other sources claim his original name was Suniuo. He spoke his people's Amis language and had only trivial Japanese and Chinese language skills. He was married and had a son who was an infant when he left. He was given the Japanese name of Teruo Nakamura as a result of Japanization policies. In November 1943, he enlisted in a Takasago Volunteer Unit of the Imperial Japanese Army. Nakamura was stationed on Morotai Island, in the Dutch East Indies, shortly before the Allies overran that island in the September 1944 Battle of Morotai. Allegedly, the Imperial Japanese Army declared Nakamura dead on 13 November 1944.

After the Allies captured the island, it appears Nakamura remained there with other stragglers well into the 1950s, though setting off for extended periods on his own. He later recounted that at the end of the war, his personal property was limited to his uniform, helmet, rifle with under 20 rounds of ammunition, bayonet, aluminum mess kit, mirror, and a few other items. In 1956, apparently, he relinquished his allegiance with his fellow holdouts, and set off to construct a solitary camp consisting of a small hut in a 20 m × 30 m (66 ft × 98 ft) fenced field.

Nakamura proceeded to remain in his camp and survive by hunting, foraging, and farming until he was found. He grew sweet potatoes, bananas, beans, and sugarcane in his garden, foraged roots and fruits, trapped animals, and fished. Nakamura stated that his background of growing up in poverty in the mountains helped him survive. Unsure of the situation in the outside world, he stayed hidden, cooking only at night so the smoke wouldn't be seen. He assumed that the war wasn't over because he constantly saw planes flying overhead. He noticed that the planes got faster and sleeker over time and assumed it was due to an arms race. In fact, his camp was located near an Indonesian Air Force base and the improvements he saw were regular advances in aviation technology. As his clothing gradually deteriorated, he eventually went naked for most of the time, using a United States Army jacket he found to cover himself at night.

== Discovery ==
In 1974, after reports of a "naked wild man" living in the mountains surfaced, the Indonesian military mounted an expedition. He was found on 18 December 1974 and taken to Jakarta, where he was examined by doctors who declared him to be in good health, though he came down with a mild case of malaria shortly after.

News of Nakamura's discovery reached Japan on 27 December. Nakamura decided to be repatriated straight to Taiwan, bypassing Japan. As his wage arrears, Nakamura received 38,279 yen, which at the time was equal to a month's pay for a private in the Japan Self-Defense Forces. He also received 30,000 yen for "necessary expenses", so he could be repatriated to Taiwan.

Upon Nakamura's return, the Taiwanese press referred to him as "Lee Kuang-hui", a name he learned of only after his repatriation. Initially, the Republic of China government on Taiwan (under the rule of Kuomintang leader Chiang Kai-shek) did not receive him well, seeing him as a Japanese loyalist.

At the time, the Japanese public's perceptions of Nakamura and his repatriation differed considerably from those of earlier holdouts, such as Hiroo Onoda, who had been discovered only a few months earlier and was both an officer and ethnically Japanese. As a private in a colonial unit on foreign soil, Nakamura was not entitled to a pension due to a 1953 change in the law on pensions, and he thus received only the sum of ¥68,000. Following considerable outcry in the press, the government made an exception for Nakamura and offered him ¥3.5 million in total on top of ¥750,000 in public donations from Japanese citizens.

After his return to Taiwan, Nakamura found that his parents and all but two of his siblings were dead, with his surviving siblings now going by Chinese names, his son was now a father of four, and his wife had remarried. His wife's new husband was willing to separate from her and let the couple reunite but Nakamura declined the offer. He subsequently moved into an apartment close to where his ex-wife and her new husband lived.

Five years after his repatriation, on 15 June 1979, Nakamura died of lung cancer.

== See also ==
- Hiroo Onoda, among the last three Japanese holdouts to be found after the war; he was discovered in March 1974, Lubang Island, Philippines
- Shoichi Yokoi, among the last three Japanese holdouts to be found after the war, he was discovered in the jungles of Guam in 1972
