= Masashi Tazawa =

Japanese botanist

- Born: January 12, 1930 (age 96); Yokohama, Japan
- Citizenship: Japan
- Education: Osaka University, B.Sc. Faculty of Science 1953; Osaka University, Ph.D. Biology 1960
- Known for: Cell biology, plant physiology, biophysics
- Scientific career
- Fields: Cell biology, plant physiology, biophysics
- Workplaces: Osaka University; University of Tokyo

Masashi Tazawa (Japanese 田 沢 仁, Tazawa Masashi; born January 12, 1930, in Yokohama, Japan) is a botanist, notable for his physiological, biophysical and cell biological research on characean cells. He is a member of the Botanical Society of Japan, a corresponding member of the American Society of Plant Physiologists, and an honorary member of the German Botanical Society. Tazawa is also an honorary member of The Botanical Society of Japan and also an honorary member of the Japanese Society of the Plant Physiologists. In 1990. Tazawa received the Japan Academy Prize. In 1990/91 he was president of the Japanese Society of Plant Physiologists, and from 1976 to 1981, he was secretary of the Japanese Society of Cell Biology.

== Personal life ==
Tazawa married Keiko in 1955 and they have two children.

== Scientific life ==
On August 15, 1945, at noon, the 15 year-old Masashi Tazawa and the other students of the Preparatory Course of the Naval Payofficer's School assembled in the auditorium to hear the Emperor's voice, which happened for the first time in history. The Emperor told the people that he decided to accept the Potsdam Declaration issued on July 26, 1945. The students were forced to return to their homes. Tazawa's feeling at the moment of defeat was complex. He feared for the future of his nation, yet also felt that he was being saved from death in battle. Tazawa returned to the former middle school, and in 1947, he entered the Third High School in Kyoto, which offered two paths: liberal arts or science. Tazawa chose to take science without any serious consideration about a future job. In high school, Tazawa was a member of the rowing club, where the highlight was the eight boat race between the First High School in Tokyo and his school in Kyoto. He trained hard rowing in Lake Biwa in order to win the race. Exhausted from training, Tazawa often cut classes at school, which resulted in getting poor grades. After three years study in High School, Tazawa was forced to select a field for future study in the university. Tazawa wished to study either agricultural science or medical science, simply because the former might solve the food crisis under which the Japanese people suffered so much during the War and the latter was directly linked to the relief of the people. Tazawa chose to study biology, since biology constitutes the basis of both agricultural and medical sciences. Tazawa entered the Department of Biology in the Faculty of Science at Osaka University in 1950, at the age of 20.

The Biology Department of Osaka University was founded in 1949 to advance the new trends in biology, which was to base biological reasoning and experimentation on chemical and physical principles. The first chairman of the Biology Department, Professor Shiro Akabori, a distinguished protein biochemist, told the first undergraduate students at the entrance ceremony “Our new Biology Department places great emphasis on analyzing the biological phenomena on the basis of physics and chemistry.” Along this line, Akabori invited excellent biologists to be Professors in the new department. Noburō Kamiya, who was already well known and distinguished cell physiologist chaired the laboratory of cell physiology. Kazuo Okunuki, who discovered cytochrome c_{1}, chaired the laboratory of microbiology. Ichijiro Honjo, a forefront researcher in the field of sensory and behavioral physiology in animals, chaired the laboratory of comparative physiology. Hideo Kikkawa, who was well known for his discovery that the pigment found in Bombyx eggs is formed in the tryptophan - kynurenine–3-hydroxykynurenine pathway, chaired the laboratory of genetics. Professor Kikkawa proposed the so-called one gene-one enzyme hypothesis in 1941, of George Beadle and Edward Tatum.

During the World War II, almost no scientific information from abroad came to Japan. Professor Kamiya who had stayed in William Seifriz’s laboratory at the University of Pennsylvania from 1939 to 1942, and who revisited the USA in 1950 on the invitation of Seifriz told his students after his return to Osaka that biology in Japan was at least ten years behind that of USA. After the end of the War, Tazawa was very eager to catch up the level of the USA. At that time, many biology departments in old universities were divided into a Botany Department and a Zoology Department. In contrast, biology in Osaka, irrespective of whether the material was plant or animal, aimed at analyzing the biological phenomena on a cellular and physicochemical basis. The students named this approach based on fundamentals as opposed to the traditional approach based on taxon, “modern biology,” and they were proud of studying modern biology. In order to finish the undergraduate course and to get a bachelor's degree, Tazawa had to do research for one year. For this, he had to select the mentor. Tazawa thought that his talent might be suited to researches using physical means rather than chemical ones. Since the trend of research in Professor Kamiya's laboratory was physically oriented, Tazawa asked him to be his mentor. Tazawa studied at Osaka University with a bachelor's degree in 1953 from Noburō Kamiya.

Tazawa taught at Osaka University from 1955 as an instructor and received his doctorate in biology there in 1960. From 1955 to 1957, Tazawa studied under Erwin Bünning in Tübingen, Germany. In 1967 he was a guest lecturer at the FU Berlin (Institute for Plant Physiology). In 1968 he became assistant professor there and in 1977, he became professor of plant physiology at the University of Tokyo. Tazawa retired from the University of Tokyo in 1990 and then became a professor at the Fukui University of Technology until 2002. In 2022, Tazawa continues to do research on water movement.

== Research ==
Tazawa developed many techniques to study fundamental cellular processes (perfusion technology, the turgor balance to measure osmotic pressure, and methods of measuring plasma flow). He also investigated many membrane-related processes (water and ion transport, regulation of proton pumps, mechanisms of salt tolerance in plants, regulation of the turgor and osmotic processes, excitation processes on cells). The novel methods developed by Tazawa using characean cells made it possible to investigate fundamental cell biological processes.

=== Transcellular Osmosis and Polar Water Permeability ===
Using transcellular osmosis, Tazawa discovered that water movement through a single cell depended on the direction of water movement, indicating that there was an intrinsic polarity of the plasma membrane This work led to the first functional evidence for the existence of water channels in plant cells prior to the molecular identification of animal and plant aquaporins.

=== Turgor Regulation in Lamprothamnium, a Brackish Charophyte and Ca^{2+} ===
Tazawa found that the brackish water charophyte Lamprothamnium, which is exposed to daily fluctuations of the external osmotic pressure, regulates its turgor pressure by releasing K^{+} and Cl^{−} when the surrounding water is hypotonic. The release is regulated by Ca^{2+}.

=== Salt Tolerance and Ca^{2+} ===
Tazawa found that the fresh-water charophyte Nitellopsis obtusa can tolerate exposure to 100 mM NaCl when the medium is supplemented with 10 mM CaCl_{2}.

=== Cytoplasmic Streaming and Ca^{2+} ===
Tazawa developed cell models to study cytoplasmic streaming in characean cells. Using a cell model, he measured the motive force that results in cytoplasmic steaming. Using a cell model, he also showed that Ca^{2+} and phosphorylation regulated cytoplasmic streaming. According to Tazawa, Cytoplasmic streaming is one of the most beautiful and memorable processes that one can see under the microscope. If life can be defined, in part, by the ability to move in the absence of an exogenous force, then observing the rapid, rotational cytoplasmic streaming in characean internodal cells through a microscope is almost like seeing life itself.

=== Electrogenic H^{+} Pump ===
Tazawa showed that the extremely hyperpolarized membrane potential of Chara is due to an electrogenic H^{+} ATPase

=== Vacuolar Functions ===
Tazawa has shown that the vacuole is involved in pH regulation, and proteolysis.
