= Morotai Island Regency =

Regency in North Maluku, Indonesia

Morotai Island Regency Kabupaten Pulau Morotai
- Regency
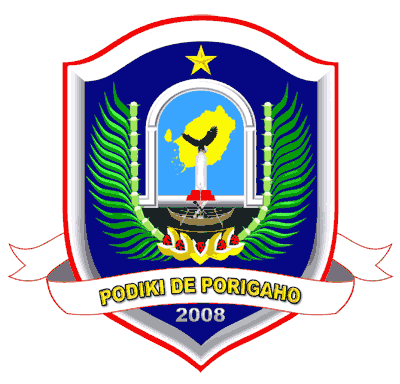
- Coat of arms
- Motto: Podiki De Porigaho (Let's Unite)
- Location within Maluku Islands

- Location within North Maluku and Indonesia Morotai Island Regency (Indonesia)
- Coordinates: 2°18′N 128°24′E
- Country: Indonesia
- Province: North Maluku
- Incorporated: 26 November 2008
- Capital: Daruba

Government
  - Regent: Rusli Sibua
  - Vice Regent: Rio Christian Pawane

Area
  - Total: 2,336.6 km^{2} (902.2 sq mi)

Population (mid 2023 estimate)
  - Total: 80,566
  - Density: 34.480/km^{2} (89.303/sq mi)
- Time zone: UTC+9 (IEST)
- Area code: (+62) 921
- Website: pulaumorotaikab.go.id

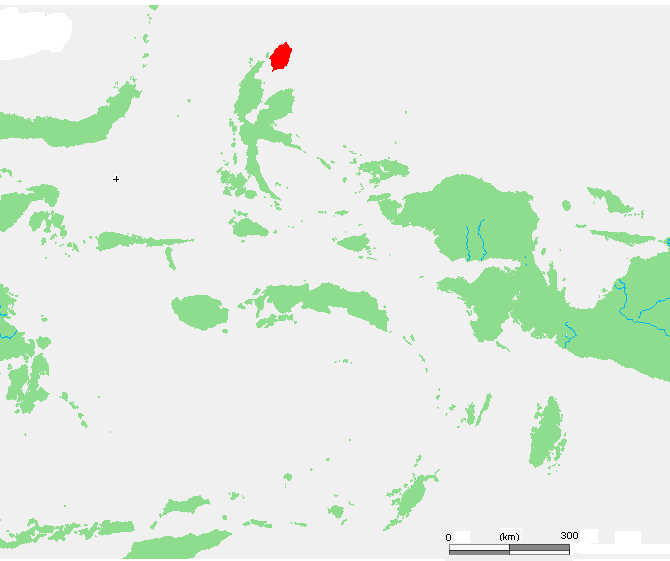
Morotai topography

Morotai Island Regency (Indonesian: Kabupaten Pulau Morotai) is a regency of North Maluku province, Indonesia, located on Morotai island (Indonesian: Pulau Morotai). It covers an area of 2,336.6 km^{2} including the smaller Rao Island to the west of Morotai. The population was 52,860 at the 2010 census and 74,436 at the 2020 census; the official estimate as of mid-2023 was 80,566 (comprising 41,461 males and 39,105 females). The population of the southern third of the island, as well as Rao Island, are Galela speakers, while that of the northern two-thirds are Tobalo speakers.

The island in the Halmahera group of eastern Indonesia's Maluku Islands (Moluccas); it is one of Indonesia's northernmost islands. Morotai is a rugged, forested island lying to the north of Halmahera. It has an area of some 2,336.6 km^{2} (902.2 sq mi), including Rao Island which lies to the west of Morotai and forms an administrative district within the regency. It stretches 80 km (50 mi) north-south and no more than 42 km (26 mi) wide. The island's largest town is Daruba, on the island's south coast. Leo Wattimena Airport is located on the island. Almost all of Morotai's numerous villages are coastal settlements; a paved road linking those on the east coast starts from Daruba and will eventually reach Berebere, the principal town on Morotai's east coast, 68 km (42 mi) from Daruba. Between Halmahera and the islets and reefs of the west coast of Morotai is the Morotai Strait, which is about 10 km (6.2 mi) wide. The island is the location of the last known Japanese holdout, Teruo Nakamura, who surrendered in 1974, almost 30 years after the end of hostilities in 1945.

== History ==
During the 15th and 16th centuries, Morotai was generally within the sphere of influence of the powerful sultanate on the island of Ternate. It was the core of a larger region, called Moro, that included the island and the coastline of Halmahera closest to Morotai to the south.

In the mid-16th century, the island was also the site of a Portuguese Jesuit mission. The Muslim states on Ternate and Halmahera resented the outpost for its evangelising activities, and managed to drive the mission from the island in 1571, as a part of a larger Portuguese retreat in the region. In the seventeenth century, Ternate further exerted its power over Morotai by repeatedly forcing major parts of the population to move off the island. Early in the century most of the population was moved to Dodinga, a small town in a strategic spot on Halmahera's west coast. Later, in 1627 and 1628, Sultan Hamzah of Ternate had much of the Christian population of the island moved to Malayu, on Ternate, where they could be more easily controlled. The Ternate Sultanate was a vassal of the Dutch East India Company by the end of the 17th century.

=== World War II ===
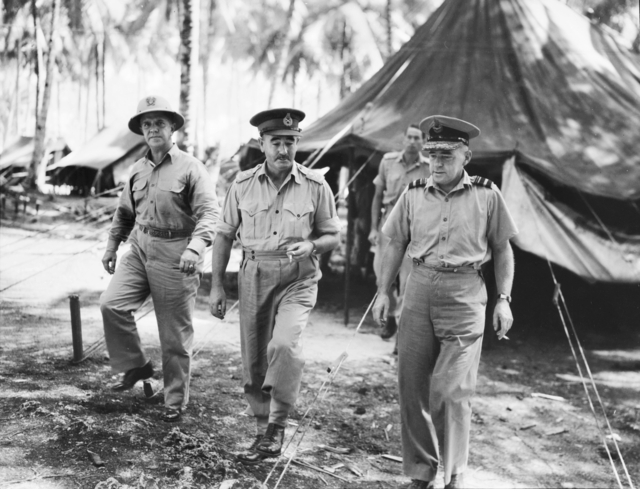
Australian forces at Morotai in 1945

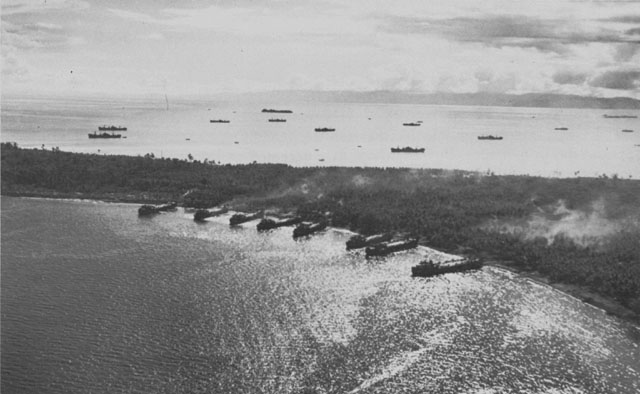
Beach on Morotai, North Halmahera

Morotai Island played a significant role in World War II. The island was captured by the Japanese in early 1942 as part of its Dutch East Indies campaign. Morotai's southern plain was taken by American forces in September 1944 during the Battle of Morotai, and used as a staging point for the Allied invasion of the Philippines in early 1945, and of Borneo in May and June of that year. Japanese soldier Teruo Nakamura was discovered in the Morotai jungle in 1974, as one of the WWII Japanese soldiers who held out subsequent to the Japanese military's surrender.

== Sumsum Island ==
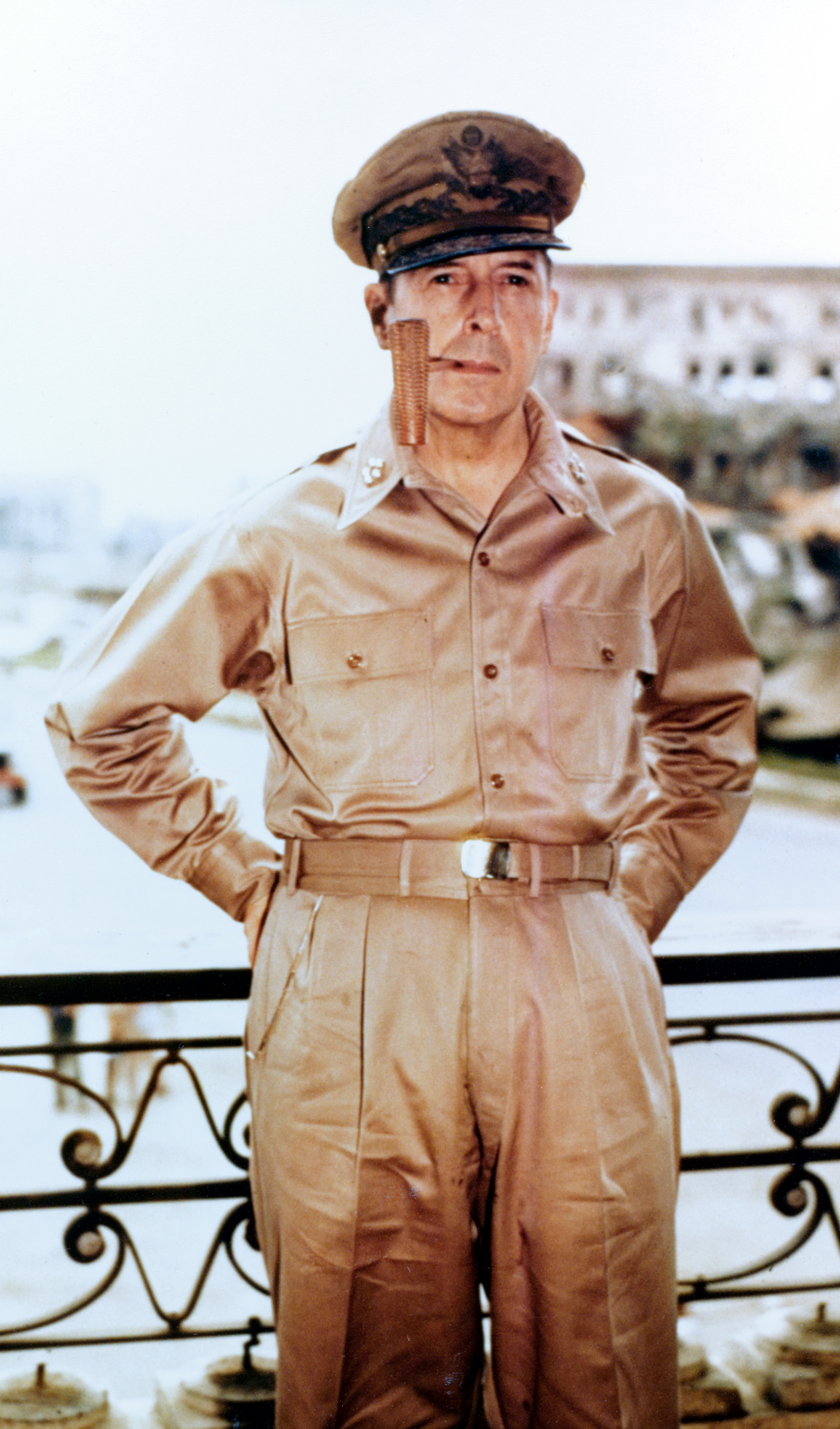
General Douglas MacArthur

Sumsum island, a small islet about 3 miles from Daruba town (the port of Morotai), is where General Douglas MacArthur, commander of the Allied Forces in the Asia Pacific region during World War II stayed prepared for an attack on the Philippines. There are bunkers that served as headquarters and the landing site of amphibious ships.

Morotai's southern plain was taken by Allied forces in September 1944 during the Battle of Morotai. In the latter part of 1944, 61,000 US Army personnel landed on Morotai. Two-thirds of them were engineers, who rapidly established facilities including harbours and two airstrips, plus extensive fuel stores. Mopping-up operations against small groups of Imperial Japanese forces on Morotai continued until the very end of the war.

The island was an important Allied base. The US Thirteenth Air Force and Australian First Tactical Air Force were based at Morotai and attacked Japanese in other parts of the Dutch East Indies and southern Philippines. The island was a forward base for US landings in the Philippines. In early 1945, Australian Army engineers expanded the base facilities at Morotai to support forthcoming Australian landings in Borneo. On 9 September 1945, Morotai was the site of a formal surrender by the Japanese 2nd Army. US and Australian use of the base was discontinued following the end of the war.

In 1974, the presence of the last confirmed Japanese holdout from the war, Private Teruo Nakamura (a member of the Amis people of Taiwan, known in his native language as Attun Palalin). Nakamura surrendered to an Indonesian Air Force search party on December 18 that year.

=== Permesta rebellion ===
The Dutch Empire withdrew in the Indonesian National Revolution in the late 1940s, after which the new Indonesian Air Force (AURI) kept one of the Allied-built airstrips in use. During the Permesta rebellion in 1958, AURI North American B-25 Mitchell bomber aircraft used the airstrip in transit on their way to attack the rebel center at Manado in North Sulawesi. Permesta had its own "Revolutionary Air Force", AUREV, whose aircraft, munitions and pilots were supplied by the CIA. AUREV aircraft attacked Morotai on April 21 and again early on April 26. The second air raid was immediately followed by an amphibious Permesta landing force that quickly captured the island. Within hours, a Douglas C-47 Skytrain transport aircraft landed on the now captured airstrip, carrying senior Permesta representative and two Americans. One was a USAF officer who inspected the runway and pronounced that Boeing B-29 Superfortress heavy bomber aircraft could use it.

In May 1958 Indonesian National Armed Forces started to gather amphibious forces to retake both Morotai and the rebel-held town of Jailolo on the neighboring island of Halmahera. By May 16 the assault fleet started to gather in Ambon harbour and on May 20 its troops landed on Morotai while élite Pasukan Gerak Tjepat (PGT or "Quick Reaction Force") troops parachuted onto the island. The Permesta force's surrender was as quick as its capture of the island less than a month before. It alarmed the Permesta rebels who had captured Jailolo, many of whom promptly fled back to North Sulawesi. Thereafter the rebellion was largely confined to the Minahasa Peninsula of Sulawesi, where Permesta remnants waged a guerilla campaign until the last unit surrendered in January 1962.

=== Post-independence ===
Morotai became its own regency on 29 October 2008, separating from the North Halmahera Regency.

=== Spaceport plan ===
After assessing three potential spaceport sites in 2012, the national space agency LAPAN announced Morotai Island as a future spaceport site. Planning started in December 2012. The launch site's completion is expected in 2025. In 2013, LAPAN planned to launch an RX-550 experimental satellite launcher from a location in Morotai to be decided. This island was selected according to the following criteria:

- Morotai Island's location near the equator, which makes launches more economical.
- The island has seven runways, one of them 2,400 meters, easily extended to 3,000 meters.
- The ease of building on Morotai, which is not densely populated, and little potential for social conflict with native inhabitants.
- Morotai Island's east side faces the Pacific Ocean directly, reducing downrange risks to other island populations.

== Geography ==
Morotai is a rugged, forested island lying to the north of Halmahera. It has an area of some 2,336.6 square kilometres (902.2 sq mi), including Rao Island off the west coast of Morotai. It stretches 80 kilometres (50 mi) north-south and no more than 42 kilometres (26 mi) wide. The regency's largest town is Daruba, on the island's south coast. Almost all of Morotai's numerous villages are coastal settlements; a paved road linking those on the east coast starts from Daruba and will eventually reach Bere-Bere, the principal town on Morotai's east coast, 68 kilometres (42 mi) from Daruba.

== Climate ==
Daruba, the main settlement and the seat of the regency has a tropical rainforest climate (Af) with moderate rainfall from August to October and heavy rainfall in the remaining months.

Climate data for Daruba
Month	Jan	Feb	Mar	Apr	May	Jun	Jul	Aug	Sep	Oct	Nov	Dec	Year
Mean daily maximum °C (°F)	30.0 (86.0)	30.0 (86.0)	29.9 (85.8)	31.1 (88.0)	30.6 (87.1)	30.3 (86.5)	29.8 (85.6)	30.8 (87.4)	31.1 (88.0)	31.5 (88.7)	31.4 (88.5)	30.5 (86.9)	30.6 (87.0)
Daily mean °C (°F)	26.3 (79.3)	26.3 (79.3)	26.2 (79.2)	27.2 (81.0)	26.8 (80.2)	26.6 (79.9)	26.1 (79.0)	26.9 (80.4)	27.1 (80.8)	27.4 (81.3)	27.5 (81.5)	26.8 (80.2)	26.8 (80.2)
Mean daily minimum °C (°F)	22.7 (72.9)	22.7 (72.9)	22.5 (72.5)	23.3 (73.9)	23.1 (73.6)	23.0 (73.4)	22.5 (72.5)	23.1 (73.6)	23.1 (73.6)	23.3 (73.9)	23.6 (74.5)	23.2 (73.8)	23.0 (73.4)
Average rainfall mm (inches)	207 (8.1)	182 (7.2)	208 (8.2)	205 (8.1)	217 (8.5)	202 (8.0)	138 (5.4)	122 (4.8)	113 (4.4)	104 (4.1)	168 (6.6)	177 (7.0)	2,043 (80.4)
Source: Climate-Data.org

== Administration ==
At the 2010 census, the regency was divided into five districts (kecamatan), but a sixth district has subsequently been added by cutting off Rao Island from Morotai Selatan Barat District. The districts are tabulated below with their areas and their populations at the 2010 census and 2020 census, together with the official estimates as of mid-2023. The table also includes the locations of the district administrative centres, the number of administrative villages (all rural desa) in each district, and the post codes.

Kode Wilayah	Name of District (kecamatan)	English name	Actual location	Area in km^{2}	Pop'n census 2010	Pop'n census 2020	Pop'n Estimate mid 2023	Admin centre	No. of villages	Post codes
82.07.01	Morotai Selatan	South Morotai	South Morotai	379.25	17,547	28,579	31,738	Daruba	25	97771
82.07.05	Morotai Timur	East Morotai	Southeast Morotai	342.01	7,779	10,846	11,837	Sangowa	15	97771: 97777
82.07.02	Morotai Selatan Barat	Southwest Morotai	West Morotai	557.12	11,078	9,053	9,630	Wayabula	15	97770
82.07.04	Morotai Utara	North Morotai	Northeast Morotai	478.31	9,226	11,560	12,064	Bere-Bere	14	97773
82.07.03	Morotai Jaya	Great Morotai	North Morotai	519.85	7,067	9,588	10,370	Sopi	14	97772
82.07.06	Pulau Rao	Rao Island	off west coast	60.06	^{(a)}	4,810	4,927	Leo-Leo Rao	5	97770
	Totals			2,336.60	52,860	74,436	80,566	Gotalamo	88	

Note: (a) the population in 2010 of Rao Island is included in the figure for Morotai Selatan Barat District, from which it was cut out.

== Economy ==
The island is heavily wooded and produces timber and resin and has a subsistence fishing industry.

== Energy ==
Currently 3MW Diesel generators across 3 locations one with 2MW, and 2 at 0.5MW. The electrification ratio is reported as 80%. Eight potential locations for micro-hydro were identified by ESDM/KKP.

== Morotai Aerodrome ==
The provincial government make an effort to turn Pitu Airport into an international aerodrome to boost tourists. 'Pitu' means seven due to they have seven lanes of take off and landing built in World War II. It has now been renamed Leo Wattimena Airport as a commercial airport.

== Notable people ==
- Melky Goeslaw, singer and father of Melly Goeslaw

== See also ==
- Battle of Morotai
- List of islands of Indonesia

== Bibliography ==
- Andaya, Leonard (1993). The world of Maluku: Eastern Indonesia in the early modern period. Honolulu: University of Hawaii Press.
- Conboy, Kenneth; Morrison, James (1999). Feet to the Fire CIA Covert Operations in Indonesia, 1957–1958. Annapolis: Naval Institute Press. ISBN 1-55750-193-9.
- Kahin, Audrey R; Kahin, George McT (1997) [1995]. Subversion as Foreign Policy The Secret Eisenhower and Dulles Debacle in Indonesia. Seattle and London: University of Washington Press. ISBN 0-295-97618-7.
- Villiers, John (1988). Las Yslas de Esperar en Dios: The Jesuit Mission in Moro 1546–1571. Modern Asian Studies 22(3):593-606.
