= Masashi Itō =

Imperial Japanese Army soldier

Masashi Itō (伊藤 正; 1921–2004) was a machine-gunner and sergeant in the Imperial Japanese Army during the Second World War. He was among the last holdouts to surrender after the war ended.

== War years and post-war survival ==
When the Americans recaptured Guam in July 1944, Itō was separated from his unit. He hid with two other soldiers and learned to survive in the jungle. For sixteen years, he hid even after finding leaflets declaring that the war had ended.

== Surrender ==
When the last of his companions, Bunzō Minagawa (皆川文蔵), was captured by woodsmen in 1960, Itō was convinced to surrender on 23 May 1960, after 14 years and 264 days of Japan's surrender in World War II and was treated at a nearby American military base.

== Later life ==
Itō married on January 7, 1961, and had a daughter. A movie was made about his life. He later worked as a watchman for the Toei Motion Picture Company in Tokyo. He wrote a book about his experiences entitled The Emperor's Last Soldiers, published in 1967.
