= Masashi Chikazawa =

Japanese baseball player (born 1982)

Masashi Chikazawa (近澤 昌志, Chikazawa Masashi; born June 26, 1982) is a former baseball player from Japan. Chikazawa played in the Japan Pacific League for the Osaka Kintetsu Buffaloes. He later played for Reno.
