= Masashi Kitamura =

Japanese voice actor

Masashi Kitamura 北村 允志
- Born: May 8, 1977 (age 48); Fukui Prefecture, Japan
- Occupation: Voice actor

Masashi Kitamura (北村 允志, Kitamura Masashi, born May 8, 1977 in Fukui Prefecture) is a Japanese voice actor who is affiliated with Office Kaoru. He has been voice-acting since the early 2000s.

== Personal life ==
Masashi enjoys swimming. He is a class C swimming instructor in addition to being a voice actor.

== Filmography ==
Major roles are highlighted in bold.

=== Anime television series ===
- **2007**
- **Yattokame Tanteidan** - **Detective Naoki Saginoya**
- **2014**
- Detective Conan - Seiya Kataoka

=== Anime OVA series ===
- **2010**
- Detective Conan: Magic File 4 - Osaka Okonomiyaki Odyssey - Student

=== Anime films ===
- **2007**
- Summer Days with Coo - Cop

=== Dubbing Work ===
==== Live Action Films ====
- A Glimpse of Hell - Additional Voices
- Anatomy 2 - Additional Voices
- Cherry Falls - Kenny Ascott (Gabriel Mann) (Home Video Dub)
- Freaky Friday - Additional Voices
- Watch the Shadows Dance - Pete 'Pearly' Gates (Doug Parkinson) (2002 Home Video Dub)
