= The Crossing (2014 film) =

2014 Chinese-Hong Kong film by John Woo

- Theatrical poster
- Traditional Chinese: 太平輪
- Simplified Chinese: 太平轮
- Literal meaning: Turbine steamer of peace and tranquility
- Hanyu Pinyin: Tàipíng lún
- Directed by: John Woo
- Written by: John Woo; Su Chao-pin; Chen Ching-hui; Wang Hui-ling
- Produced by: Terence Chang
- Starring: Zhang Ziyi; Takeshi Kaneshiro; Song Hye-kyo; Huang Xiaoming; Tong Dawei; Masami Nagasawa
- Cinematography: Zhao Fei
- Edited by: Ismael Gomez III; David Wu
- Music by: Taro Iwashiro
- Production companies: Beijing Gallop Horse Film; Le Vision Pictures; China Film Group Corporation; Huayi Brothers; Yoozoo Entertainment; Beijing Cultural & Creative Industry Investment Fund Management; Dongyang Mighty Allies Movie & Culture; Huace Pictures (Tianjin); Beijing Phenom Films; China Movie Channel; Galloping Horse Culture & Media; Lion Rock Productions
- Release dates: December 2, 2014 (Part I); July 30, 2015 (Part II)
- Running time: Part I: 128 minutes; Part II: 131 minutes
- Countries: China; Hong Kong
- Languages: Mandarin; Japanese
- Budget: US$48.6 million
- Box office: US$32.4 million (part 1)

The Crossing (Chinese: 太平轮) is a 2014–2015 epic historical romance-war drama (part 1) and disaster film (part 2) directed by John Woo and written by Hui-Ling Wang. The film stars Zhang Ziyi, Takeshi Kaneshiro, Song Hye-kyo, Huang Xiaoming, Tong Dawei and Masami Nagasawa. A Chinese-Hong Kong co-production, the film is based on the sinking of the Taiping in 1949. The incident led to the deaths of over 1,500 passengers and crew. The film's first part was released in China on December 2, 2014. Part two was released on July 30, 2015.

== Plot ==
Part I:

During World War II, Major general Lei Yifang (Huang Xiaoming) of the Chinese National Revolutionary Army in Manchuria personally leads a successful attack against Japanese forces over the objections of his subordinates. During the action, Dr. Yen Zekun (Takeshi Kaneshiro), an ethnic Chinese field medic conscripted into the Japanese army from Japanese Taiwan, is captured. Lei is promoted to lieutenant general, while Dr. Yen is shipped to a prison camp in Fengtian. On the POW train, Yen reads a letter from his Japanese paramour Masako (Masami Nagasawa).

A few years later during the resumption of the Chinese Civil War, Yu Zhen (Zhang Ziyi), a poor, illiterate young woman volunteers as an orderly at a Nationalist hospital in Shanghai. Her boyfriend Yang Tianhu is off fighting the Communists. General Lei catches the eye of wealthy debutante Zhou Yunfen (Song Hye-kyo) at a charity event put on by her parents, Zhou Zhongding and Yuan Shenglan. Despite her mother's warnings not to accept the attention of soldiers, she dances with Lei and they marry months later.

The next year, Yu Zhen meets signal corps sergeant Tong Daqing outside the photography studio Lei and Zhou used for their wedding. Sergeant Tong has hired Yu to fake a family photo to draw additional rations for his parents. A student anti-war protest outside the studio is violently dispersed and Dr. Yen enters, requesting separate photos of himself and Masako be altered so they appear to have been photographed together. Tong and Yu take refuge in a nearby shop. Tong explains his Republic of China Army service number which will identify him, dead or alive. Her smile convinces Tong she has feelings for him. Tong departs, telling Yu to memorize his unit number. Yu returns to the studio and orders a copy of the faked family picture with Tong and a stranger's baby.

Zhou, now pregnant, tells General Lei about her reservations about leaving for Taiwan and asks him not to see her off out of superstition. Zhou's parents are among the elite who see her and her sister off on the Taiping. Zhou's cousin takes her picture, capturing Lei in the background. He's come to secretly watch her departure before leaving for the front. Sergeant Tong's comrades pass around his 'family portrait' and admire his pretty 'wife'. Tong spins yarns about his fake family while the real Yu struggles to find work, eats discarded fruit and sleeps under a bridge.

Dr. Yen disembarks the Taiping with the Zhou sisters at the Port of Keelung in Taiwan, where Nationalist flags line the streets. He tells an official he was in Shanghai procuring medical supplies for his practice. The official asks where Yen, a native of Taiwan, learned the Guānhuà he is conversing in instead of the local language. Yen meets his brother and returns to his family home. His mother, a midwife, is burning letters sent to Yen by Masako. Zhou arrives at a Japanese-style estate, where she is welcomed by A-man, the Taiwanese maid, and writes a letter to her husband.

Yu lies about being married to get a room at a boardinghouse in Shanghai, using the fake family photo. A hometown acquaintance gets her work as a dancing girl at a club and reads aloud a letter from Yu's boyfriend, describing a battle four months ago. She declares that Yu's boyfriend may be dead and that romance won't keep her fed. They find the dance club shut down by the city government to conserve energy for the war effort. The unemployed dancing girls protest is met by baton-wielding police. Yu turns to prostitution to secure travel money to Taiwan, hopeing to find her missing lover.

Lei's 12th Army faces encirclement during the Huaihai Campaign and he orders a breakout towards Yongcheng. Angry at receiving countermanding orders, he confronts his commanding general who tells him similar breakout attacks have badly failed, likely due to their plans being betrayed to the People's Liberation Army. Sergeant Tong and General Lei bond over their family photos.

In Taiwan, Zhou discovers Masako's diary along with some original sheet music, revealing the house was once occupied by Masako. When she collapses in response to a snake bite, she is rushed to a doctor who Zhou recognizes as Yen from the painting Masako's diary was concealed behind. Zhou and Dr. Yen meet privately at a lighthouse. She shows him Masako's diary, and asks about Masako, wanting to use her sheet music to inspire a song for her husband Lei. Yen describes their meeting and how his mother and other Taiwanese disapproved of Masako as a colonizer.

The local populace feed the Communist soldiers while the Nationalist soldiers are starving. General Lei shoots his warhorse for meat. During a two-man patrol Sergeant Tong shoots a rabbit, gets confronted by a Communist soldier, and arranges a truce so the three of them can eat the rabbit.

The Communists blare propaganda to mask the sound of their sappers' tunneling. Lei sends Tong to make contact with the incommunicado 108th Division. Lei parleys with an old acquaintance, Communist general Liu Zhiqing who advises Lei to surrender. Tong discovers the 108th has defected to the Communists. When he returns to report, a fellow soldier who has secretly defected holds him at gunpoint but can't bring himself to shoot.

Lei finally receives the order to break out. When he gives his officers permission to leave him, they volunteer to remain with him. Tong reports to General Lei after the attack commences that the 108th has deserted. Lei convinces Tong to fight on but Communist troops overrun the Nationalist positions. Tong and Lei are injured by an exploding truck. When Lei asks Tong why he came back, Tong confesses about his fake family photo and expresses remorse for lying. Lei entrusts Tong with his diary and letters to his wife, then returns to his command post to look at his wedding photo. He is presumably killed when a tank shell hits the post.

Part II:

During the Chinese Communist Revolution in 1949, three couples fled from China to the island of Taiwan. The captain of their ship gets drunk, causing their vessel to collide with another ship. The ship took a sudden sinking within minutes, which caused a frantic scene until it sank completely. Zekun, having survived the initial sinking now uses his medical knowledge to help the injured ones afloat as the surviving fews are now fighting from the little furniture left from the now sunken ship. Yu Zhen, stating that she used to be a nurse, helps Zekun. Some selfish men try to steal the lifebuoys, even from the children. One of them stabs Zekun, who slowly dies, having a vision of his Japanese girlfriend who had taken her own life over grief earlier. He dies happily, rocking with the bottom. Yu Zhen is reunited with the injured Tong Daqing, and he loses the notebook that Lei Yifang had given him in the previous movie. Yu Zhen found it, and he reunited with the child and Yu Zhen. They eventually hold on to a piece of the ship until the sunrise comes when an Australian warship HMAS saves them along with some additional 31 survivors. 4 months passed, Zhou Yunfen gave birth to Lei Yifang's son but she doesn't know what has happened to her husband. Tong Daqing arrives at her house to tell her the bad news whilst telling her that he could bring Lei Yifang's diary thanks to Yu Zhen. Zhou Yunfen not only thanks Tong Daqing, but also Yu Zhen.

== Cast ==
- Zhang Ziyi as Yu Zhen
- Takeshi Kaneshiro as Yan Zenkun
- Song Hye-kyo as Zhou Yunfen
- Huang Xiaoming as Lei Yifang
- Tong Dawei as Tong Daqing
- Masami Nagasawa as Masako Shimura
- Qin Hailu
- Faye Yu
- Tony Yang
- Yang Kuei-mei
- Cong Shan
- Angeles Woo
- Yu Zhen
- Wang Qianyuan
- Bowie Lam
- Lin Mei-hsiu
- Jack Kao
- Denny Huang as Yang Tianhu
- Kou Chia-jui
- Xu Huanhuan
- You Yong
- Liu Yiwei
- Hitomi Kuroki
- Johnny Kou
- Fang Qingzhuo
- Bamboo Chen

== Production ==
Zhao Fei is the director of photography and Taro Iwashiro provided the scores for the film.

The film's original script was written by Wang Hui-ling, who had scripted films for Taiwanese director Ang Lee, such as Eat Drink Man Woman (1994), Crouching Tiger, Hidden Dragon (2000) and Lust, Caution (2007). A new script written by John Woo, and Taiwanese filmmakers Su Chao-pin and Chen Ching-hui was described as "considerably altered".

The filming began on The Crossing on July 6, 2013 in Beijing. Other shooting locations included Inner Mongolia, Shanghai, Taiwan and Tianjin.

== Release ==
The film was released in stereoscopic 3D. On September 9, 2014, Beijing Galloping Horse announced that the film would be released in two parts with the first part set to release in China on December 2, 2014.

The first official trailer for the film was released on September 22, 2014.

The Crossing opened at first-place at the China box office on December 2, 2014 which accounted for about 37.3% of all screenings in China grossing RMB24.0 million (US$3.91 million). The film was shown in 3-D and IMAX 3-D. The film was released in Hong Kong on December 25, 2014.

== See also ==
- Gone with the Wind (film), inspiration to the film as credited by John Woo
- Waterloo Bridge (1940 film)
- Titanic (1997 film), with Chinese-language film critiques and commentators comparing the two film's resemblance
- Chinese Civil War
- China–Taiwan relations
- Taiwan under Japanese rule
- Taiwanese Imperial Japan Serviceman
- Japanese immigrant villages in Taiwan
- Joint Security Area (film): South Korean film for which film critiques and commentators have compared their resemblance
- The Front Line (2011 film): South Korean film for which film critiques and commentators have compared their resemblance
