= Japanese opium policy in Taiwan (1895–1945) =

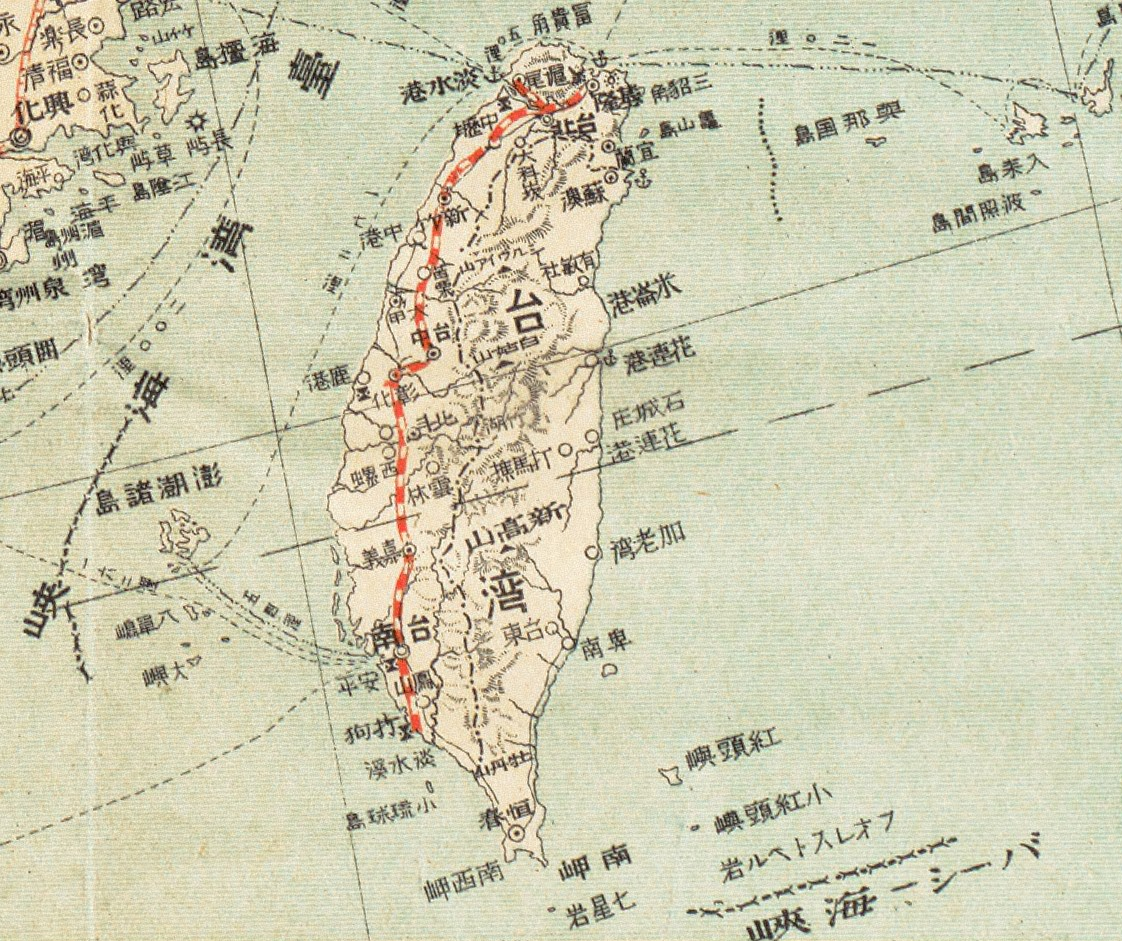
Taiwan map detail, from Qing Dynasty Map during Xinhai Revolution

Taiwan (also known as Formosa) is an island located off the coast of Fujian in mainland China. The Chinese and Taiwanese people have a long history together, with the first Han Chinese settlers arriving in Taiwan in the seventeenth century. The Japanese empire acquired Taiwan (also known as Formosa) following its cession from Qing dynasty China in the Treaty of Shimonoseki (1895) at the conclusion of the First Sino-Japanese War. This period of Japanese rule of Taiwan lasted until the surrender of Japan. During this period the colonial government of Japan initiated major policies to reduce the consumption of opium and opium derived products with much regarded success from contemporary sources both from the Japanese Colonial government and international sources.

There is a long history of opium use in Taiwan dating back to the arrival of the Han Chinese settlers in the 18th Century. The opium habit in Taiwan grew as a result of the Opium Wars in China, which inevitably led to the forced legalisation of opium in 1890. Between 1890 and 1891 the amount of legal opium imported into Taiwan increased from sixty kilos to four hundred thousand kilo. In 1892 alone the opium trade made up half of Taiwan's revenue sources, resulting in the widespread presence of opium throughout Taiwan.

== Opium ==
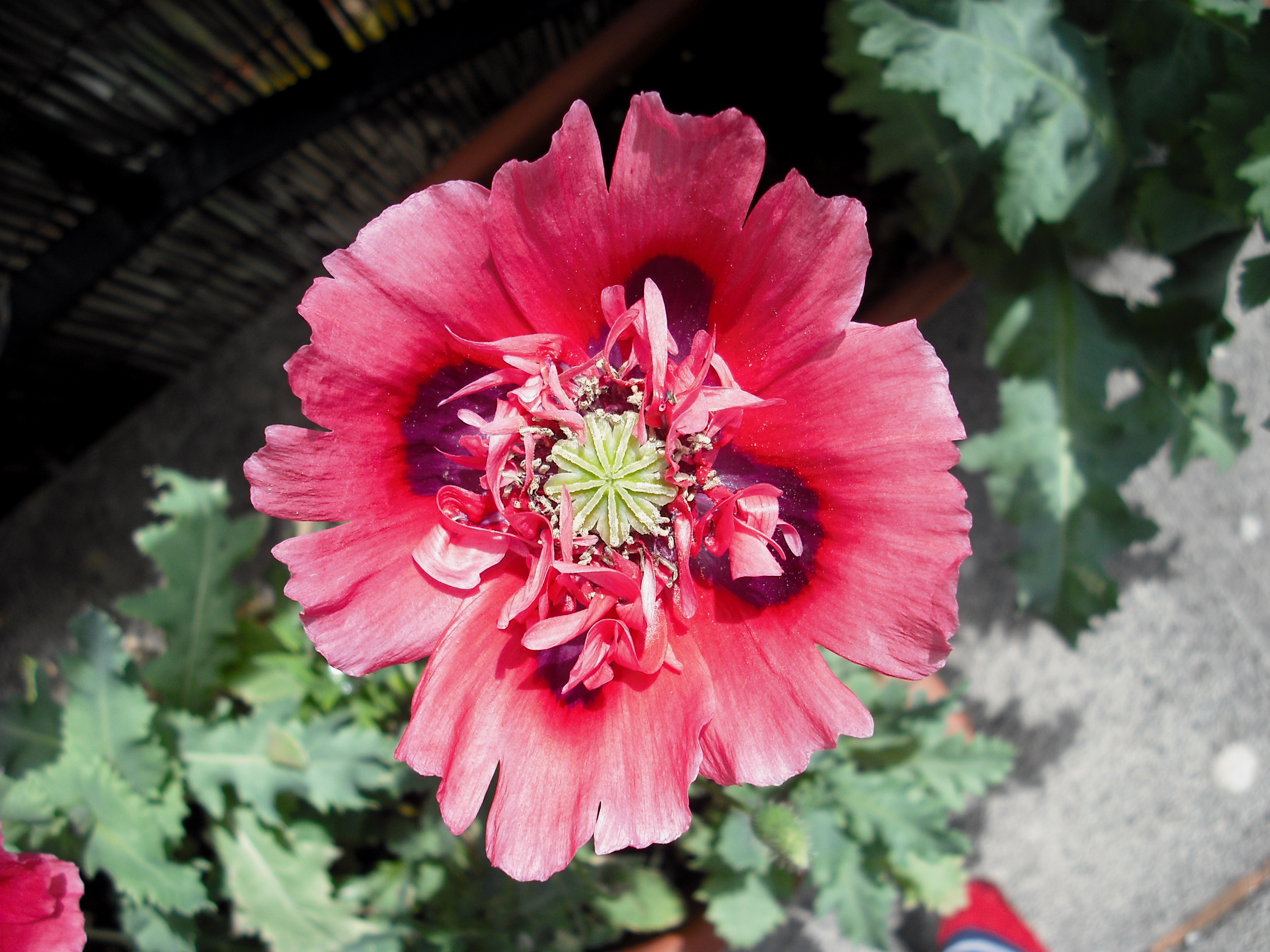
Opium Poppy

Opium is a highly addictive type of depressant drug which dates back to 3400BC. The opium poppy pods contain a milky substance called latex, which is made up of a number of chemicals such as morphine and codeine. The Latex from the pods is boiled and dried to become opium. Opium has been used throughout history recreationally and as medicine, with historians predicting that opium was likely introduced throughout East Asia in the sixth century A.D. along the Silk Road trade route. The First and Second Opium Wars of the 19th century between the British Empire and Qing Dynasty saw the continued spread of opium throughout East Asia. While opium presented the opportunity for a lucrative trading market to many countries, the devastating impact of the addictive substance caused havoc across East Asia as well as throughout the US and Europe.

== Japanese views on opium ==
The Meiji Japanese held a negative view of opium and regarded it as an uncivilized and lazy practice. These fears may have stemmed from their observation of its effects on the Chinese population as well as aggression from western powers to force its export.

These fears were exacerbated by American diplomats such as Townsend Harris that described opium as "the one great enemy of China" and that it "injures like the most deadly poison". The Meiji government strictly prohibited importation, possession and usage of opium except for medicinal purposes until 1868. Opium smoking in Japan was a rare occurrence and the punishment of the practice strict.

At the time Taiwan was ceded to Japan, opium smoking was regarded as one of the "Three vices" along with foot binding and the queue hairstyle that should be abolished. The Prime Minister at the negotiation of the Treaty of Shimonoseki, Itō Hirobumi expressed that "There have been people living in Taiwan long before the arrival of opium,” and that "The Japanese government will definitely prohibit opium after occupying Taiwan". However, there were fears that the practice may spread to Japan from Taiwan and also concerns that punishing opium usage could lead to anti-Japanese sentiment from Taiwanese locals.

Itō Hirobumi also expressed the contemporary Japanese view that that widespread opium usage was factor in Qing China's decline, stating "Opium smokers are rather lazy, and therefore soldiers cannot be at their best".

== Annexation of Taiwan from China ==
In 1894 the Sino-Japanese War began over Japan's invasion of Korea. The Qing dynasty was underprepared for the war and was overwhelmed by the power and force of the Japanese fleet. China was left humiliated by their defeat and in 1895 signed the Treaty of Shimonoseki which conceded Taiwan to Japanese rule in perpetuity. Taiwan was officially named Formosa under Japanese rule. The Taiwanese rebelled against the promise of Japanese rule and on 25 May 1895 established the ‘Republic of Formosa’. On 29 May over 12,000 Japanese troops arrived in Taiwan and begun disbanding the Taiwanese movement for independence. The 'Republic of Formosa was officially defeated in October 1895 and Japanese occupation of Taiwan commenced. The Japanese government viewed Taiwan as a resource for Japan's industries and saw an opportunity for a colonial market of Japanese goods and services which could improve the Japanese economy. The Japanese government's opium policies throughout 1895 to 1945 were highly controversial given Taiwan's long history with opium smoking. As well as the innate political and economic motivations of the Japanese government in interfering with the practice. Taiwan's long history with opium is strongly associated with Taiwan's close relationship with China throughout history.

== Formosa ==
Formosa was a Japanese colony for over 50 years, from 1895 to the end of WWII in 1945. During the first three years of Japan's colonial rule, the Japanese military governed the island. However, in 1898 Tōkyō began appointing Japanese governors to oversee Taiwan. As Taiwan was Japan's first colony, many resources were used to ensure the success of the colony Formosa. Japan had widespread success in establishing order throughout the colony by working to eradicate diseases as well as improve the colonies infrastructure and overall economy. Japanese rule modernised Taiwan following the ‘Meiji’ restoration processes. Their initial policies focused on growing the agricultural industry by working to improve production outputs and farming techniques. The Japanese also built highways and improved the existing infrastructure of railway tracks which aimed to increase access to isolated areas the island and stimulate the economy. Taiwan initially had 50 km of railway track when the Japanese first took control of the colony and worked to develop upwards of 500 km of railway tracks. The Japanese also constructed schools, hospitals and other key infrastructure such as roads, productive farms and trade ports. The Japanese government intended to propel Taiwan into a modern economy, and as a result became of the most advanced countries in East Asia.

Formosa experienced a shift in cultural identity as a result of Japanese rule. Although Formosa was not technically assimilated with Japanese culture, the local Taiwanese populations were forced to speak Japanese instead of their native languages, resulting in the loss of local culture. The Japanese ruled the Taiwanese people strictly, dictating policies which represented Japanese interests. A key aspect of the policies which were created to benefit Japanese interests at the time, involved control of the opium trade and strict regulation of its presence throughout Taiwanese and Japanese society. Japan's desire to "civilise" Formosa and the "savages" which occupied the land extended past infrastructure and education, and focused largely on opium usage. The practise of smoking opium was seen as primitive and dangerous by the Japanese hick as a threat to their ideology and their perception in the global world.

== Taiwan Opium Edict of 1897 ==
In 1895 the short-lived 'Republic of Formosa' resistance leaders created fake 'Japanese issued propaganda' stating that opium would be banned in the hope it would drive supporters to their cause. In response, the Japanese government made it temporarily legal to continue smoking opium for the local Taiwanese residents, while stating it was punishable by death to supply opium to any Japanese individual. After the Republic of Formosa was defeated, the Japanese government took great issue with the prevalence of opium through Taiwan, fearing it would spread to Japan if not monitored correctly.

On 21 January 1897 the Japanese government issued the Taiwan Opium Edict which established a new opium policy for Taiwan. The Edict outlined the Japanese government's monopoly over the trade of opium and the restricted sale of the drug to "proven addicts" with the necessary licences. The process of 'Licensed opium usage' took three years to complete and resulted in just under 200,000 licences. Japan's opium policy was conducted under the administration and leadership of the East Asia Development Board (Kōain) in operation from December 1938 to November 1942. The policy meant Taiwanese nationals who already addicted to opium could continue to smoke under government regulation. However, by the 1920s there were as many unregistered opium users as registered opium users. The imbalance between the number of registered and unregistered opium smokers demonstrated that the policy was ineffective at keeping nonusers from taking up smoking. Opium dens were common place throughout Southeast Asia. They were establishments where opium was sold and smoked and were frequented by locals and foreigners who were looking to access opium.

== Opium trade as a revenue source and the eventual eradication of opium smoking ==
The 'Opium Edict' is viewed by some historians as the initial demonstration by the Japanese government of their intentions to profit from the opium trade. The government was in the process of making the opium trade a monopoly for their individual gain, whilst simultaneously developing policies which permitted users to continue smoking and prohibited people from starting to smoke. In 1896, 1 year after the Japanese began establishing a monopoly, opium revenue made up 60% of Taiwan's total yearly revenue, which continued to grow throughout the 1900s, until opium smoking was effectively eradicated by the end of the Japanese era. The monopoly initially led to an increase in revenue achieved by inflated prices of opium and an overall decrease of smokers. The outcome of the Opium Edict suggests that the Opium policy had a twofold function, in that, revenue was needed to fund Japan's occupation of Formosa and that controlling opium usage in Taiwan was a direct method of controlling the population.

Nevertheless, the Japanese colonial government implemented a program of opium eradication. In 1930 it established the Government Center Hospital for Opium Addicts. Professor Tsungming Tu, the first Taiwanese to earn a medical doctorate, was appointed as its head. He devised a method for testing the presence of opium in patients' urine and a treatment method based on the substitution of opium with decreasing dosage of morphine. By the time Taiwan reverted to Chinese control in 1945, the number of opium smokers in Taiwan had become negligible. The eradication of opium smoking was seen as one of the most significant medical accomplishments during the Japanese colonial era.
