= New People Society =

The New Peoples' Society (Chinese: 新民會; Pinyin: Xīnmín huì) was established on 11 January 1920. It was the first organization for political movement, created by Taiwanese students in Japan during the Japanese rule of Taiwan.
