= Taiping (steamer) =

Chinese steamer, sank in 1949

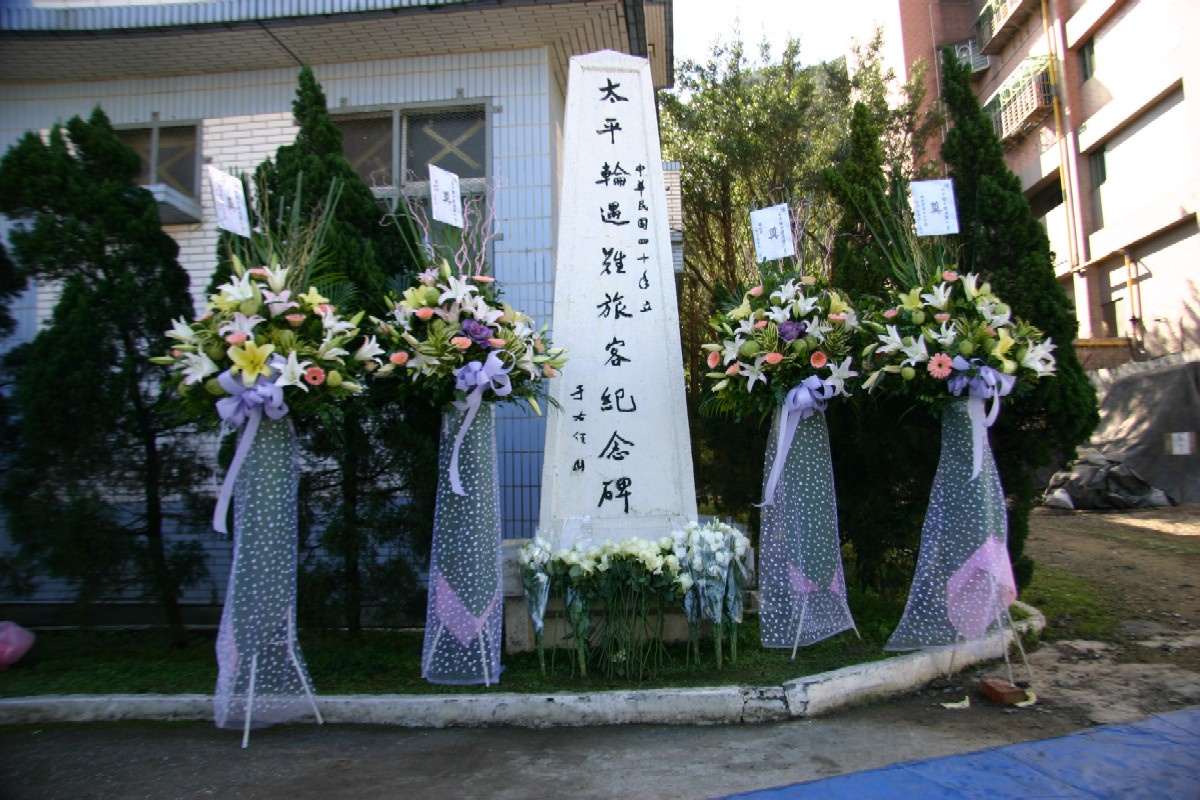
Memorial to the sinking in Keelung.

Taiping was a Chinese steamer that sank after a collision with a smaller cargo ship, Chienyuan, while en route from mainland China to Taiwan on 27 January 1949. With an estimated death toll of over 1,000 people, it ranks as one of the ten deadliest maritime disasters in history.

== Final voyage ==
Taiping was packed to nearly twice her rated capacity, carrying over 1,000 refugees fleeing advancing Chinese Communist forces during the Chinese Civil War, when she departed Shanghai on 26 January 1949, bound for Keelung. Some estimates put the number of passengers on board at over 1,500, although the ship was only rated to carry 580 passengers.

After midnight on 27 January 1949, Taiping was steaming at night with her lights out, owing to a curfew, when she collided with the smaller cargo ship Chienyuan near the Zhoushan Archipelago. She sank, killing over 1,000 passengers and crew members. Only about 50 survived, including 2 people from Chienyuan. Most of them were rescued by HMAS Warramunga.

== Commemoration ==
Taiping, which made many journeys between mainland China and Taiwan before her tragic end, has been compared to the Mayflower for her role in bringing Chinese immigrants to Taiwan. She has also been compared to RMS Titanic, which sank in 1912, owing to the similar loss of life in her sinking. A memorial to the ship and those who died aboard her was established at Keelung Harbor naval base on Taiwan.

== In popular culture ==
The Crossing, a 2014 film directed by John Woo, is about the sinking of Taiping.
