= Japanese immigrant villages in Taiwan =

The Japanese immigrant village in Taiwan was established during the Japanese colonial period between 1895 and 1945. The purpose of establishing this village was to provide suitable land for the Japanese immigrant to settle in Taiwan. The land that the government intended to establish as immigrant villages was to undergo a land and forestry survey to verify the land was vacant and assess its suitability to act as immigrant village land. The immigrant villages could be divided as privately conducted or publicly conducted. It could also be divided by occupation, a majority being farming immigrants, but also with fishing, mining, forestry and industrial immigration. The total number of Japanese immigrants during the colonial period was 500,000 people.

== Background ==
The purpose of establishing the villages was to resolve Japan’s overpopulation and to use Taiwan as a testing ground for expansion into the South Seas.

The immigration process was divided into four major periods.

The initial privately conducted immigration period 1895–1908, where the first immigrant village was established;

The publicly conducted period by the Karenkō Prefecture 1909–1917, which introduced around 1700 immigrants into Eastern Taiwan;

The privately conducted period by Taitō Prefecture 1917–1932, where the immigrants mainly settled in Taitung (台東);

The later publicly conducted immigration period 1932–1945, with its development based in Western Taiwan.

When Japanese colonial rule ended in October 1945, all Japanese immigrants were sent back to Japan but limited in the resources they could bring home. They were only permitted to take one set of winter and summer clothing, one blanket and with cash of no more than 1000 Yen.

== The Main immigrant villages ==
=== Kata Immigrant Village ===
In 1899, the Japanese entrepreneur Katakinsaburou (賀田金三郎) privately recruited immigrants to move to Taiwan. The Kata immigrant village (賀田移民村), established in Wuquan City (吳全城) of modern-day Hualien County, was not only the first immigrant village established in Eastern Taiwan, but also the first Japanese immigrant village in the world. There were around 133 families and 385 residences in the village. However, due to its geographic location and the fact of being a privately administrated village, locals lacked trust in the residents. Moreover, the immigrants could not achieve self-sufficiency and so several died and others returned to Japan. Hence, the first period of the Japanese Immigration was not so successful.

=== Yoshino Immigrant Village ===
This was the first publicly conduct immigrant village in 1909, after the government had already started actively promoting the immigration process. The Yoshino Immigrant Village (吉野移民村) was located in Hualien Qijiao creek (花蓮七腳川), where sugarcane was the main product. This was originally the land of a group of aboriginals (阿美族). For the purpose of promoting immigration, the government provided three years of free medical service, free land usage as well as subsidies for various expenses. The government also built clinics, primary schools, Japanese shrines and other public facilities.

== Immigrant life ==
The Japanese immigrant villages were designed in the same way as traditional Japanese villages. The houses were made of bamboo and wood with a layer of hay serving as the roof. Tatami mats also covered the floors. The immigrants’ main products were tobacco, sugar and rice. In order to increase the income of the immigrants, the Japanese government imported tobacco leaves to plant. They were then able to sell the tobacco leaves to tobacco factories and earn income. Since Eastern Taiwan had an ideal climate and terrain for growing sugarcane, the immigrants also planted this crop and produced sugar from it. The village also grew “Yoshino rice”, which was the only rice the Japanese emperor consumed.

== Japanese immigrant villages in Taiwan today ==
Although all Japanese immigrants were sent back to Japan after Japanese colonial rule ended, several immigrant villages still exist. These include Yoshino village (吉野村), Toyota village (豊田村) and Hayashita village (林田村). These villages are open to the public to see how life was for Japanese villagers in Taiwan during this period.
