= Himala =

1982 Filipino film about Marian apparitions, directed by Ishmael Bernal

- Theatrical release poster
- Directed by: Ishmael Bernal
- Screenplay by: Ricardo Lee
- Story by: Ricardo Lee
- Produced by: Bibsy N. Carballo
- Starring: Nora Aunor
- Cinematography: Sergio Lobo
- Edited by: Ike Jarlego, Jr.
- Music by: Winston Raval
- Production company: Experimental Cinema of the Philippines
- Distributed by: Experimental Cinema of the Philippines; Toho (Japan); Star Cinema (2012 remastered)
- Release date: December 25, 1982
- Running time: 124 minutes
- Country: Philippines
- Language: Filipino
- Budget: ₱3,000,000.00 (estimate)
- Box office: ₱30,000,000.00 (estimate)

Himala ('Miracle') is a 1982 Philippine religious drama film directed by Ishmael Bernal and produced by the Experimental Cinema of the Philippines. It stars Nora Aunor as a young woman living in the province who claims to have seen a Marian apparition. The film story and script written by Ricky Lee was inspired by a series of alleged Marian apparitions experienced by schoolgirls from 1966 to 1972 on Cabra Island in Lubang, Occidental Mindoro.

The film premiered at the 1982 Metro Manila Film Festival, where it won Best Film and Best Actress for Aunor, among other awards. It then became the first Filipino film to be included in the Competition section of the Berlin International Film Festival. In 2012, on its 30th anniversary, Himala became the first film to be restored as part of the ABS-CBN Film Restoration Project, with a premiere at the 69th Venice International Film Festival as part of the Venice Classics section.

While getting positive reviews upon on its initial release, Himala is still widely considered today as one of the greatest Filipino films of all time. Nora Aunor garnered worldwide popularity and is best known for her performance in the film as the purported seer and healer Elsa. Her portrayal is considered by most Filipino critics as one of the best of her career. On November 11, 2008, Himala won the Viewer's Choice Award for the Best Film of All Time from the Asia-Pacific Region in the 2008 CNN Asia Pacific Screen Awards beating nine other films voted by thousands of film fans around the world. The ten finalists were chosen by critics, industry insiders and actors.

Himala was later adapted by Lee and Vincent A. de Jesus as a stage musical in 2003, and into a musical film titled Isang Himala in 2024, which is an entry for the 2024 Metro Manila Film Festival.

== Plot ==
The small town of Cupang, located in an arid landscape, is suffering from a drought which the townsfolk believe is a curse, divine retribution placed upon them for driving away a leper years before.

During a solar eclipse, a girl named Elsa reports seeing an apparition of the Virgin Mary near a dried tree atop a barren hill, where her adoptive mother Salíng found her as a baby. The local priest interrogates and doubts her, but Elsa soon after engages in faith healing for the residents. She is assisted by her friends Chayong, Sepa, and Baldo who eventually became part of her "Seven Apostles", which later includes the entrepreneur Mrs. Alba. Word spreads, drawing pilgrims and the curious to Cupang and Elsa's house, which is marked with a large banner proclaiming “Elsa Loves You”. At the same time, enterprising residents of Cupang begin selling food, religious articles, offering accommodation–all capitalizing on the sudden influx of local and foreign patients and tourists.

A Manila-based filmmaker named Orly arrives in town to make a documentary on Elsa, interviewing her and those who personally know her. Around the same time, Elsa's childhood friend Nimia, now a prostitute, returns to Cupang. Nimia establishes a kabaret (nightclub/brothel) for tourists, which is later ordered closed by the Seven Apostles.

One day, Orly approaches the town priest in the church's confessional. He tells the priest that he saw two drugged youths from Manila rape Elsa and Chayong on the hill of apparitions. Orly tries to unburden himself of his tremendous guilt and is unsure whether to publish his video of the incident.

A cholera epidemic spreads throughout Cupang, with Sepa's two children dying after eating tainted meat. Chayong is still traumatised by the rape, so she hangs herself out of shame. As the townsfolk process the three bodies to the graveyard, a fourth coffin follows; the deceased's crazed mother chastises Elsa, accusing her of failing to heal her child. Authorities quarantine Elsa's house, closing it off from would-be patients, while Elsa blames herself for the deaths and decides to stop healing. Eventually, the pilgrims and tourists stop coming, returning the town to its sleepy state.

Elsa is seen throwing up from morning sickness, indicating her pregnancy from the rape. Mrs. Alba erroneously concludes that it is an "immaculate conception" (when she meant virgin birth), and declares it proof of Elsa's sanctity. At that exact moment, thunder roars from the skies, followed by a sudden downpour. The townsfolk rejoice, convinced the miracle has returned and the curse on Cupang has finally been lifted. Mrs. Alba and the crowd rush to Elsa's house and call out to her while dancing in the rain. Elsa emerges from her window, and commands her devotees to assemble the townsfolk and pilgrims on the hill.

Speaking before an eager crowd, an initially apprehensive Elsa confesses that there were no miracles, no sightings of the Virgin, and that man invents gods, miracles, and curses. In the middle of her impassioned speech, a gun is fired at Elsa, mortally wounding her. A stampede ensues, with the old, the children, and the infirm being injured or killed in the mass hysteria.

Lying in Salíng's arms, Elsa takes her last breath as she gazes at the sky, while Orly and the press record her final moments. Baldo announces Elsa's death, eliciting wailing and weeping from the people who then rush towards the makeshift stage. Elsa's body is lifted and carried into a waiting ambulance, lying as though she was crucified – as the throng clambers to touch her. People scamper all over the hill and its precincts to follow the ambulance speeding away. Against her husband's will, Sepa addresses the crowd, proclaiming Elsa a saint (by implying she is a victim soul) and how they must continue her devotion to the Virgin. Sepa and the congregation then fall on their knees and creep up the hill, repeatedly reciting the Hail Mary.

== Cast ==
- Nora Aunor as Elsa, 24-year-old a young woman of Cupang who allegedly had a Marian apparition.
- Spanky Manikan as Orly, a skeptical journalist from Manila
- Gigi Dueñas as Nimia, a close friend of Elsa
- Laura Centeno as Chayong, a close friend of Elsa
- Vangie Labalan as Aling Saling, Elsa's mother
- Veronica Palileo as Mrs. Alba
- Ama Quiambao as Sepa, a devotee of Elsa
- Ben Almeda as Baldo
- Cris Daluz as Igme
- Aura Mijares as Mrs. Gonzales
- Joel Lamangan as Priest
- Ray Ventura as Bino
- Pen Medina (credited as "Crispin Medina") as Pilo
- Tony Angeles as Chief of Police
- Joe Gruta as Mayor
- Estela de Leon as Bella
- Lem Garcellano as Narding
- Cesar Dimaculangan as Lucio
- Mahatma Canda as Blind Man
- Vicky Castillo as Beggas
- Richard Arellano as Nestoy
- Erwin Jacinto as Intong

== Production ==
=== Pre-production ===
Ricky Lee began to write the script for Himala in 1976 under director, Mike de Leon. Ricky Lee (although requested to be uncredited), Gil Quito and Doy del Mundo together co-written Itim. Quito told Lee, about a female faith healer he and a friend visited in Malolos, Bulacan. The faith healer was cured of cancer by another faith healer, leading her to be a faith healer herself. She insists that medicine is just as good as the faith of people, but soon her cancer came back and eventually took her life. This intrigued Lee, enough so that he began to think about writing a story revolving around a faith healer, and soon he and Quito visited another faith healer in Tondo, Manila. While they were visiting, Lee and Quito remembered the story of Belinda Villas, of Cabra Island in Lubang, Occidental Mindoro. In 1966, the eleven-year-old Villas and several friends reported experiencing visions of the Blessed Virgin Mary dressed in white and blue, with her as the principal seer eventually healing people. The island experienced a boom in commerce, and this became the main inspiration for Lee's screenplay.

With the help of Bibsy Carballo, Lee approached several producers to promote the script but was rejected several times. He entered the script to a contest by the Experimental Cinema of the Philippines where it became one of the selected scripts for production. Lee was given a month to come up with the final draft and was given ₱40,000. Several aspects of the script were revised. One of the unchanged parts is the casting of Nora Aunor as Elsa.

==== Alternate versions ====
Lee came up with different endings for the script of Himala. In one version, Elsa did not die; the townsfolk gradually stopped flocking to her and she reverted to being an ordinary person. Many years later, Orly chances upon Elsa drawing water from an old well, having fallen into obscurity along with her "miracle." In another ending, Elsa was resurrected like Jesus Christ. In the end and the beginning, Elsa's devotees are depicted awaiting her return to continue healing the sick townsfolk.

=== Development ===
Shooting began on July 13, 1982, with the arrival of the art department in Paoay, Ilocos Norte led by production designer, Raquel Villavicencio. The production team needed a location for the main setting of the film: a barren and arid land where plants hardly grow and where the soil cracks, suggesting that a slight rain would be considered a miracle by inhabitants. The problem encountered by the team is the shooting took place during the rainy season in the Philippines, and the film was to premiere at the 1982 Metro Manila Film Festival. The region of Ilocos was selected as shooting location of the film after scouting locations around the country for the driest place.

Barangay Calayab in Laoag was used to depict the village of Cupang, with ten carpenters working 24/7 on the set. Around 3,000 extras were employed for the film. Director Ishmael Bernal also asked people actually inflicted by various conditions and diseases to portray the infirm within the film.

Bernal also called for the film to be minimalist, direct to the point, and "straight to the soul", discouraging unnecessary dramatic effects. For example, the characters of Elsa and Nimia stood still, with minimal gestures in the scene where they argue as it focused on the dialogue.

Another key element of the film was the bare tree where the Virgin Mary supposedly appeared. The tree was against the sky on top of a hill, but it was actually transplanted to the originally barren hilltop. The production team found the bare tree among green, leafy ones near the area, and it was discovered to be a hibiscus after it began sprouting leaves.

For the final scene at Suba Beach, the 3,000 extras were called to participate which were divided into eight groups. Rain fell and the August 6 shooting had to be postponed, while several of the extras fell sick. By the end of August, shooting for the final scene was finished. Eight cameras were used with one placed below a Meralco crane. 3,000 extras were still used for the scene which was done in one take. Production costs for the film grew due to delays caused by rain and in at least one occasion, a sandstorm. The shooting for the film took two months.

== Subject and impact ==
Himala is the story of Elsa, a barrio lass whose supposed visions of the Virgin Mary change her life, turning her into an overnight sensation and causing mass hysteria in a poor, isolated northern Philippine village suffering from a drought. The film is centred on the issues of religious faith and faithlessness, morality, and truth. As Elsa, Aunor delivered the film's most iconic line in the climax:

"Waláng himalâ! Ang himalâ ay nasa pusò ng tao, nasa pusò nating lahat! Tayo ang gumagawâ ng mga himalâ! Tayo ang gumagawâ ng mga sumpâ at ng mga diyos..."
("There is no miracle! Miracles are in people's hearts, in all our hearts! We are the ones who make miracles! We are the ones who make curses, and gods...")

== Release ==
Himala became a sleeper hit, earning ₱30 million, becoming one of the highest grossing Filipino films in the 1980s.

The film premiered at the 1982 Metro Manila Film Festival, where it swept the festival awards, including Best Picture, as well as Best Actress for Nora Aunor. It made its international premiere at the 33rd Berlin International Film Festival, becoming the first Filipino film to be included in the Competition section where it vied for the Golden Bear. It would go on to win the Bronze Hugo Award in the 1983 Chicago International Film Festival. In 1983, the film had the honor of opening the second and last iteration of the Manila International Film Festival, which was chaired by then First Lady Imelda Marcos.

=== Restoration ===
In 2012, coinciding with the film's 30th anniversary, Himala became the first film to be restored by the ABS-CBN Film Restoration Project with Central Digital Lab. ABS-CBN Film Archives head Leo Katigbak had been looking to upgrade the network library, particularly Himala and Peque Gallaga's 1982 film Oro, Plata, Mata, when he met Central Digital Lab head Maynet Dayrit who also had an interest in specifically restoring Himala. The restoration took 700 hours of manual work. The digitally restored version of the Himala premiered at the 69th Venice International Film Festival as part of the Venice Classics section before being released in Philippine cinemas.

== Reception ==
Himala has won numerous awards and distinctions in the Philippines and abroad, including Best Picture from the 1982 Metro Manila Film Festival and the 1983 Catholic Mass Media Awards.

At the Metro Manila Film Festival, the film swept nine of the eleven awards available. Aunor won the Best Actress award for her role in the film, and was nominated for other top acting awards in the Philippines. She was nominated for Best Actress at the 33rd Berlin International Film Festival, where Himala vied in the prestigious competition for the Golden Bear Award. The film was personally handpicked by Festival Director Moritz de Hadeln in the official selection.

The film's international honors also included the Bronze Hugo prize at the 1983 Chicago International Film Festival; it received a special religious citation in the 1983 Asia-Pacific Film Festival held in Taipei, Taiwan; and it was selected as the opening film for the 1983 Manila International Film Festival.

=== Legacy ===
Himala was adjudged by the Manunuri ng Pelikulang Pilipino as one of the Ten Best Films of the Decade, and is now considered one of the greatest Filipino films of all time.

In June 2022, the film's leading actress Nora Aunor was formally named a National Artist of the Philippines in the category of Film and Broadcasting Arts, with the Film Development Council of the Philippines citing her career in depicting the "everyday realities and aspirations" of Filipinos in important films such as Himala. That same year, the film's screenwriter Ricky Lee was also named a National Artist of the Philippines. In 2001, the film's director, Ishmael Bernal, had been posthumously conferred the same honor as a National Artist of the Philippines, with Himala cited as one of his notable films.

The film was given the Viewers Choice Award for Best Asia-Pacific Film of All Time, the awarding a joint production of CNN International and the Asia Pacific Screen Awards in 2008. It received 32 percent of the viewer votes, ahead of Akira Kurosawa's 1954 epic film Seven Samurai and Ang Lee's 2000 wuxia film Crouching Tiger, Hidden Dragon, which were second and third, respectively. Himala was the only Filipino film to make the shortlist, with CNN International citing it for its "austere camera work, haunting score and accomplished performances [that] sensitively portray the harsh social and cultural conditions that people in the third world endure."

=== Accolades ===
Year	Award	Category	Nominee(s)	Result
1982	Metro Manila Film Festival	Best Film	Himala	Won
1982	Metro Manila Film Festival	Best Director	Ishmael Bernal	Won
1982	Metro Manila Film Festival	Best Actress	Nora Aunor	Won
1982	Metro Manila Film Festival	Best Supporting Actor	Spanky Manikan	Won
1982	Metro Manila Film Festival	Best Supporting Actress	Gigi Dueñas	Won
1982	Metro Manila Film Festival	Best Editing	Ike Jarlego Jr. and Ben Pelayo	Won
1982	Metro Manila Film Festival	Best Cinematography	Sergio Lobo	Won
1982	Metro Manila Film Festival	Best Sound Engineering	Rolly Ruta	Won
1982	Metro Manila Film Festival	Best Art Direction	Raquel Villavicencio	Won
1983	Berlin International Film Festival	Golden Bear	Himala	Nominated
1983	Chicago International Film Festival	Bronze Hugo	Himala	Won
1983	FAMAS Awards	Best Picture	Himala	Nominated
1983	FAMAS Awards	Best Director	Ishmael Bernal	Nominated
1983	FAMAS Awards	Best Supporting Actress	Gigi Dueñas	Nominated
1983	FAP Awards	Best Actress	Nora Aunor	Nominated
1983	Gawad Urian Awards	Best Picture (Pinakamahusay na Pelikula)	Himala	Nominated
1983	Gawad Urian Awards	Best Direction (Pinakamahusay na Direksyon)	Ishmael Bernal	Nominated
1983	Gawad Urian Awards	Best Actress (Pinakamahusay na Pangunahing Aktres)	Nora Aunor	Nominated
1983	Gawad Urian Awards	Best Supporting Actress (Pinakamahusay na Pangalawang Aktres)	Gigi Dueñas	Nominated
1983	Gawad Urian Awards	Best Supporting Actress (Pinakamahusay na Pangalawang Aktres)	Ama Quiambao	Nominated
1983	Gawad Urian Awards	Best Screenplay (Pinakamahusay na Dulang Pampelikula)	Ricky Lee	Nominated
1983	Gawad Urian Awards	Best Production Design (Pinakamahusay na Disenyong Pamproduksiyon)	Raquel Villavicencio	Nominated
1983	Gawad Urian Awards	Best Sound (Pinakamahusay na Tunog)	Vic Macamay	Nominated

== Adaptations ==
In 2003, the film's original screenwriter Ricky Lee, with composer Vincent de Jesus, adapted the film into the musical Himala: Isang Musikal. De Jesus recalled watching the film as a teenager and feeling unsettled "because it showed how good people go wrong, how blind faith deludes the most loyal believers." It was staged at the Cultural Center of the Philippines by its resident theater company Tanghalang Pilipino in 2003, and again in 2004. The adaptation won Aliw Awards for its director Soxie Topacio, as well as actress May Bayot who played the lead role of Elsa. In 2008, the musical adaptation was presented at the Asian Contemporary Theater Festival as representative of the Philippines, the first in the festival's history.

For the musical adaptation's 10th anniversary, it was produced as a dramatized concert by the Philippine Educational Theater Association with most of the original cast, including Aliw Award-winning Bayot reprising the role of Elsa, and the original artistic staff. In 2018, the musical was restaged by 9 Works Theatrical and The Sandbox Collective at the Power Mac Center Spotlight Theater in Circuit Makati under the direction of Ed Lacson Jr., starring Aicelle Santos as Elsa and Bituin Escalante as Aling Saling. The production swept the Gawad Buhay Awards, including acting awards for Santos and Escalante, and was restaged by the same production company the following year due to popular demand.

The two-act musical generally follows the plot of the film, with the lyrics of the final song "Walang Himala (The Miracle Was a Lie)" retaining the original text of Elsa's speech from the film. In the musical adaptation, however, the character of Elsa is more active in making of her own myth in contrast to her almost passive participation in the film.

Isang Himala, a feature film adapted from the 2018 musical, was one of the official entries to the 2024 Metro Manila Film Festival; Santos and many cast members reprised their stage roles.
