= Our Lady of Cabra Island =

Marian apparition in the Philippines (1966–1972)

Our Lady of Cabra Island is a title of a purported apparition of the Blessed Virgin Mary to several schoolgirls on Cabra Island, Lubang, Occidental Mindoro, the Philippines, from 1966 to 1972.

== Visions ==
The supposed visions were first reported by a sixth grader, Belinda Villas, and her seven friends from the same grade level at Cabra Elementary School. The children described the figure in the alleged apparitions as a "beautiful lady wearing a white robe and a blue sash around her waist". She also wore a blue veil, and held a red rosary in her hands.

Their school's principal, Juana V. Torreliza, then urged the children from the beginning to jot down the details of their encounters. One recorded vision has the lady smiling and with a sweet, reassuring voice, telling them in Tagalog: “Ako ang Inmaculada Concepción.” (“I am the Immaculate Conception.”)

While a small chapel has since been erected on the hilltop where the supposed apparitions occurred, the incident has not been formally approved by the Philippine Church or the Holy See.

== Legacy ==
The children's accounts led to a growing number of pilgrims from Manila and other islands. Their individual stories, notes, photographs, and the messages from the “lady bathed in light, and always smiling, always with a kindly expression on her face” were documented and published in the 1978 book The Apparitions of Cabra Islet. Copies can be found in many Catholic college libraries, in the National Library of the Philippines and the United States Library of Congress.

== Cultural influence ==
The purported apparitions eventually inspired the 1982 Ishmael Bernal drama film Himala, starring Nora Aunor and with screenplay by Ricky Lee. Produced by the Experimental Cinema of the Philippines, the film was first exhibited overseas in the Berlin International Film Festival. It later won the Viewer's Choice Award for the Best Film of All Time from the Asia-Pacific Region in the 2008 CNN Asia Pacific Screen Awards.
