= Ambil, Looc =

Ambil
- Barangay
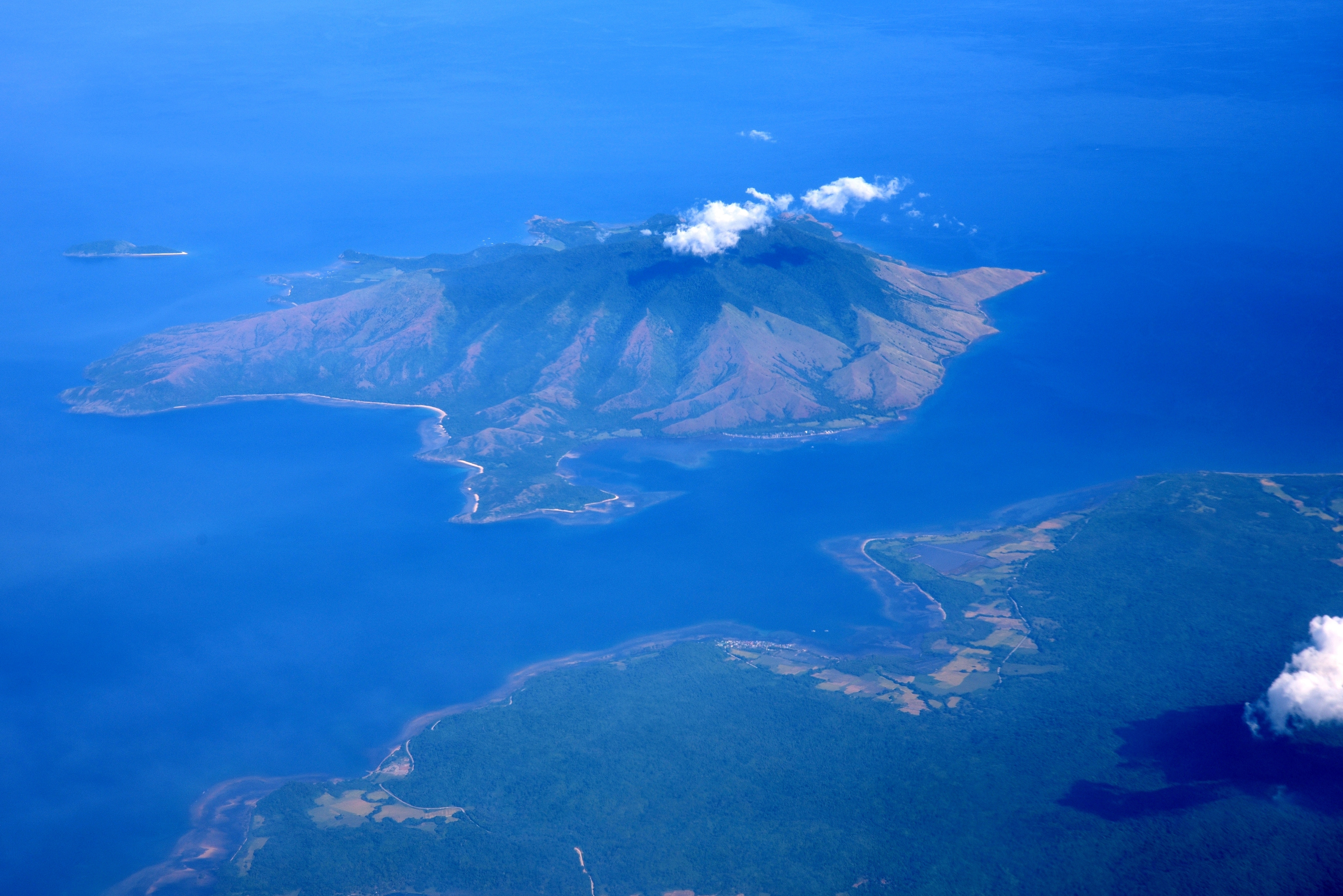
- Aerial view of Ambil Island from the west
- Interactive map of Ambil
- Location within Luzon Location within Philippines
- Coordinates: 13.793°N 120.275°E
- Country: Philippines
- Region: Mimaropa
- Province: Occidental Mindoro
- Municipality: Looc

Government
  - Type: Barangay
- Highest elevation (Mount Benagongon): 750 m (2,460 ft)
- Lowest elevation: 0 m (0 ft)

Population (2020)
  - Total: 1,725
- Time zone: UTC+8 (PST)

Ambil is an island barangay in the municipality of Looc, Occidental Mindoro, Philippines. It covers the island of the same name along with the two other smaller outlying islands of Mandaui and Malavatuan to the northeast. One of Looc's nine barangays, Ambil had a population of 1,927 in the 2024 census.

== Geography ==
Ambil Island lies east of Lubang Island, separated from Tagbanan Point on Lubang by Ambil Pass. The island is conical and about 755 metres (2,477 ft) high, while Mandaui and Malavatuan lie to its northeast. The island, which is the 93rd largest island in the Philippines, was formed by a conical mountain, Mount Benagongon.

== See also ==
- List of islands of the Philippines
