= Mandaui =

Island in the Philippines

Geography
- Location: South China Sea
- Coordinates: 13.836°N 120.330°E
- Archipelago: Lubang Group of Islands

Administration
- Philippines
- Region: Mimaropa
- Province: Occidental Mindoro
- Municipality: Looc
- Barangay: Ambil

Mandaui is a small island in the Philippines and part of the Lubang group of islands. It is around .75 miles (1.21 km) northeast of Ambil Island and is administered under the barangay of Ambil, in the municipality of Looc, Occidental Mindoro. The island has two "small hills of uneven height."

== See also ==
- List of islands of the Philippines
