= Malavatuan =

Island in the Philippines

Malabatuan

Geography
- Location: South China Sea
- Coordinates: 13.863°N 120.346°E
- Archipelago: Lubang Group of Islands

Administration
- Philippines
- Region: Mimaropa
- Province: Occidental Mindoro
- Municipality: Looc
- Barangay: Ambil

Malavatuan or Malabatuan is a small island in the Philippines and part of the Lubang group of islands. It is around 3 miles (4.8 km) northeast of Ambil Island and is administered under the barangay of Ambil, in the municipality of Looc, Occidental Mindoro. In 1919 it was denoted as being covered in brushwood (branches and twigs fallen from trees and shrubs).

== See also ==
- List of islands of the Philippines
