= Norio Suzuki =

Norio Suzuki may refer to:

- Norio Suzuki (golfer) (鈴木 規夫, born 1951), Japanese golfer
- Norio Suzuki (explorer) (鈴木 紀夫, 1949–1986), Japanese explorer
- Norio Suzuki (footballer) (鈴木 規郎, born 1984), Japanese footballer
