= Hiroo Onoda =

Imperial Japanese Army officer (1922–2014)

Hirō Onoda
- 小野田 寛郎
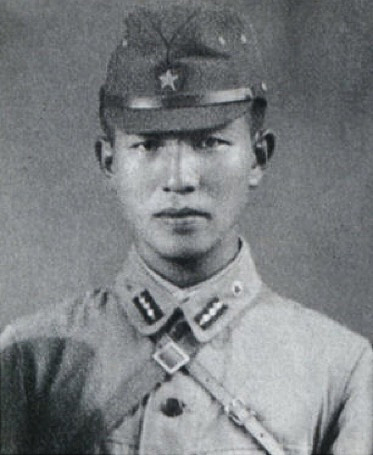
- Onoda, c. 1944
- Born: 19 March 1922; Kamekawa, Wakayama, Empire of Japan
- Died: 16 January 2014 (aged 91); Tokyo, Japan
- Military career
- Allegiance: Empire of Japan
- Branch: Imperial Japanese Army
- Service years: 1942–1974
- Rank: Second lieutenant
- Conflicts: World War II; Philippines campaign (1944–1945)

Hirō Onoda (Japanese: 小野田 寛郎, Hepburn: Onoda Hirō; IPA: [o̞no̞da̠ çiɾo̞ː]; often written Hiroo Onoda) (19 March 1922 – 16 January 2014) was a Japanese soldier who served as a second lieutenant in the Imperial Japanese Army during World War II. One of the last Japanese holdouts, Onoda continued fighting for nearly 29 years after the war's end in 1945, carrying out guerrilla warfare on Lubang Island in the Philippines until 1974.

Onoda initially held out with three other soldiers. One surrendered in 1950, and the other two were killed, one in 1954 and one in 1972. The men did not believe flyers and letters from their families stating that the war was over. They survived on wild fruits, game, and stolen rice, and occasionally engaged in shootouts with locals and police, as well as attacking and killing civilians. Onoda was contacted in the jungles of Lubang by Japanese adventurer Norio Suzuki in 1974 but still refused to surrender until he was formally relieved of duty by his former commanding officer, Major Yoshimi Taniguchi, who flew from Japan to the island to issue the order.

Onoda surrendered on 10 March 1974 and received a hero's welcome when he returned to Japan. That year, he wrote and published an autobiography and later moved to Brazil, where he became a cattle rancher. In 1984, Onoda returned to Japan, where he died in 2014 at the age of 91.

== Early life and service ==
Onoda was born on 19 March 1922, in Kamekawa, Wakayama, in the Empire of Japan. In 1939, he went to work at a branch of the Tajima Yoko trading company in Wuhan, China, and in 1942 was conscripted into the Imperial Japanese Army. Onoda trained as an intelligence officer at the Futamata branch of the army's Nakano School, where he was instructed in guerrilla warfare.

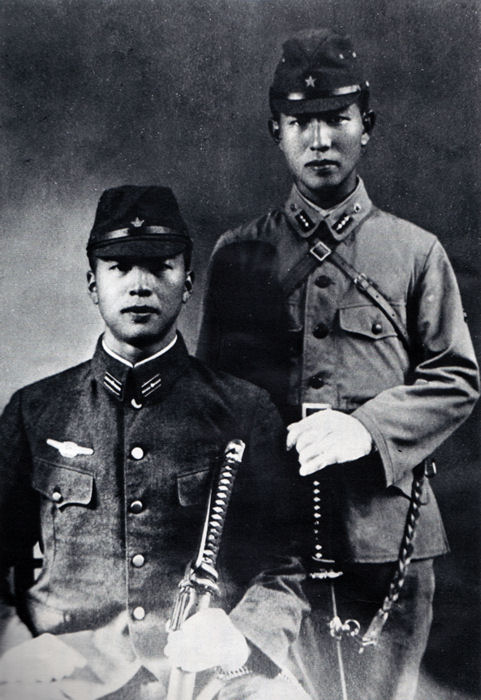
Hirō Onoda (right) and his younger brother Shigeo, c. 1944

On 26 December 1944, Onoda was sent to lead guerrilla warfare operations on Lubang Island in the Japanese-occupied Philippines. His mission was to destroy the island's airstrip and the pier at its harbor ahead of the Allied invasion as well as to destroy any enemy planes or boats that attempted to land. His orders explicitly stated that under no circumstances was he to surrender or take his own life. When Onoda arrived on Lubang, he encountered officers who outranked him and prevented him from carrying out his mission, which aided American and Philippine resistance movement forces in capturing the island when they landed, on 28 February 1945. After a short period, all but Second Lieutenant Onoda and three other soldiers (Private Yuichi Akatsu, Corporal Shōichi Shimada, and Private First Class Kinshichi Kozuka) had died or surrendered. Onoda led the three men into the island's mountains.

== Time in hiding ==
While in hiding, Onoda and his companions continued their mission, carrying out guerrilla activities, surviving on bananas, coconuts, stolen rice and cattle, and on several occasions engaging in shootouts with locals and police.

=== First time seeing surrender announcement ===
The first time Onoda's group saw a leaflet announcing that Japan had surrendered was in October 1945: a separate group of Japanese holdouts showed them a note left behind by islanders that read: "The war ended on 15 August. Come down from the mountains!" The men concluded that the leaflet was Allied propaganda and reasoned that they would not have been fired on before if the war had ended. Near the end of 1945, leaflets with a surrender order from General Tomoyuki Yamashita of the Japanese Fourteenth Area Army were dropped by air on Lubang. Onoda's group studied them to determine whether they were genuine and decided that they were not.

Despite repeated attempts by Japanese authorities to convince him that the war had ended through leaflets, search missions, and radio broadcasts, Onoda remained convinced that these messages were a form of enemy propaganda. He continued his attacks on civilians, allegedly killing up to 30 people on the island. Some victims were attacked while accompanied by their children or grandchildren, and accounts describe these incidents as involving extreme violence, including the use of knives and other weapons.

According to Beatrice Trefalt, a Japan scholar of Monash University, Onoda's claim that he was unaware of the war's conclusion is questionable. She notes that while he later maintained that he did not know the conflict had ended, Onoda was not completely isolated from outside information, as he had access to sources such as newspapers and carried a transistor radio while living on Lubang Island.

=== Surrender of Akatsu ===
Akatsu separated from the group in September 1949, and after six months on his own, surrendered to Philippine forces in March 1950. The others considered this a desertion and a betrayal and became even more cautious as a result. In February 1952, letters from the three soldiers' families, urging their surrender, along with family photographs, were dropped by air, but the group concluded that it was a trick.

=== Death of Shimada ===
Shimada was wounded in the leg in a shootout with local fishers in June 1953, after which Onoda nursed him back to health. On 7 May 1954, Shimada was killed in a shootout with a Philippine Army mountain unit that accidentally encountered the soldiers while training on the island.

=== Death of Kozuka ===
On 19 October 1972, Kozuka was killed in a shootout with local police while conducting a recurring raid in which he and Onoda would burn piles of rice harvested by villagers, which they intended as a signal to fellow Japanese forces that their group was still alive and carrying out its duties on Lubang. Onoda was alone from this point on.

=== Surrender and return to Japan ===
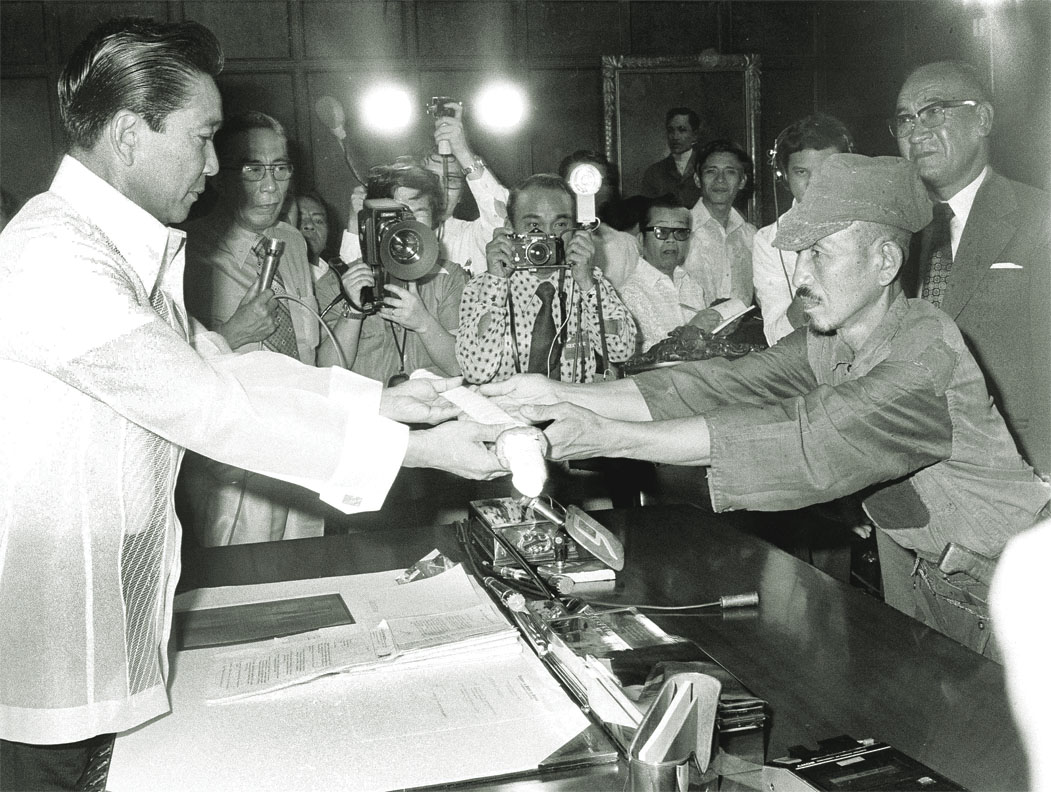
Onoda surrendering his sword to Philippine President Ferdinand Marcos on 11 March 1974

On 20 February 1974, Onoda encountered Norio Suzuki, a Japanese adventurer who was traveling around the world and had told friends he was looking for "Lieutenant Onoda, a panda, and the abominable snowman, in that order". Suzuki located Onoda after four days of searching on Lubang. Onoda later described their meeting in an interview: "This hippie boy, Suzuki, came to the island to listen to the feelings of a Japanese soldier". He and Suzuki became friends, but Onoda still refused to surrender, telling Suzuki that he was waiting for orders from his commanding officer. He named Major Yoshimi Taniguchi (commander of the Special Intelligence Squadron of the Fourteenth Area Army, who had given Onoda his final instructions) as such, although technically, Onoda's immediate superior was the deceased Lieutenant General Shizuo Yokoyama, commander of the Eighth Division, who had issued his orders.

Suzuki returned to Japan with photographs of Onoda as proof of their encounter, after which the government located Taniguchi, who had become a bookseller following the war. Taniguchi flew to Lubang with Suzuki, and on 9 March met with Onoda in the jungle and issued him the following orders:

1. In accordance with the Imperial Command, the Fourteenth Area Army has ceased all combat activity.
2. In accordance with Military Headquarters Command No. A–2003, the Special Squadron in the Chief of Staff's Headquarters is relieved of all military duties.
3. Units and individuals under the command of the Special Squadron are to cease military activities and operations immediately and place themselves under the command of the nearest superior officer. When no officer can be found, they are to communicate with the American or Philippine forces and follow their directives.

Onoda was thus relieved of duty, and on 10 March 1974 surrendered to Philippine forces at Lubang's radar base. On 11 March, a formal surrender ceremony was held by Philippine President Ferdinand Marcos at Malacañang Palace in Manila, which attracted attention from the international press. Marcos granted Onoda a full pardon for any crimes he had committed while in hiding. Onoda turned over his sword, a functioning Type 99 rifle, 500 rounds of ammunition, and several hand grenades, as well as a dagger his mother had given him in 1944 to kill himself if captured. He had held out for 28 years, 6 months, and 8 days (10,416 days) after Japan's surrender in 1945. Only Private Teruo Nakamura, arrested on 18 December 1974 in Indonesia, held out longer.

== Later life ==
Onoda, who had been declared dead by the Japanese government in 1959, was the subject of widespread attention from the press and public upon his return to Japan in 1974. He was reportedly unhappy at receiving such attention and at what he saw as the withering of traditional Japanese values. He wrote No Surrender: My Thirty-Year War, an autobiography published in 1974. However, in 1976, Tsuda Shin, the book's ghostwriter, published the book The Imaginary Hero: Three Months with Officer Onoda, in which he stated that Onoda's autobiography was not a purely personal account but a carefully constructed narrative shaped by Onoda and Japanese publishing professionals. Furthermore, Tsuda stated that Onoda was aware the war had ended but chose to continue his violence on Lubang Island, adding that Onoda took pleasure in murder. He later expressed regret for his role in writing Onoda's book.

In April 1975, Onoda followed the example of his elder brother Tadao and left Japan for Brazil, where he became a cattle farmer. He married in 1976 and assumed a leading role in the Colônia Jamic, a Japanese Brazilian community in Terenos, Mato Grosso do Sul. After reading about a case in which a Japanese teenager murdered his parents in 1980, Onoda returned to Japan in 1984 and established the Onoda Shizen Juku, an educational camp for young people in Fukushima Prefecture.

After the war, Filipino news media interviewed villagers who had lived on Lubang during Onoda's time in hiding and alleged that he and his men had killed up to thirty civilians. Onoda had not mentioned these deaths in his autobiography, however. In 1996, he visited the town of Looc on Lubang after his wife Machie (née Honoku) arranged a US$10,000 scholarship donation on his behalf to the local school. The town council presented Onoda with a resolution asking him to compensate the families of seven people whom he had allegedly killed, and about fifty close relatives of the alleged victims staged a protest against his visit.

After 1984, Onoda spent three months of the year in Brazil and the rest in Japan. For allowing the Brazilian Air Force to conduct training sessions on his land, he was awarded the Santos-Dumont Merit Medal on 6 December 2004. On 21 February 2010, the Legislative Assembly of Mato Grosso do Sul awarded him honorary citizenship.

In 2006, his wife Machie became head of the conservative Japan Women's Association, which had been established in 2001 by the ultranationalist organization Nippon Kaigi.

== Death ==
On 16 January 2014, Onoda died of heart failure resulting from pneumonia at St. Luke's International Hospital in Tokyo. Chief Cabinet Secretary Yoshihide Suga commented on his death, saying, "I vividly remember that I was reassured of the end of the war when Mr. Onoda returned to Japan".

== Bibliography ==
- Onoda, Hiroo (1974). わがルバン島の30年戦争 [The Thirty Years' War on Our Island of Lubang] (in Japanese). Tokyo: Kodansha. OCLC 976947108.
- Onoda, Hiroo (1974). No Surrender: My Thirty-Year War. Translated by Terry, Charles S. New York: Kodansha International. ISBN 978-0-87011-240-9.

=== Interviews ===
- "Hirō Onoda describes his private thirty years of war against the United States". Broadcast on The Mike Douglas Show, 14 February 1975. OCLC 27191000

== Representation in other media ==
- Nude – 1981 concept album by the English progressive rock band Camel, based on Onoda's story
- Onoda: 10,000 Nights in the Jungle – 2021 French film co-written and directed by Arthur Harari based on historic accounts of Onoda's life
- The Twilight World – 2021 novel by German director Werner Herzog

== See also ==
- Shoichi Yokoi – another Japanese holdout, discovered on Guam in 1972
