= Cabra Island Lighthouse =

Historic lighthouse in Occidental Mindoro, Philippines

Cabra Island lighthouse
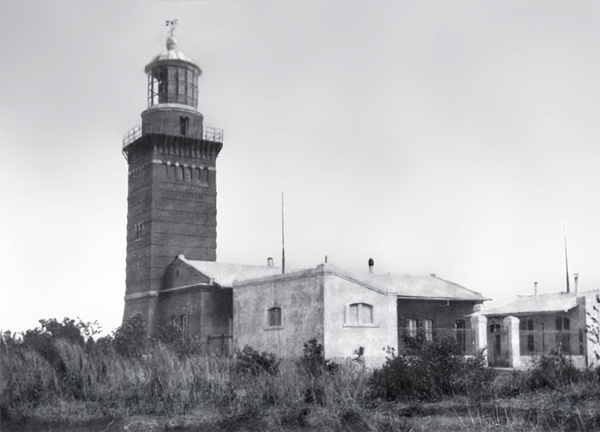
- The lighthouse in 1903
- Location: Cabra Island, Lubang, Occidental Mindoro, Philippines
- Coordinates: 13°53′19″N 120°01′24″E

Tower
- Constructed: 1889
- Construction: brick masonry tower
- Height: 20.5 metres (67 ft)
- Shape: square tower with balcony and lantern
- Markings: white tower

Light
- First lit: 1 March 1889
- Focal height: 66 metres (217 ft)
- Lens: first-order Fresnel lens
- Range: 25 nautical miles (29 mi; 46 km)
- Characteristic: Oc W 5s.
- Modern light
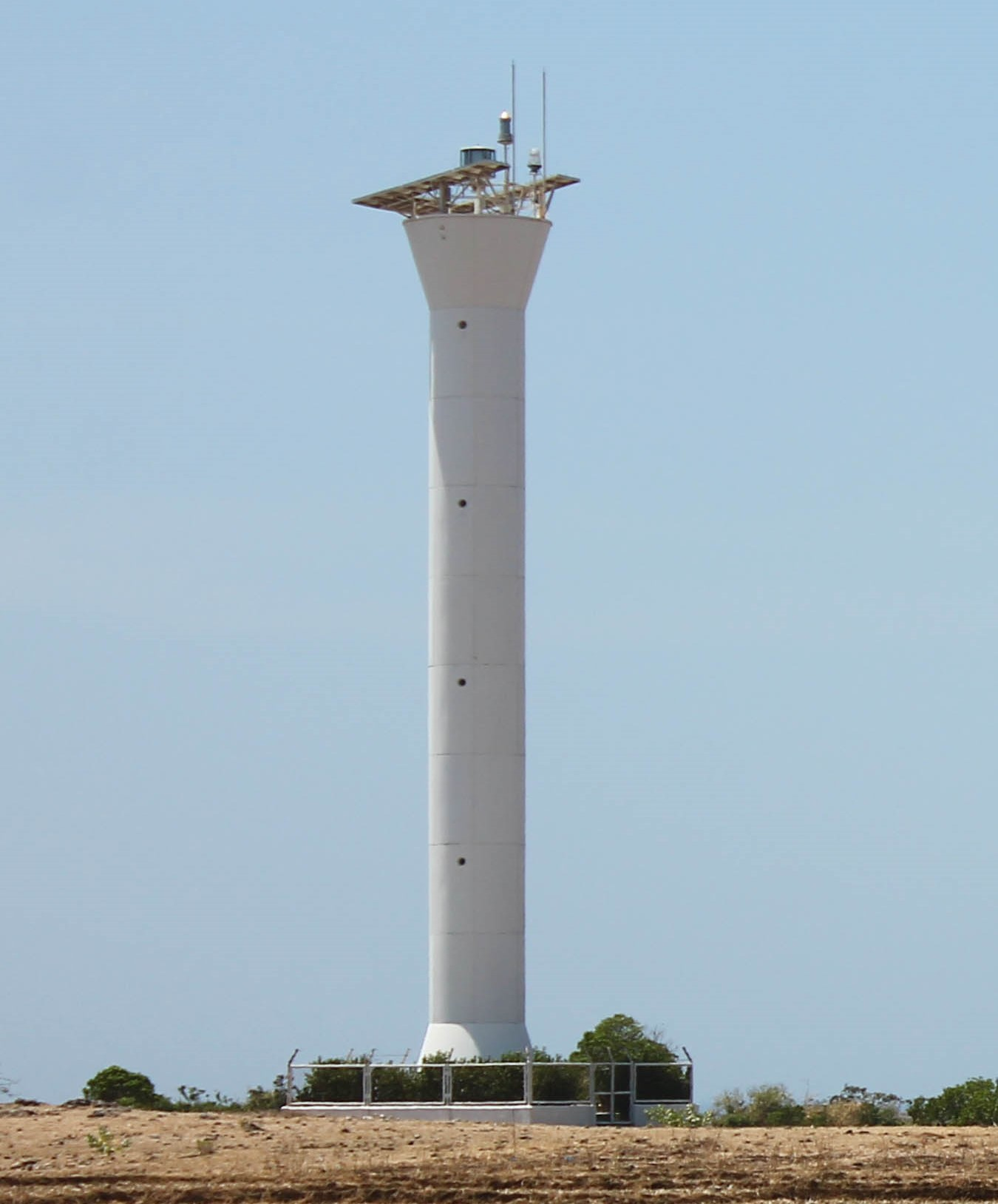
- Construction: concrete tower
- Height: 20 metres (66 ft)
- Shape: cylindrical tower with balcony and beacon
- Markings: white tower
- Power source: solar power

The Cabra Island Lighthouse is a historic lighthouse built on Cabra Island, the north-westernmost of the Lubang group of islands in Occidental Mindoro, Philippines. International vessels entering the Philippines from South China Sea were welcomed by the Cabra Light and directed either towards Manila Bay or the center of the archipelago through Verde Island Passage, one of busiest sea routes of the Philippines.

== History ==
The lighthouse of Cabra was the first completed during Spain's revitalized program of lighthouse construction in the Philippines. Construction was started on May 3, 1885, and it was first lit on March 1, 1889. It was also the first of the five first-order lighthouses built by the Spaniards in the latter part of their colonization of the archipelago.

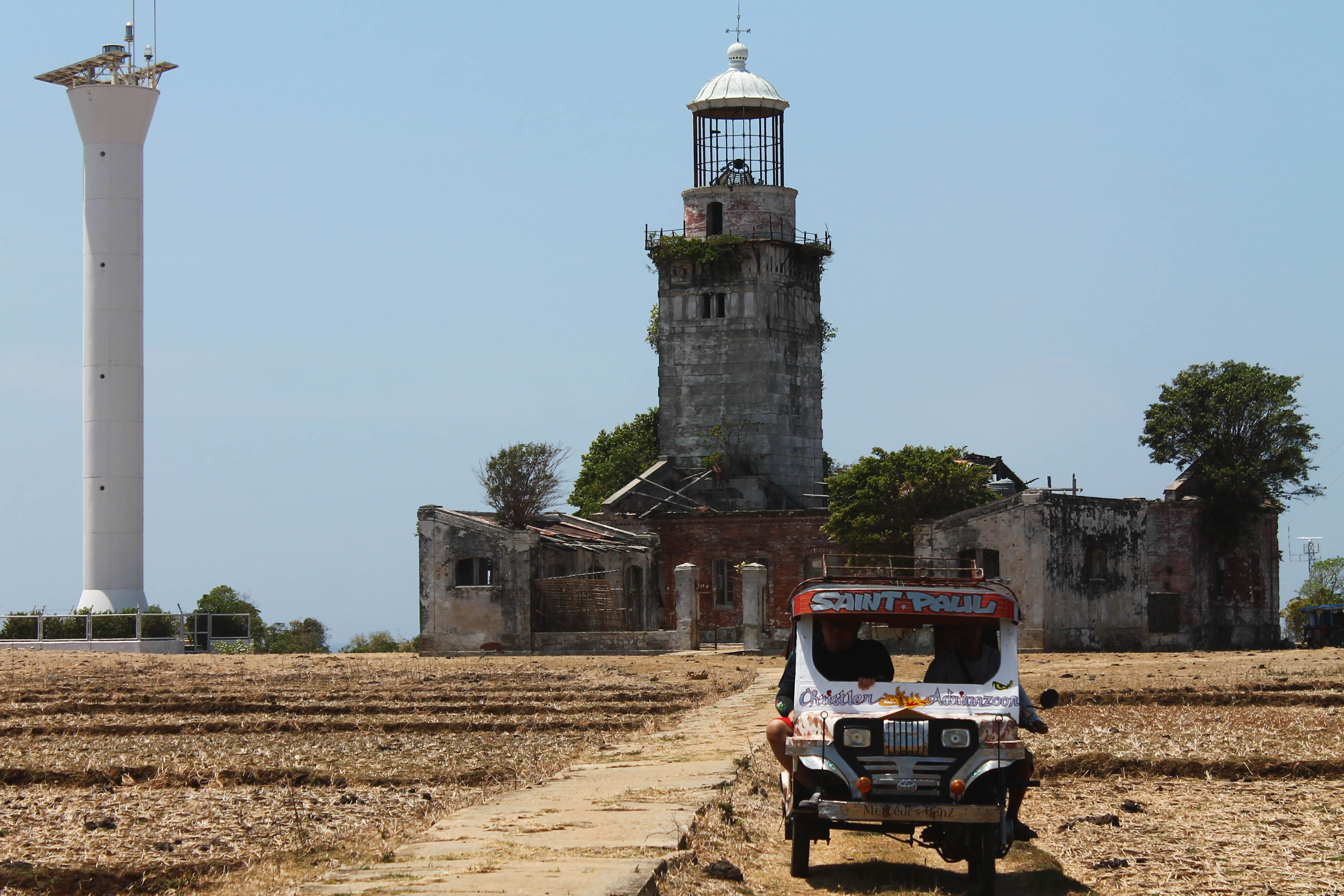
Cabra Island Lighthouse, March 2014

== Description ==
The original light, visible for 25 nautical miles (29 mi; 46 km), was shown from a 67-foot (20 m) high square tower on the west angle of the station. It is visible around the entire horizon except where obscured by Lubang and Ambil Islands.

== Current condition ==
The original lighthouse was replaced by the Philippine Coast Guard with a new solar-powered tower located next to the previous tower under its Maritime Safety Improvement Project. After the replacement, the lighthouse was abandoned and left open for thieves and vandals. The expensive first-order lens were vandalized with the large front Fresnel lenses all gone. The original bronze marker was stolen by thieves and has been replaced with a white board showing the original inscriptions. The roof of the keeper's house and utility rooms have collapsed. The lighthouse is closed to visitors due to its dilapidated state.

== See also ==
- List of lighthouses in the Philippines
