= Eureka (Gen Hoshino song) =

Single by Gen Hoshino

from the album Gen
- Language: Japanese
- Written: Late 2024–January 2025
- Released: January 28, 2025
- Studio: 808 (home studio)
- Genre: J-pop; soul
- Length: 3:31
- Label: Speedstar
- Songwriter: Gen Hoshino
- Producer: Gen Hoshino

Gen Hoshino singles chronology
"Why" / "Life" (2023)	"Eureka" (2025)	"Dead End" (2025)

Music video
- "Eureka" on YouTube

"Eureka" (Japanese pronunciation: [jɯɾꜜːka]) is a song by Japanese singer-songwriter and musician Gen Hoshino from his sixth studio album, Gen (2025). It was released digitally by Speedstar Records on January 28, 2025, as the seventh and last single from the album. As the theme song for the medical drama Diary of a Surgical Resident: Madoka (2025), Hoshino wrote and produced the track, which takes inspiration from the quiet storm genre and was composed largely within a day. A J-pop and soul ballad with simplistic progression, "Eureka" is about romance and city life. Hoshino sings about his lack of hope despite his despair, before he concludes that uncertainty should be used as a foothold to move forward.

Japanese music critics connected the song's lyrics to the modern way of life and commented on its composition, which two reviewers found simple but detailed. Commercially, "Eureka" reached number 11 on the weekly Billboard Japan Hot 100 and number 33 on the Oricon Combined Singles Chart. The song's music video is composed of scenes of Hoshino that were filmed over a one-week period. It was directed by the single's cover art photographer Kotori Kawashima and features a cameo from actor Taiga Nakano.

== Writing ==
As the theme song for the medical drama Diary of a Surgical Resident: Madoka (2025), Gen Hoshino began composing "Eureka" using digital audio workstations in late 2024. During production, the song carried the working title "Mountain" in reference to mountain ranges, which had inspired its soundscape. Hoshino conceived "Eureka" as a quiet storm-styled track—slow and mellow, influenced by genres such as soul and jazz. The intro, first verse, chorus, and the arrangement of various instruments were completed within a single day; according to Hoshino, the final track remains largely unchanged from this initial version.

Hoshino approached the song's lyrics, which were written shortly after the New Year, with the intent to create a personal song. On older works, a self-imposed rule prohibited Hoshino from writing about himself, but he wished to create more personal songs after first attempting this on the 2022 single "Comedy". He searched for similarities between his own philosophy and Surgical Resident: Madoka, and remarked on the song's background in a press comment. He recalled that when he was 26-years-old (the same age as the drama's protagonist), he had written a lyric that contained the word wakaranai (わからない; lit. 'I don't understand'). Retrospectively, he thought that he never had a moment of understanding/eureka.

== Composition ==
"Eureka" is 3 minutes and 31 seconds long. Hoshino produced and programmed the song, and plays bass and synthesizer; Shun Ishiwaka performs on drums and shaker, Hirotaka Sakurada plays standard and digital piano, and Ryosuke Nagaoka features on electric guitar. Hoshino handled recording with Shojiro Watanabe and Shu Saida. Watanabe mixed the song, while Takahiro Uchida mastered it.

"Eureka"
The transition into the song's first chorus, where synthesizer and guitar are added, and the lead vocals are doubled. A J-pop and soul ballad, one reviewer also observed elements of quiet storm, city pop, and album-oriented rock.

"Eureka" is a J-pop song above a repeating beat. It has a middle-tempo soul sound, which Ryūtarō Amano at Mikiki found to be in line with Hoshino's past works like "Comedy", "Ain't Nobody Know" (2019), "Fushigi" (2021), and "Why" (2023). A simplistic ballad without bold progression, "Eureka" is opened by Ishiwaka's shaker, which is accompanied by piano and drums starting with the first verse. Synthesizer and guitar are featured in the first chorus, where Hoshino's vocals are doubled and the polyphonic background vocals layered. The melody is led by the fusion-styled synth in the aftermath of the chorus, and the bass plays in the background throughout the song. Amano noted influences of quiet storm on the track; he compared its progression to the style of Grover Washington Jr.'s "Just the Two of Us" (1980), and its implementation of a shaker to Sade's "The Sweetest Taboo" (1985). Amano also noted similarities to city pop and album-oriented rock, and influences from Haruomi Hosono on Hoshino's bass.

The lyrics of "Eureka" are about city life and adult romance; Hoshino sings about the unknown, his lack of hope despite the existence of despair, and questions what can be found in a world without hope. Since he has continued to live, he concludes that hope is unnecessary and that uncertainty should be used as a foothold to move forward. He sings "The 'present' carries the past and future", and reflects on anxiety and emptiness in lines such as "I bested my sorrows / The fact I'm still breathing / Is proof of that". The pessimistic messages are contrasted by lines that suggest natural imagery: "The seasons dance, clad in the winds and reciting their poetry".

== Release and promotion ==
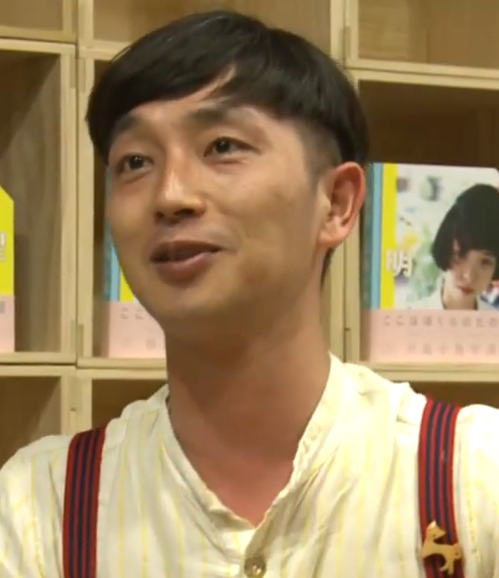
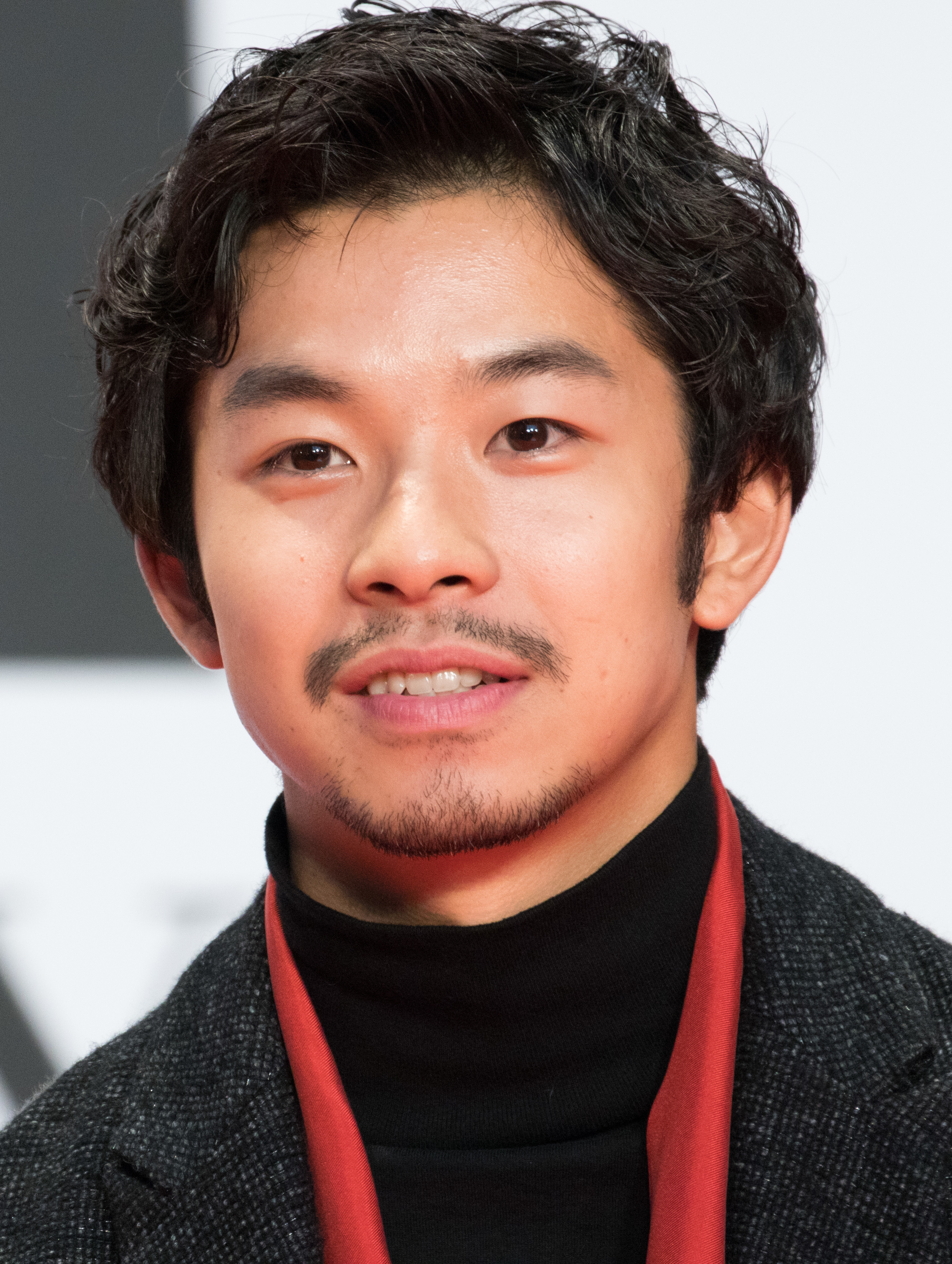
Cover photographer Kotori Kawashima (pictured left, 2015) directed and filmed the "Eureka" music video, which features a cameo by actor Taiga Nakano (right, 2016).

"Eureka" was first previewed in the first episode of Diary of a Surgical Resident: Madoka on January 14, 2025, before Speedstar Records released the song as a single for download and streaming on Hoshino's 44th birthday: January 28. The song's release was promoted with a teaser—a ten-second video clip posted to social media the morning before the premiere of Surgical Resident: Madoka, which featured the text "Gen Hoshino Eureka", played over by what Sports Bull writers called the percussive sound of maracas. The single's cover art, photographed by Kotori Kawashima and designed by Hiromi Fujita, depicts Hoshino covered by sunlight as he stares towards the sky. A phone wallpaper and messaging app stickers based on the artwork were awarded to users who pre-saved the song on streaming platforms. A promotional photo of Hoshino—also handled by Kawashima and Fujita—was unveiled alongside the song's announcement, and would later be used as the cover art for Hoshino's sixth studio album, Gen (2025). "Eureka" is the last single released for the album, on which it is the sixteenth and closing track.

Kawashima directed and filmed the "Eureka" music video, which was premiered to YouTube on January 31, 2025. Hoshino invited Kawashima to his studio during the writing of the song; in a one-week time span, they filmed some scenes there and others outside. A cameo appearance is made by actor Taiga Nakano, who meets with Hoshino over a cup of coffee. A behind-the-scenes video, directed and filmed by Koe Inc.'s Yosuke Yamaguchi, was released on March 5, 2025.

Hoshino first performed "Eureka" for a two-hour special of CDTV Live! Live! on February 10, 2025. A minimalistic live version of the song subtitled "808 Sessions"—featuring only Hoshino's soul vocals and digital piano by Hirotaka Sakurada—was uploaded on February 26. It was filmed at Hoshino's home studio 808, where the song and most of the Gen album were also recorded. Throughout mid-2025, "Eureka" was reprised as the final song before encore during the Japan leg of Gen's headlining tour, Gen Hoshino Presents Mad Hope.

== Reception ==
Japanese reviews of "Eureka" praised its lyrics; some critics particularly scored their relevance to modern life. Writing for Rockin'On Japan, Hirokazu Koike called "Eureka" a heart-warming song in contrast to the modern "storm of anxiety", and found the lyrics to almost inventively express overlookable truths. In Mikiki, Amano called the song's focus on darkness and despair a grounded form of realism, which he found more relevant to modern way of living in Japan, or the world as a whole, than "delusional hope". Musically, Suzie Suzuki for Yahoo! Japan News described "Eureka" as "pleasant" and "fresh". Amano considered the song a win for fans of Hoshino's musical transition towards middle-tempo soul, though he felt "Eureka" took an approach calmer than some of its preceding works. He found that the sound—a combination of a repeated beat, restrained vocals, and unglamorous progression—resulted in an "intimate" mood of city and night. Koike and Real Sound's Tomoyuki Mori considered the composition simple, but enjoyed Hoshino's attention to detail. "Eureka" was nominated for the Drama Song Award at the January–March 2025 The Television Drama Academy Awards. It was the fourth highest-voted song by The Television's journalists and readers, but failed to make the overall top three.

In its week of release, "Eureka" earned 9,440 paid digital downloads according to Billboard Japan, and 2,686,567 streams according to Oricon. The song entered at number 11 on the Billboard Japan Hot 100 dated February 5, 2025, and at number 33 on the Oricon Combined Singles Chart dated February 10. The track reached numbers 4 and 44 on Billboard Japan's download and streaming sub-charts, respectively. According to radio data surveyist Plantech, "Eureka" was the third most-aired song within its release week. Reporters for their website noted particularly strong performance in regards to listeners' requests, which was more than double of the total received by the other seven songs below it in that week's top ten.

== Credits and personnel ==
Music credits adapted from "Eureka" on Hoshino's official website, except where otherwise cited; visual personnel taken from video description on YouTube

Music and production

- Gen Hoshino – lead vocals, background vocals, bass, synthesizer, songwriting, production, arrangement, arrangement of choral vocals, programming, recording
- Shun Ishiwaka – drums, shaker
- Hirotaka Sakurada – piano, digital piano
- Ryosuke Nagaoka – electric guitar
- Shojiro Watanabe – recording, mixing
- Shu Saida – recording
- Takahiro Uchida – mastering
- Kotori Kawashima – cover photography
- Hiromi Fujita – cover design

Music video

- Kotori Kawashima – direction, videography, editing
- Shintaro Tamada – assistant direction, editing
- Yohei Kawada – creative direction, production
- Jin Otabe – assistant production
- Yosuke Yamaguchi (Koe Inc.) – behind-the-scenes videography
- Ryotaro Takahashi – online editing
- Matawe Wongpuak – online editing
- Tomokazu Saito – multi-audio engineer
- Hiromi Fujita – title design
- Dai Ishii – styling
- Shuto Sugiyama – assistant styling
- Rumi Hirose – hair-styling
- Miyuu Takeuchi – hair-styling
- Masaki Takahashi – hair-styling for Taiga
- Gen Hoshino – cast
- Taiga Nakano – cameo

== Charts ==
Weekly chart performance for "Eureka"
Chart (2025)	Peak position
Japan Hot 100 (Billboard Japan)	11
Japan Combined Singles (Oricon)	33

== Release history ==
Release date and formats for "Eureka"
Region	Date	Format(s)	Label	Ref.
Various	January 28, 2025	Digital download; streaming	Speedstar Records	
South Korea	January 28, 2025	Digital download; streaming	J-Box Entertainment	
