= 1982 Metro Manila Film Festival =

Film festival edition

- Date: December 25, 1982 to January 3, 1983
- Site: Manila

Highlights
- Best Picture: Himala
- Most awards: Himala (9)

Television coverage
- Network: MBS

The 8th Metro Manila Film Festival was held in 1982.

ECP's Himala captured nine awards in the 1982 Metro Manila Film Festival including the Best Picture, Best Director for Ishmael Bernal and Best Actress for Nora Aunor among others. The film also emerged the top grosser of the festival edging FPJ Productions' Ang Panday...Ikatlong Yugto.

== Entries ==
Title	Starring	Studio	Director	Genre
The Cute...The Sexy n' The Tiny	Bering Labra, Pia Moran, Weng Weng, Dencio Padilla, Beth Sandoval, Bonnie De Jesus	Liliw Films International	Pablo Vergara & Eddie Nicart	Comedy
Desire	Charito Solis, John Saxon, Tetchie Agbayani, Judith Chapman, Mark Gil	Hemisphere Pictures	Eddie Romero	Drama
Haplos	Vilma Santos, Christopher de Leon, Rio Locsin, Delia Razon, J. Eddie Infante, Rez Cortez, Juan Rodrigo	Mirick Films International	Antonio Jose Perez	Drama, Horror, Romance, Thriller
Himala	Nora Aunor, Spanky Manikan, Gigi Dueñas, Amable Quiambao, Vangie Labalan, Veronica Panlileo, Peng Medina	Experimental Cinema of the Philippines	Ishmael Bernal	Drama
Magindanao	Mohamad Faizal, Rhoy Flores, Rex Lapid, Charlie Davao, Philip Gamboa, Laarni Enriquez, Paquito Diaz, Romy Diaz, Dick Israel, Tony Carrion, Joaquin Fajardo, Willy Dado, Amay Bisaya, Max Alvarado	East West International Films	Diego Cagahastian	Action, War
Moral	Lorna Tolentino, Gina Alajar, Sandy Andolong, Anna Marin	Seven Stars Productions	Marilou Diaz-Abaya	Coming-of-age, Drama
Ang Panday: Ikatlong Yugto	Fernando Poe, Jr., Criselda 'Dang' Cecilio, Lito Anzures, Bentot, Jr.	FPJ Productions	Ronwaldo Reyes	Action, Adventure, Fantasy
Santa Claus is Coming to Town	Snooky Serna, Maricel Soriano, Gabby Concepcion, William Martinez, Albert Martinez, Robert Arevalo, Liza Lorena, Marissa Delgado, Raul Aragon, Alicia Alonzo, Mila Ocampo, Johnny Wilson, Joel Alano, Aiko Melendez, Kristine Garcia	Regal Films	Elwood Perez	Drama, Family, Romance
Tatlo Silang Tatay Ko	Tito Sotto, Vic Sotto, Joey de Leon, Susan Bautista, Panchito, Dely Atay-Atayan, Ike Lozada, German Moreno, Niño Muhlach	D'Wonder Films	J. Erastheo Navoa	Comedy
Tulisan ng Pasong Musang	Ramon Revilla, Susan Valdez, George Estregan, Paquito Diaz, Alicia Alonzo, Johnny Wilson, Janice Jurado	Lea Productions	Efren Pinon	Action

== Winners and nominees ==
=== Awards ===
Winners are listed first and highlighted in boldface.

Best Film	Best Director
**Himala**; Moral; Haplos	Ishmael Bernal – Himala
Best Actor	Best Actress
**Christopher de Leon – Haplos**	Nora Aunor – Himala
Best Supporting Actor	Best Supporting Actress
**Spanky Manikan – Himala**	Gigi Dueñas – Himala
Best Sound Engineering	Best Cinematography
**Rolly Ruta – Himala**	Sergio Lobo – Himala
Best Editing	Best Music
**Ike Jarlego, Jr. and Ben Pelayo – Himala**	Ernani Cuenco – Ang Panday: Ikatlong Yugto
Best Art Direction	Best Screenplay
**Raquel Villavicencio – Himala**	Ricky Lee – Moral

== Multiple awards ==
Awards	Film
9	Himala

== Commentary ==
=== Second Golden Age of Philippine film ===
The period of the Philippine film's artistic accomplishment begins in 1975 (three years after Ferdinand Marcos' declaration of Martial Law) and ending in the February 1986 People Power Revolution where Marcos lost his power. Nora Aunor's Bona and Himala in 1980 and 1982 respectively (both are official entries of MMFF) achieves to represent the period where the accomplishments of two government institutions contributed to the emergence of New Cinema in the 1970s and 1980s. Her films are cinematically accomplished despite being politically engaged films, and the MMFF is able to make these films flourish during this period.

Preceded by 1981 Metro Manila Film Festival	Metro Manila Film Festival; 1982	Succeeded by 1983 Metro Manila Film Festival
