= Spanky Manikan =

Filipino theatre, film and television actor (1942-2018)

- Born: Manuel S. Manikan; March 22, 1942; Manila, Philippine Commonwealth
- Died: January 14, 2018 (aged 75); Manila, Philippines
- Occupation: Actor
- Years active: 1970–2018
- Spouse: Susan Africa (m. 1989)
- Children: 3 (including Migo Manikan )

Manuel S. Manikan (March 22, 1942 – January 14, 2018), known professionally as Spanky Manikan, was a Filipino theater, film and television actor.

In 1981, Manikan won Best Supporting Actor awards from the Metro Manila Film Festival and the Catholic Mass Media Awards for his role in the 1982 film Himala. He was also awarded the Best Supporting Actor for GMA's Bahaghari Awards for the tele-movie Parola in 1995. In 2014, Manikan was nominated by the PMPC Star Awards as Best Supporting Actor for Bamboo Flowers. On December 1, 2014, he was awarded the Best Actor (Non-Musical) by the Aliw Awards for his portrayal of Zacarias Monzon in Tanghalang Pilipino's Mga Ama Mga Anak .

== Career ==
He began his theater career with the Philippine Educational Theater Association (PETA) in the production Halimaw in 1972. Since then, he had acted with Dulaang UP, Manila Metropolitan Theater, Bulwagang Gantimpala and Tanghalang Pilipino of the Cultural Center of the Philippines (CCP). He also played roles in Kabesang Tales, Joe Hill, The Caucasian Chalk Circle, Rehas Sa Tubig, Solo Entre Las Sombras, General Goyo, The Boor, Henry IV (Pirandello), Mando Plaridel, Canuplin, Marat Sade, Kang Tse, Bombita, Pilipinas Circa 1900, Bien Aligtad, Puntila and Matti, Pantaglieze, The Iceman Cometh, Maliw and Mga Ama Mga Anak.

Manikan's filmography consists of local and international productions, with roles in Lino Brocka's Maynila sa Kuko Ng Liwanag and Bona, and Ishmael Bernal's Broken Marriage and Himala. He went on to work with American and European directors in Behind Enemy Lines, Saigon Commandos, HBO's A Dangerous Life, Le Zhan Chang An, In Naam der Koningin, Tatort-Manila, Au Bout De Rouleau, and Amigo.

== Health and death ==
In August 2017, Manikan was diagnosed with stage-4 lung cancer.

On January 14, 2018, Manikan died due to lung cancer, at the age of 75.

== Theatre ==
- (2014) Mga Ama Mga Anak, as Zacarias Monzon, Tanghalang Pilipino, Cultural Center of the Philippines (CCP)
- (2013) Maliw, Tanghalang Pilipino, Cultural Center of the Philippines (CCP)
- (2000) The Iceman Cometh; University of the Philippines Repertory (UP)
- (1998) Pantaglieze, as Judge, Cultural Center of the Philippines (CCP)
- (1995) Taos, as Cult Leader (1987); Puntila and Matti (Brecht), as Matti (lead), Cultural Center of the Philippines (CCP); The Police, as Chief of Police, Cultural Center of the Philippines (CCP)
- (1986) Luwalhati sa Kaitaasan, as Fanatic (lead), Cultural Center of the Philippines (CCP)
- (1985) Bien Aligtad, as Takyong Bagting, Cultural Center of the Philippines (CCP); Three Penny Opera, as MacKieth (lead), Cultural Center of the Philippines (CCP)
- (1982) The Importance of Being Earnest, as Ernest Worthing, Cultural Center of the Philippines (CCP); Pilipinas Circa 1900, as Andres (lead), Philippine Educational Theater Association (PETA)
- (1981) The Weavers, as Jaeger, Cultural Center of the Philippines (CCP); Bombita, as Nestor, Cultural Center of the Philippines (CCP); Kang Tse, as Kang Tse, Cultural Center of the Philippines (CCP)
- (1980) Marat Sade, as Jean Paul Marat, UP Theater; Canuplin, as Blas, Philippine Educational Theater Association (PETA); Mando Plaridel, as Mando Plaridel, Cultural Center of the Philippines (CCP); Henry IV (Pirandello), as Henry IV, UP Theater; The Boor, as Smirnoff, Cultural Center of the Philippines (CCP); Bent, UP
- (1979) Salubong, Cultural Center of the Philippines (CCP); General Goyo, as General Goyo, Cultural Center of the Philippines (CCP); Solo entre las sombras, Metropolitan Theater; Rehas sa Tubig, MET
- (1978) Caucasian Chalk Circle, as the narrator, Philippine Educational Theater Association (PETA); Joe Hill, as Joe Hill, Philippine Educational Theater Association (PETA); Juan Tamban, Philippine Educational Theater Association (PETA)
- (1975) Kabesang Tales, Philippine Educational Theater Association (PETA); Antigone, as Creon, Philippine Educational Theater Association (PETA); Alitan sa Venetia, as Bepe, Philippine Educational Theater Association (PETA)
- (1972) Halimaw, as Activist, Philippine Educational Theater Association (PETA); Godspell, as Clown, Philippine Educational Theater Association (PETA)

== Filmography ==
=== Film ===
- 1975 - Manila in the Claws of Light
- 1980 - Bona
- 1982 - Himala
- 1983 - Broken Marriage
- 1986 - P.O.W. The Escape - NVA officer
- 1986 - Saigon Commandos
- 1989 - Fatal Vacation
- 1991 - B-Team
- 1992 - Divide by Two
- 1995 - In Naam der Koningin
- 1997 - Behind Enemy Lines - General Nguy
- 1998 - Tatort-Manila
- 1999 - Bullet - General
- 2000 - Buhay Kamao
- 2001 - Mananabas - Gen. Tomas Roxas
- 2001 - Deathrow - Fajardo
- 2002 - Au bout de Rouleau
- 2008 - Ploning - Tsuy
- 2010 - Amigo
- 2011 - Forever and a Day - Eugene's dad
- 2012 - The Strangers
- 2013 - Alfredo S. Lim (The Untold Story)
- 2013 - Bamboo Flowers
- 2014 - Alienasyon
- 2016 - Piding
- 2017 - Carlo J. Caparas' Ang Panday

=== Television ===
Year	Title	Role
1988	A Dangerous Life	Ramon
2001	Sa Dulo ng Walang Hanggan	Don Sebastian
2002	Kung Mawawala Ka	Gen. Gonzalo
2003	Darating ang Umaga	Ramon Reverente
2004	Krystala	George
2006	Majika	Carab
2007	Ysabella	Perry Mendoza
2007	Zaido: Pulis Pangkalawakan	Doctor Eng
2008	Lobo	Crisostomo Silva / Alberto Dela Rama
2009	Tayong Dalawa	Stanley King
2010	May Bukas Pa	Milo
2010	Precious Hearts Romances Presents: Midnight Phantom	Don Hernando
2010	Noah	Ernie
2011	Sabel	Tino
2011	Amaya	Datu Bulang
2011	Daldalita	Dr. Manny Manuel
2012	Walang Hanggan	Hernan Cardenas
2012	Princess and I	King Chen Mo
2012	Lorenzo's Time	Luis Robles
2012	Kidlat	Tata Domeng
2013	Honesto	Felipe Lualhati
2014	Ikaw Lamang	Damian Severino
2015	Pari 'Koy	Don Manuel Evangelista
2016	Ipaglaban Mo!	Mr. Teng
2016	FPJ's Ang Probinsyano	Tatay Estong
2017	My Love from the Star	Juan "Jang" Avanado his last tv appearance

== Awards ==
Year	Group	Category	Work	Result
1982	Metro Manila Film Festival	Best Supporting Actor	Himala	Won
1983	Catholic Mass Media Awards	Best Supporting Actor	Himala	Won
