= The Twilight World =

2021 book by Werner Herzog

- Author: Werner Herzog
- Original title: Das Dämmern der Welt
- Translator: Michael Hofmann
- Language: German
- Genre: Non-fiction novel
- Publisher: Hanser Verlag
- Publication date: 2021
- Publication place: Germany
- English publication date: 2022
- Pages: 144
- ISBN: 9781529116243

The Twilight World (German: Das Dämmern der Welt) is a book written by Werner Herzog. It was published in German by Hanser in 2021. The English translation by Michael Hofmann was published by Bodley Head in 2022. The book is based on the life of Hiroo Onoda, a Japanese soldier, stationed in Lubang during World War II, who refused to surrender until 1974.

== Background ==
Except for The Twilight World, books published by Herzog have been diaries (Of Walking in Ice, Die Eroberung des Nutzlosen) and a memoir (Every Man for Himself and God against All, 2022). Although based on real events, The Twilight World is the first of his books not focused on Herzog's personal experience; it may be considered his first novel.

The book opens by a preamble in which Herzog recalls how he met Onoda in real life in 1997 in Tokyo.

== Reception ==
The book has received positive critical response, with reviews in Die Zeit, The New York Times (that dedicated two articles to the publication), The Wall Street Journal and The Guardian, among others. A review in Die Welt, however, found that "sentimentality was never far from this story", regretting the lack of ethic distance from Onoda's deeds during the war, but adding: "So poetry is reactionary. And yet remains breathtakingly poetic."

== Theatrical adaptation ==
The Twilight World was adapted for the stage by Lili Riesenbeck. It was performed at the Schauspiel Köln in February 2023, directed by Michael Königstein, with Kei Muramoto portraying Onoda.
