= Cabra, Lubang =

Cabra
- Barangay
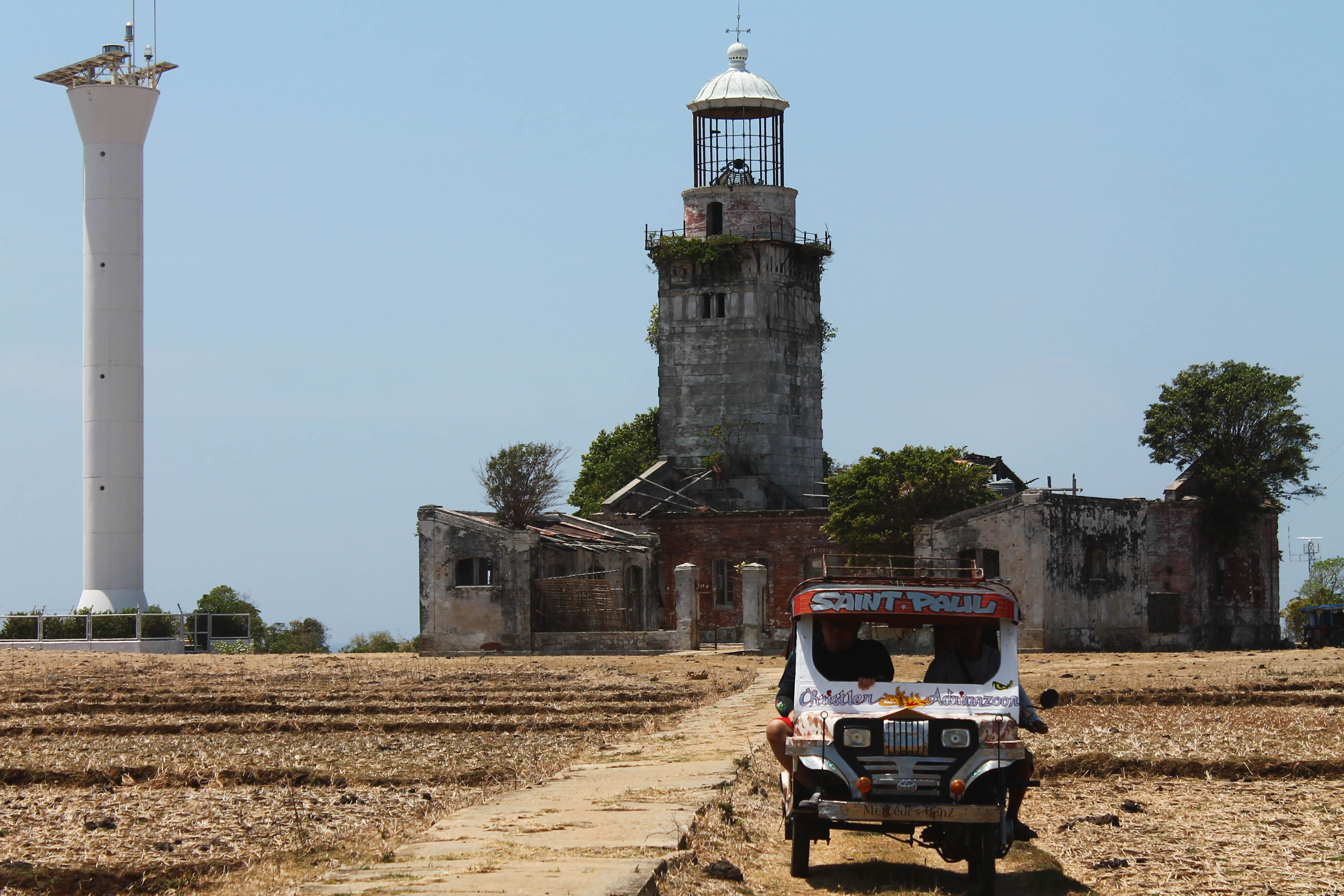
- The Cabra Island Lighthouse in March 2014
- Interactive map of Cabra
- Location within Luzon Location within Philippines
- Coordinates: 13°53′N 120°02′E
- Country: Philippines
- Region: Mimaropa
- Province: Occidental Mindoro
- Municipality: Lubang

Government
  - Type: Barangay

Population (2020)
  - Total: 1,231
- Time zone: UTC+8 (PST)

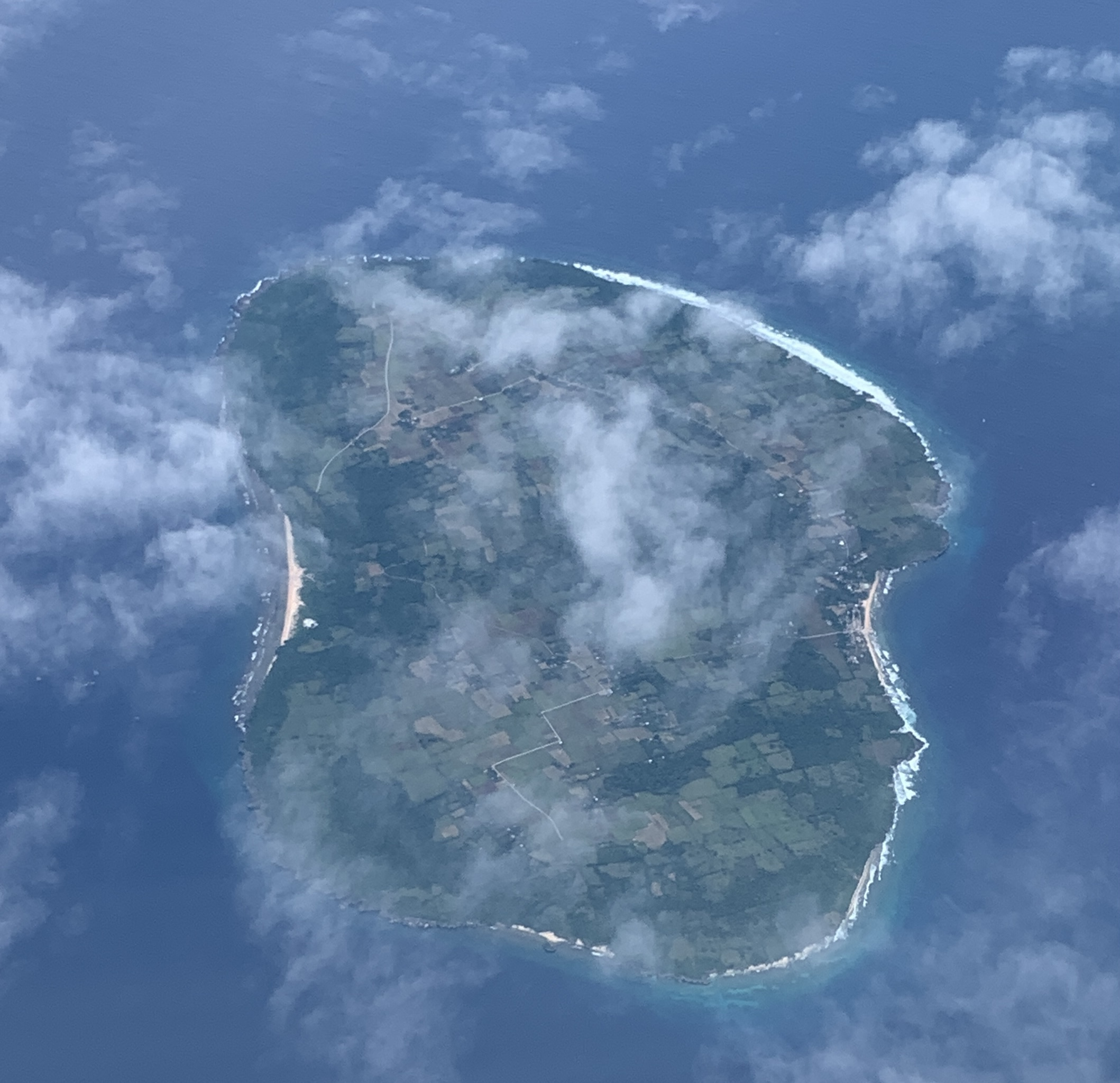
Cabra Island

Cabra is a barangay in the Philippines that covers the island of the same name. The island is the north-westernmost of the Lubang Group of Islands in the Verde Island Passage southwest of the country's main island of Luzon and northwest of the island of Mindoro. The barangay is administered as part of the municipality of Lubang, Occidental Mindoro.

== Geography ==
With a length of about 4.5 km (2.8 miles) and about 2.9 km (1.8 miles) at its widest, the island has a flat terrain with the highest elevation at 60.96 metres (around 200 feet). A particular rock islet near one beach is considered by locals as a symbol of the island given its shape as a cabra (Spanish for “goat”). The Cabra Island Lighthouse complex is located on Cabra Island.

=== Formation ===
Cabra Island may have formed from a gigantic coral reef. (Note: "From Hulagaan, it takes about an hour of cruising westward to reach Cabra Island, which is said to have been formed from a huge coral reef.")

== History ==
The community in Cabra was established by the Spaniards in 1885, the year they started building the Cabra Island Lighthouse. It was named Cabra (Spanish for “goat”) after the Spaniards saw herds of goats when they landed.

From 1966 to 1972, a handful of schoolgirls on the island reported experiencing visions of the Blessed Virgin Mary. The purported apparitions, unofficially known by the title of Our Lady of Cabra Island, eventually inspired the 1982 Ishmael Bernal drama film Himala, starring Nora Aunor.

== Cabra Island Lighthouse ==
The Cabra Island Lighthouse complex is situated about 656 yards (600 m.) from the west end of the island. Construction on the lighthouse began on May 3, 1885, and it was first lit on March 1, 1889. The lighthouse is closed to visitors due to its dilapidated state.

== See also ==
- Our Lady of Cabra Island
- List of islands of the Philippines
