= Onoda: 10,000 Nights in the Jungle =

2021 war drama film

- French theatrical release poster
- French: Onoda, 10 000 nuits dans la jungle
- Directed by: Arthur Harari
- Written by: Arthur Harari; Vincent Poymiro; Bernard Cendron (collaboration)
- Produced by: Nicolas Anthomé
- Starring: Yuya Endo; Kanji Tsuda; Yuya Matsuura; Tetsuya Chiba; Shinsuke Kato; Kai Inowaki; Issey Ogata; Taiga Nakano; Nobuhiro Suwa; Mutsuo Yoshioka; Tomomitsu Adachi; Kyusaku Shimada; Angeli Bayani; Jemuel Cedrick Satumba
- Cinematography: Tom Harari
- Edited by: Laurent Sénéchal
- Music by: Sebastiano De Gennaro; Enrico Gabrielli; Andrea Poggio; Gak Sato; Olivier Marguerit
- Production companies: Bathysphere; TBC
- Distributed by: Le Pacte (France); Imagine (Belgium); Elephant House (Japan); REM (Germany); Westec Media Limited (Cambodia)
- Release dates: 7 July 2021 (Cannes); 21 July 2021 (France); 11 August 2021 (Belgium); 8 October 2021 (Japan); 2 June 2022 (Germany)
- Running time: 167 minutes
- Countries: France; Japan; Germany; Belgium; Italy; Cambodia
- Languages: Japanese; Filipino
- Box office: $193,000–$261,000 (France)

Onoda: 10,000 Nights in the Jungle (Japanese: ONODA 一万夜を越えて, Hepburn: Onoda: Ichiman'ya o Koete; lit."Onoda: Over ten thousand nights", French: Onoda, 10 000 nuits dans la jungle) is a 2021 war drama film directed by Arthur Harari and co-written with Vincent Poymiro, with the collaboration of Bernard Cendron. It is inspired by the life of Hiroo Onoda (Yuya Endo) a Japanese soldier who refused to believe that World War II had ended and continued to fight on a remote Philippine island until 1974.

It is an international co-production between France, Japan, Germany, Belgium, Italy, and Cambodia. The film was particularly inspired by Cendron and Gérard Chenu's 1974 biography Onoda, seul en guerre dans la jungle, Cendron's archives, and Harari's conversations with the author. Harari did not base it on Onoda's own memoir; he considers the film to be fiction inspired by history rather than a biopic.

The film had its world premiere at the Un Certain Regard section of the 2021 Cannes Film Festival, on 7 July 2021. It was theatrically released in France on 21 July 2021, and in Japan on 8 October 2021. It was received with critical acclaim, winning Best Original Screenplay at the 47th César Awards.

== Cast ==
- Yuya Endo as young Hiroo Onoda
- Kanji Tsuda as old Hiroo Onoda
- Yuya Matsuura as young Kinshichi Kozuka
- Tetsuya Chiba as old Kinshichi Kozuka
- Shinsuke Kato as Shimada
- Kai Inowaki as Akatsu
- Issey Ogata as Major Taniguchi
- Taiga Nakano as Norio Suzuki
- Nobuhiro Suwa as Tanejirō Onoda
- Mutsuo Yoshioka as Captain Hayakawa
- Tomomitsu Adachi as Second Kuroda
- Kyusaku Shimada as Lieutenant Suehiro
- Angeli Bayani as Iniez
- Jemuel Cedrick Satumba as the Filipino prisoner

== Release ==
The film opened the Un Certain Regard section of the 2021 Cannes Film Festival on 7 July 2021.

It was released in cinemas in the United Kingdom and Ireland by Third Window Films on 15 April 2022.

=== Critical reception ===
On the review aggregator website Rotten Tomatoes, 97% of 35 critics' reviews are positive, with an average rating of 7.70/10. The website's consensus reads: "With absorbing patience and palpable empathy, Onoda: 10,000 Nights in the Jungle finds poignant drama in one real-life soldier's stubborn pursuit of honor." Metacritic, which uses a weighted average, assigned the film a score of 78 out of 100, based on 12 critics, indicating "generally favorable" reviews.

On RogerEbert.com, Ben Kenigsburg writes: "Technically, "Onoda"... is a biopic, but it never plays like one. This austere, bleak, occasionally even darkly funny film is, at nearly three hours, more like an absurdist slow burn." James Lattimer, writing for Sight and Sound, called it "...a nearly three-hour wannabe existentialist war drama intended as an exercise in the sort of big-screen immersion that has been impossible of late... [T]he film's humdrum dramatization lacks the necessary visual or narrative finesse to keep viewers absorbed."

== Accolades ==
The film won the Prix Louis-Delluc for 2021. At the 11th Magritte Awards, it received a nomination in the category of Best Foreign Film in Coproduction.
