= Norio Suzuki (explorer) =

Japanese explorer and adventurer (1949–1986)

- 鈴木 紀夫
- Suzuki (left) and Hiroo Onoda, in February 1974 on Lubang Island. The image was intended to be proof that Onoda was alive
- Born: April 1949; Chiba, Japan
- Died: November 1986 (aged 37); Himalaya mountains
- Cause of death: Avalanche
- Education: Hosei University
- Occupations: Explorer, traveler
- Known for: Finding Hiroo Onoda

Norio Suzuki (鈴木 紀夫, Suzuki Norio; April 1949 – November 1986) was a Japanese explorer and adventurer. In 1974 he searched for and found Hiroo Onoda, one of the last remaining Japanese holdouts who had refused to surrender after the end of World War II. Suzuki died in November 1986 in an avalanche while searching for the yeti.

== Early years ==
Suzuki was born in Chiba and lived in Ichihara. He studied economics at Hosei University, but dropped out and decided to explore the world. He toured Asia, the Middle East and Africa. In 1972, after four years of wandering the world, he decided to return to Japan and found himself surrounded by what he felt as "fake".

== Search for Hiroo Onoda ==
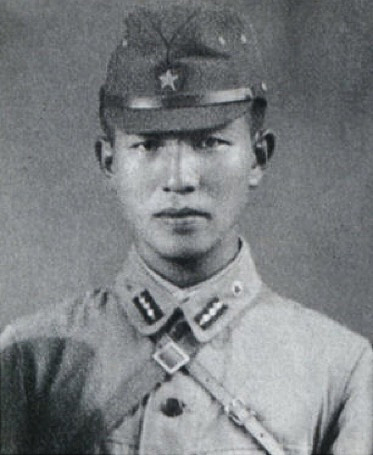
Hiroo Onoda

The Japanese media reported that a Japanese imperial soldier, Kinshichi Kozuka, was shot to death on an island in the Philippines on October 19, 1972. Kozuka had been part of a guerilla "cell" originally consisting of himself and three other soldiers; of the four, Yuichi Akatsu had slipped away in 1949 and surrendered to what he thought were Allied soldiers; approximately five years later, Shōichi Shimada was killed in a shootout with a local patrol on the beach at Gontin. Hiroo Onoda had long since been declared dead, the Japanese authorities assuming that he and Kozuka could not have survived all these years in the jungle; they were forced to re-think this when Kozuka's body was returned to Japan. This prompted a series of search efforts to find Lt. Onoda, all of which ended in failure.

Suzuki then decided to search for the officer. He expressed his decision in this way: He wanted to search for "Lieutenant Onoda, a panda, and the Abominable Snowman, in that order".

In February 1974, Suzuki encountered Onoda, who was wearing a tattered military uniform on Lubang Island in the Philippines. He had survived a solitary life for two years after he lost the last of his two colleagues. When Onoda was first discovered, he was ready to shoot Suzuki at first sight, but fortunately, Suzuki had read all about the fugitive and quickly said: "Onoda-san, the Emperor and the people of Japan are worried about you." Onoda described this moment in a 2010 interview: "This hippie boy Suzuki came to the island to listen to the feelings of a Japanese soldier. Suzuki asked me why I would not come out..."

Onoda refused to be relieved of his duties unless officially ordered to do so. After extended conversations, Onoda agreed to wait for Suzuki to return with his former commanding officer (who was now an old man working in a bookstore) to give him further orders. Onoda said, "I am a soldier and remain true to my duties."

In March 1974, Suzuki returned with Onoda's former commander, who officially relieved him of his duties. He turned over his sword, a functioning Arisaka Type 99 rifle, 500 rounds of ammunition and several hand grenades, as well as the dagger his mother had given him in 1944 to kill himself with if he was captured. Then he surrendered, was pardoned by Philippine President Ferdinand Marcos, and became free to return to Japan.

== Death ==
After finding Onoda, Suzuki quickly found a wild panda, and claimed to have spotted a yeti from a distance by July 1975, hiking in the Dhaulagiri range of the Himalayas. He married in 1976 but did not give up his quest.

Suzuki died in November 1986 in an avalanche while searching for the yeti. His remains were discovered a year later and returned to his family.

== Bibliography ==
- Echigoya, Kōji (1992). Bōkenka no tamashii: Onoda moto Shōi hakkensha Suzuki Norio no shōgai. Kōfusha Shuppan. ISBN 978-4-87519-753-9. OCLC 28028441.
