= Lubang Island =

Largest island in the Lubang Group of Islands

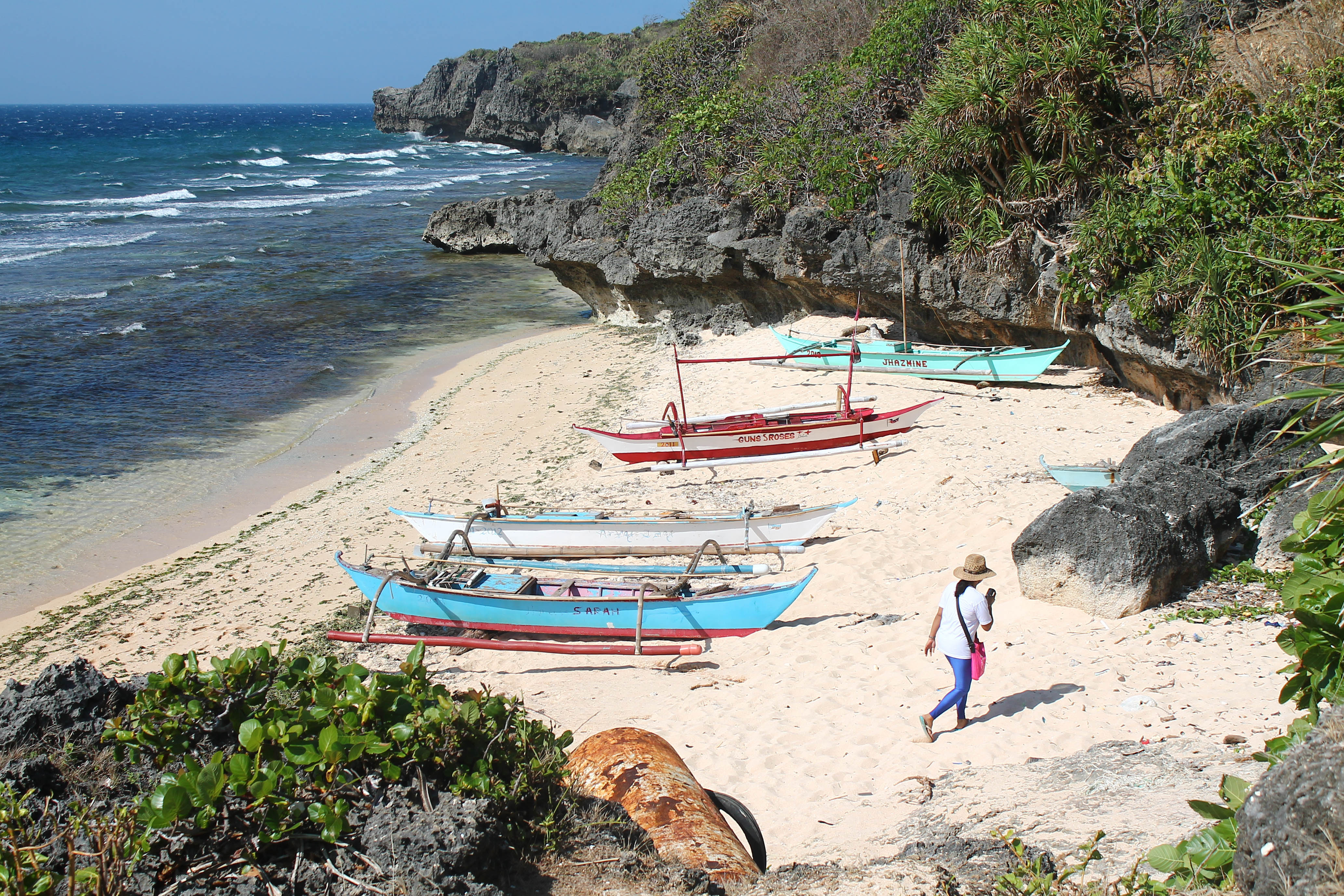
- One of the beaches on Lubang island

- Location within Philippines

Geography
- Coordinates: 13°46′3″N 120°11′10″E
- Archipelago: Lubang Group of Islands
- Adjacent to: South China Sea; Verde Island Passage
- Area: 125 km^{2} (48 sq mi)
- Highest elevation: 610 m (2000 ft)
- Highest point: Mount Ambonong

Administration
- Philippines
- Region: Mimaropa
- Province: Occidental Mindoro
- Municipalities: Lubang; Looc

Demographics
- Population: 20,436 (as of 2020)

Additional information

Lubang Island is the largest among the seven islands in the Lubang Group of Islands, an archipelago situated to the northwest of the northern tip of the island of Mindoro in the Philippines. It is positioned approximately 40 kilometers (25 mi) west of Calatagan, Batangas, or 117 kilometers (73 mi) southwest of Manila. The Lubang Group of Islands is under the jurisdiction of the province of Occidental Mindoro and divided into two municipalities. The principal settlement is the town of Lubang, located at the northwest section and about 11 kilometers (6.8 mi) northwest of Tilik Port. The southeastern portion of the Lubang Island falls within the municipality of Looc, which also operates a port in a different area, specifically in Barangay Agkawayan. Lubang Group of Islands stands as a distinct geographical entity isolated from any landmass, rendering it biologically unique and also endangered.

== Geography ==
Northwest to southeast the four main islands are Cabra, separated by a deep, 3-kilometre (1.9 mi) wide channel from Lubang Island, then Ambil to the northeast of Lubang and finally Golo. The three smaller islands are Talinas, Mandaui and Malavatuan.

- Cabra, which is wholly under the barangay also named Cabra in the municipality of Lubang, is mostly wooded and about 3 kilometres (1.9 mi) long, rising to a height of about 60 metres (200 ft). It has a lighthouse at the northwest end of the island.
- Lubang Island is about 250 square kilometres (97 sq mi), being over 25 kilometres (16 mi) in length and up to 10 kilometres (6.2 mi) wide. It is the 34th largest island in the Philippine archipelago.
- Ambil is an extinct volcanic island rising to over 760 metres (2,490 ft) and is about 26 square kilometres (10 sq mi) in area. During the earlier part of the Spanish Colonial Era, Ambil was reported to be in eruption. But when it was climbed by German scientist Carl Semper in the latter part of 19th century, he found no evidence that it has erupted in historical times. It is the 93rd largest island in the Philippine archipelago. Together with the two smaller islands of Mandaui and Malavatuan, Ambil is administered under the barangay also named Ambil in the municipality of Looc.
- Golo Island is long, narrow and flat lying, and is about 26 square kilometres (10 sq mi) in area. It is divided into two barangays of Looc: Bulacan and Talaotao.

== History ==
The islands were originally settled by a proto-ethnic group that eventually developed into the present-day Tagalog. The island people of Lubang were among the first in the Philippines to have trade contacts with Chinese traders, as the island was an entry point to what the Chinese then referred as "Ma-i" in their trade records.

The Spanish built a fort on Lubang Island, the San Vicente Bastion, on the western point of the entrance to Tilik Port. In the late 19th century, the United States annexed the Philippines following the Spanish-American War.

After World War II, Lubang Island was where Hiroo Onoda, a Japanese army intelligence officer, and three associates hid in the jungles when the Allies reclaimed the Philippines. They engaged in continuous, and sometimes deadly, guerrilla warfare against the United States and later against Philippine Commonwealth troops and paramilitary police. One of the others surrendered, and two were killed over the decades. Although official flyers were dropped by airplanes in his hiding area, Onoda adamantly believed that the war was not over yet. In March 1974, he was officially relieved of duty by his former commanding officer, 29 years after the end of the war, making him one of the last Japanese soldiers to surrender.

Two films, Onoda's War (2016), shot around Vigo, Burol, Agkawayan and Looc, and Onoda: 10,000 Nights in the Jungle (2021) are about Onoda's time on Lubang. In addition, Werner Herzog wrote a novel about it, The Twilight World.

== Administration ==
The islands are administratively part of the province of Occidental Mindoro and are divided into two municipalities: Lubang and Looc. Lubang covers the northwestern half of Lubang Island (Cabra Island included), while Looc covers the remaining half of Lubang Island plus Ambil, Golo and the other islands. Looc Proper is divided into three major sections: Bonbon, Guitna and Kanluran.

== Economics ==
Most of the population resides on Lubang Island, where Tilik Port is located. The main economic activity is fishing in the waters surrounding the islands and planting rice, garlic, peanut, and vegetables. However, with the islands fine white-sand coastlines, tourism is growing in economic importance.

== Biodiversity ==
=== Mammals ===
The Lubang forest mouse (Apomys lubangensis) is a species of rodent endemic to Lubang Islands, Philippines.

The population of warty pigs (Sus spp) in the Lubang Islands might represent distinct population. Research in their Morphology and Phylogentic is required to verify their lineages.

=== Reptiles ===
The Lubang scaly-toed gecko (Lepidodactylus nakahiwalay) is a species of lizard in the Gekkonidae family endemic to Lubang Islands, Philippines.

The Lubang slender skink (Brachymeles ligtas) is a species of lizard in the Scincidae family endemic to Lubang Islands, Philippines.

The Lubang Islands in the Philippines is also home to the Philippine Cobra (Naja philippinensis) and record of King Cobra species (Ophiophagus spp.)

They were formerly found in most habitats (from sea level to up to 2800 m) but is now confined to remote forests due to loss of habitat and heavy hunting by noose traps or trigger set bullets. The island is also home to a variety of myxomycetes or slime molds, Some of the birds that can be found in the island include the oriental dwarf kingfisher, glossy swiftlet, mangrove blue flycatcher, white-throated kingfisher, Philippine bulbul, black-naped monarch, rufous paradise flycatcher, purple-throated sunbird, and lovely sunbird, among others. The islands are also home to many insect species, some of which were recently identified. The waters of Lubang island and its outlying islands are also biodiverse. The islands converge with the Verde Island Passage.

== See also ==
- Hiroo Onoda, an imperial Japanese soldier in military campaign hiding out on Lubang Island from 1945 until 1974, believing World War II had not ended.
