= Lubang, Occidental Mindoro =

Municipality in Occidental Mindoro, Philippines

Lubang
- Municipality
- Municipality of Lubang
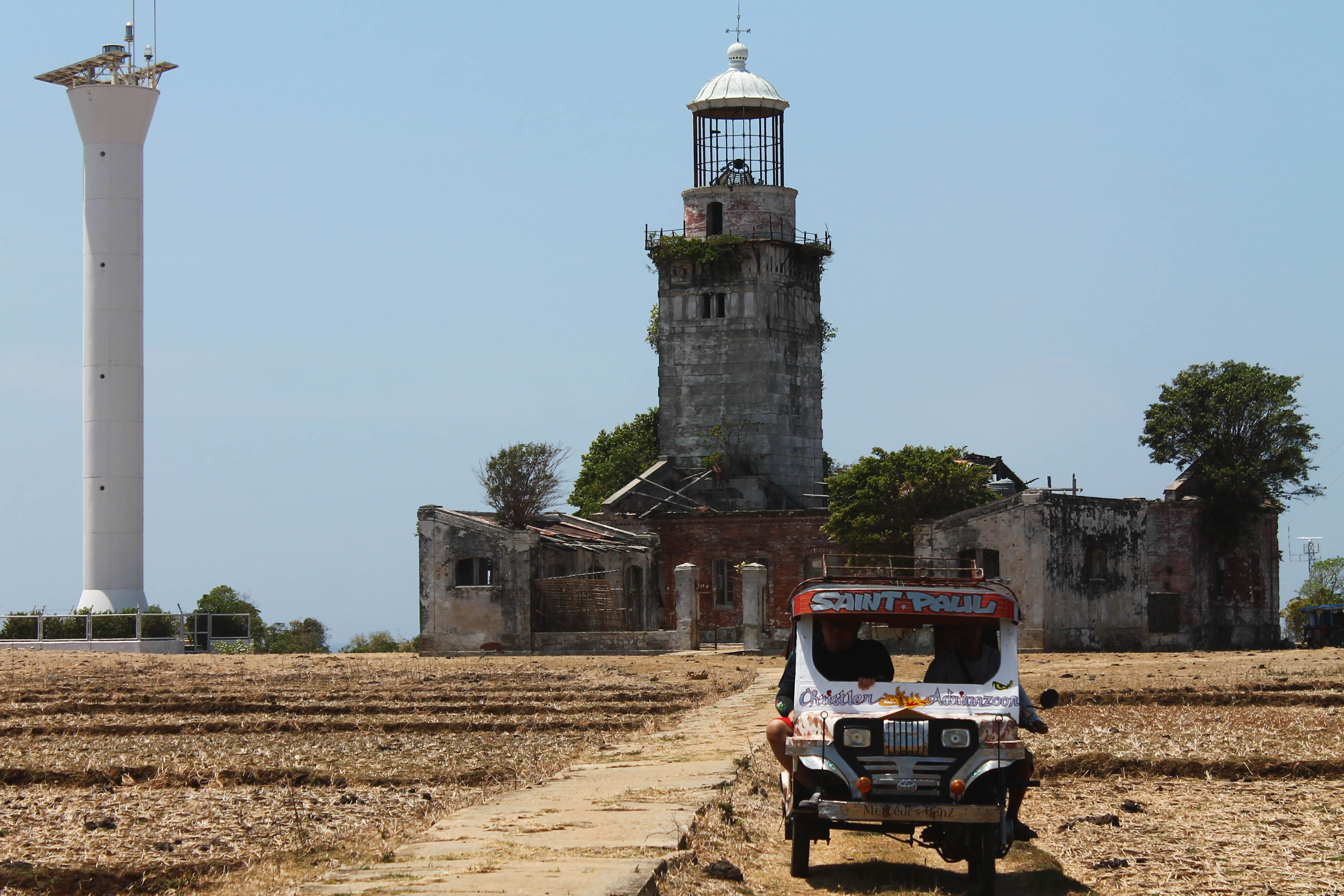
- Cabra Island Lighthouse

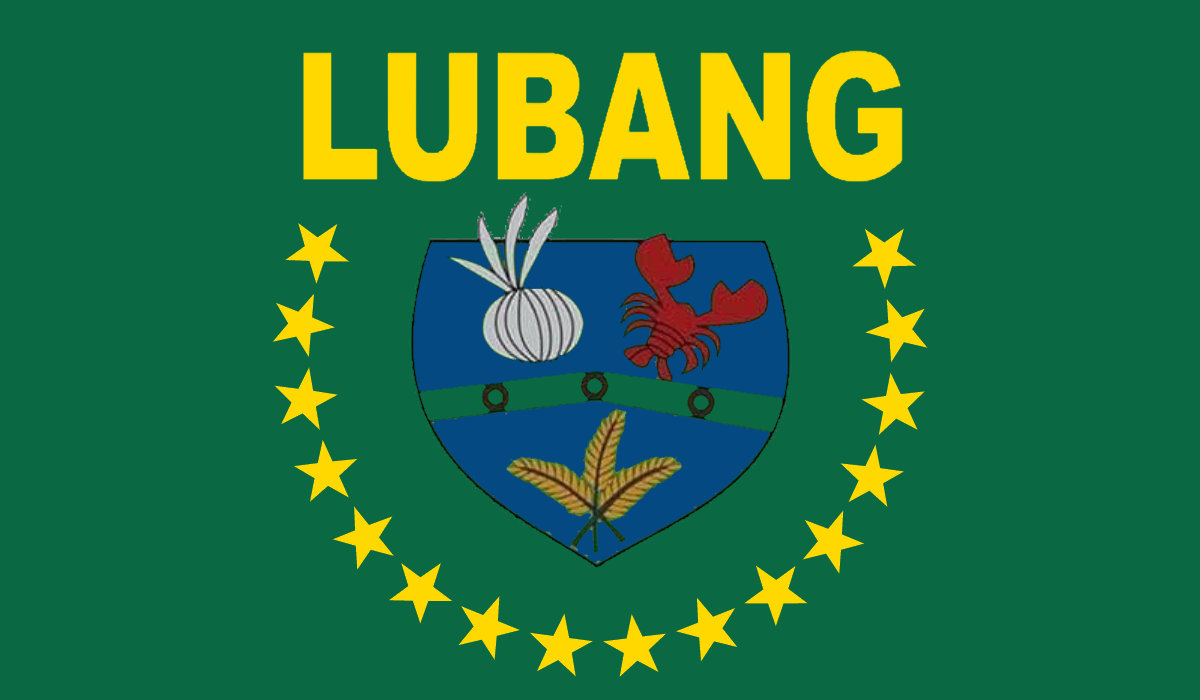
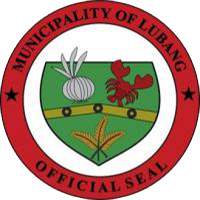
- Flag Seal

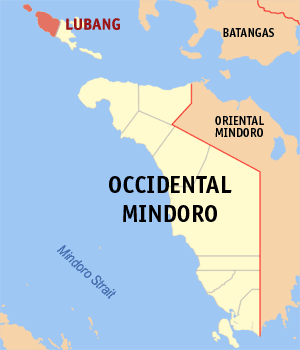
- Map of Occidental Mindoro with Lubang highlighted
- Interactive map of Lubang
- Location within the Philippines
- Coordinates: 13°51′31″N 120°07′22″E
- Country: Philippines
- Region: Mimaropa
- Province: Occidental Mindoro
- District: Lone district
- Barangays: 16 (see Barangays)

Government
  - Type: Sangguniang Bayan
  - Mayor: Michael L. Orayani
  - Vice Mayor: Charles Z. Villas
  - Representative: Leody “Odie” F. Tarriela
  - Municipal Council: Members: Imee Elaine G. Abeleda; Jacquiline V. Laudato; Wilbert D. Zurita; Milton John D. Saludar; Wilbert T. Daulat; Jowelito D. Tejoso; Florante I. Alegre
  - Electorate: 13,497 voters (2025)

Area
  - Total: 113.10 km^{2} (43.67 sq mi)
- Elevation: 9.0 m (29.5 ft)
- Highest elevation: 125 m (410 ft)
- Lowest elevation: 0 m (0 ft)

Population (2024 census)
  - Total: 18,761
  - Density: 165.88/km^{2} (429.63/sq mi)
  - Households: 4,680

Economy
  - Income class: 4th municipal income class
  - Poverty incidence: 14.9% (2023)
  - Revenue: ₱ 167.2 million (2024)
  - Assets: ₱ 361.1 million (2024)
  - Expenditure: ₱ 171.6 million (2024)
  - Liabilities: ₱ 51.74 million (2024)

Service provider
  - Electricity: Lubang Electric Cooperative (LUBELCO)
- Time zone: UTC+8 (PST)
- ZIP code: 5109
- PSGC: 1705104000
- IDD : area code: +63 (0)43
- Native languages: Tagalog

Lubang, officially the Municipality of Lubang (Tagalog: Bayan ng Lubang), is a municipality in the province of Occidental Mindoro, Philippines. According to the 2024 census, it has a population of 18,761 people.

== Geography ==
The municipality encompasses the north-western half of Lubang Island, as well as Cabra Island, which are part of the Tagalog homeland. Lubang is part of the Lubang Island Group, which constitutes seven islands that are geographically distinct from any landmasses, making the island group biologically unique - and endangered at the same time. The islands are under consideration to be set as a UNESCO tentative site due to its geographic importance, biological diversity, and intact rainforests.

=== Barangays ===
Lubang is politically subdivided into 16 barangays. Each barangay consists of puroks and some have sitios.

- Araw At Bituin (Poblacion)
- Bagong Sikat (Poblacion)
- Banaag Ng Pag-Asa (Poblacion)
- Binakas
- Cabra
- Likas Ng Silangan (Poblacion)
- Maguinhawa (Poblacion)
- Maligaya, formerly Bonbon
- Maliig
- Ninikat ng Pag-Asa (Poblacion)
- Paraiso (Poblacion)
- Sorville, formerly Ambulong (Poblacion)
- Tagbac
- Tangal
- Tilik
- Vigo
- Tumibo

=== Climate ===
Climate data for Lubang, Occidental Mindoro
Month	Jan	Feb	Mar	Apr	May	Jun	Jul	Aug	Sep	Oct	Nov	Dec	Year
Mean daily maximum °C (°F)	29 (84)	30 (86)	31 (88)	33 (91)	32 (90)	30 (86)	29 (84)	29 (84)	29 (84)	29 (84)	29 (84)	29 (84)	30 (86)
Mean daily minimum °C (°F)	20 (68)	20 (68)	21 (70)	22 (72)	24 (75)	24 (75)	24 (75)	24 (75)	24 (75)	23 (73)	22 (72)	21 (70)	22 (72)
Average precipitation mm (inches)	11 (0.4)	13 (0.5)	14 (0.6)	32 (1.3)	101 (4.0)	142 (5.6)	208 (8.2)	187 (7.4)	175 (6.9)	131 (5.2)	68 (2.7)	39 (1.5)	1,121 (44.3)
Average rainy days	5.2	5.0	7.4	11.5	19.8	23.5	27.0	25.9	25.2	23.2	15.5	8.3	197.5
Source: Meteoblue

== Demographics ==
Population census of Lubang
Year	Pop.	±% p.a.
1903	4,740	—
1918	6,930	+2.56%
1939	8,702	+1.09%
1948	10,282	+1.87%
1960	11,647	+1.04%
1970	14,335	+2.10%
1975	15,292	+1.30%
1980	15,293	+0.00%
1990	18,800	+2.09%
1995	23,819	+4.53%
2000	22,896	−0.84%
2007	28,267	+2.95%
2010	23,068	−7.13%
2015	18,803	−3.82%
2020	17,437	−1.57%
2024	18,761	+1.77%
Source: Philippine Statistics Authority

== Economy ==
Poverty incidence of Lubang (%)

Source: Philippine Statistics Authority

== Government ==
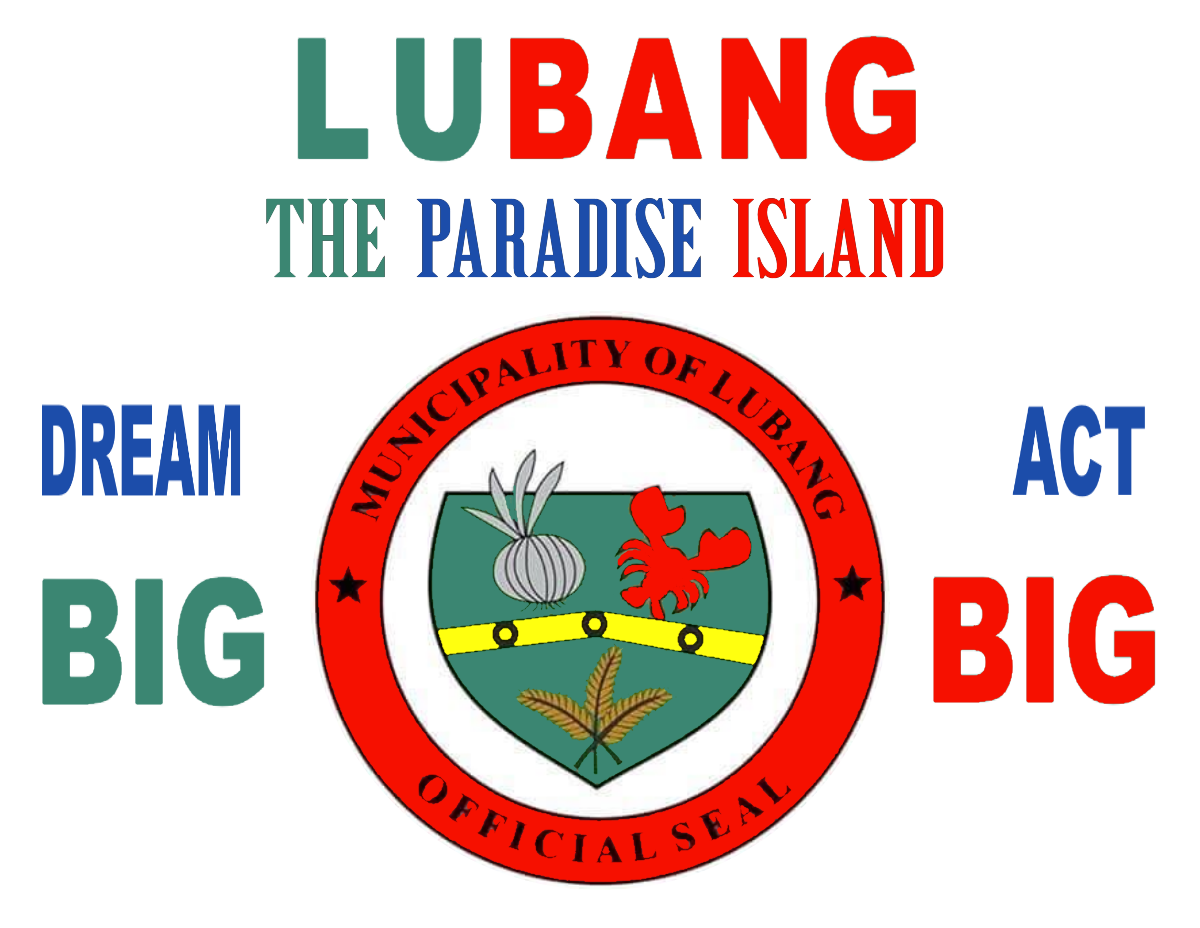
Flag of Lubang, Occidental Mindoro used from 2001-2016 during the mayoral term of Juan Sanchez

The Municipality of Lubang like most, if not all of the municipalities in the Philippines elects a Municipal Mayor who deals with the executive affairs of the municipality, a Municipal Vice Mayor who oversees the Municipal Council, and members of the Municipal Council. Currently, the Mayor of Lubang is Michael L. Orayani and the Vice Mayor is Charles Z. Villas.

The municipality also has ten municipal councilors, eight of which are elected along with the Mayor and Vice Mayor while the other two are from the Federation of Sangguniang Kabataan officers and the Association of Barangay Chairmen of the municipality. Currently, the following are the councilors of the municipality:

1. Guimba, Eugenio (NUP)
2. Villas, Raffy (PDPLBN)
3. Valisno, Cris Andrev (PDPLBN)
4. Abeleda, Imee (LP)
5. Daulat, BuliBuli (NUP)
6. Tiatson, Michael (LP)
7. Moreno, Alma (LP)
8. Agas, Orly (LP)
9. Lim, Aldous Cesar (Association of Barangay Chairmen President)

The municipality, as part of the Province of Occidental Mindoro, also elects provincial government officials. Currently, the provincial government is led by Governor Eduardo Gadiano and by Vice Governor Peter Alfaro.

In the House of Representatives of the Philippines, it is part of the Lone District of Occidental Mindoro currently represented by Congresswoman Josephine Y. Ramirez-Sato.

== Education ==
The Lubang Schools District Office governs all educational institutions within the municipality. It oversees the management and operations of all private and public, from primary to secondary schools.

=== Primary and elementary schools ===
- Binakas Elementary School
- Buli Elementary School
- Cabra Elementary School
- Kay Sameon Elementary School
- Kusang-Loob Elementary School
- Maligaya Elementary School
- Maliig Elementary School (Balaguin Primary School)
- Maliig Elementary School
- Stella Maris School
- Tagbac Elementary School
- Tangal Elementary School
- Tilik Elementary School
- Tilik Elementary School (Balatan Primary School)
- Tumibo Elementary School
- Vigo Elementary School

=== Secondary schools ===
- Lubang Integrated School
- Lubang Vocational High School
- Lubang Vocational High School (Cabra)
- Tilik National High School
