= Looc, Occidental Mindoro =

Municipality in Occidental Mindoro, Philippines

Looc
- Municipality
- Municipality of Looc
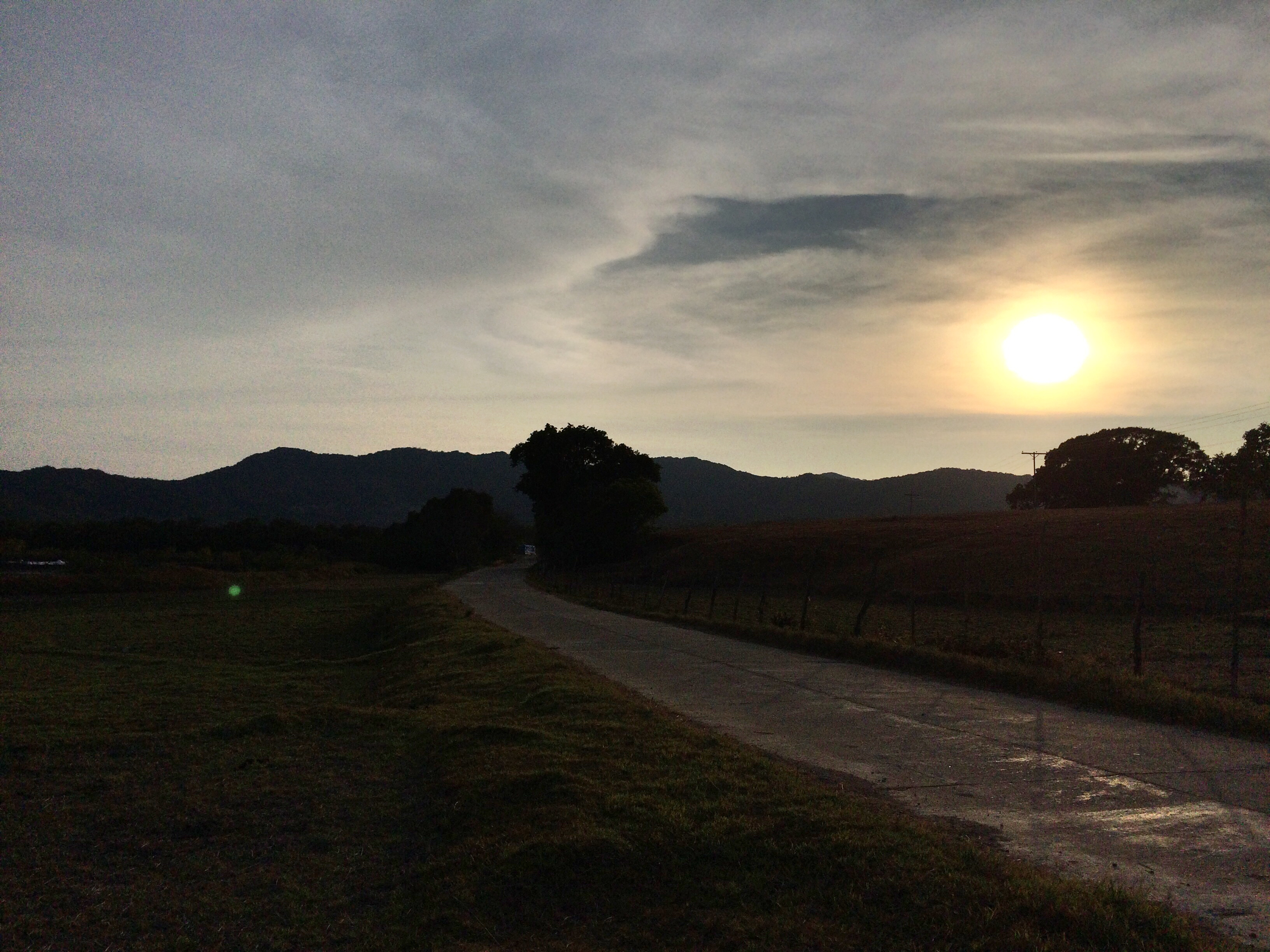
- Sunset in Looc

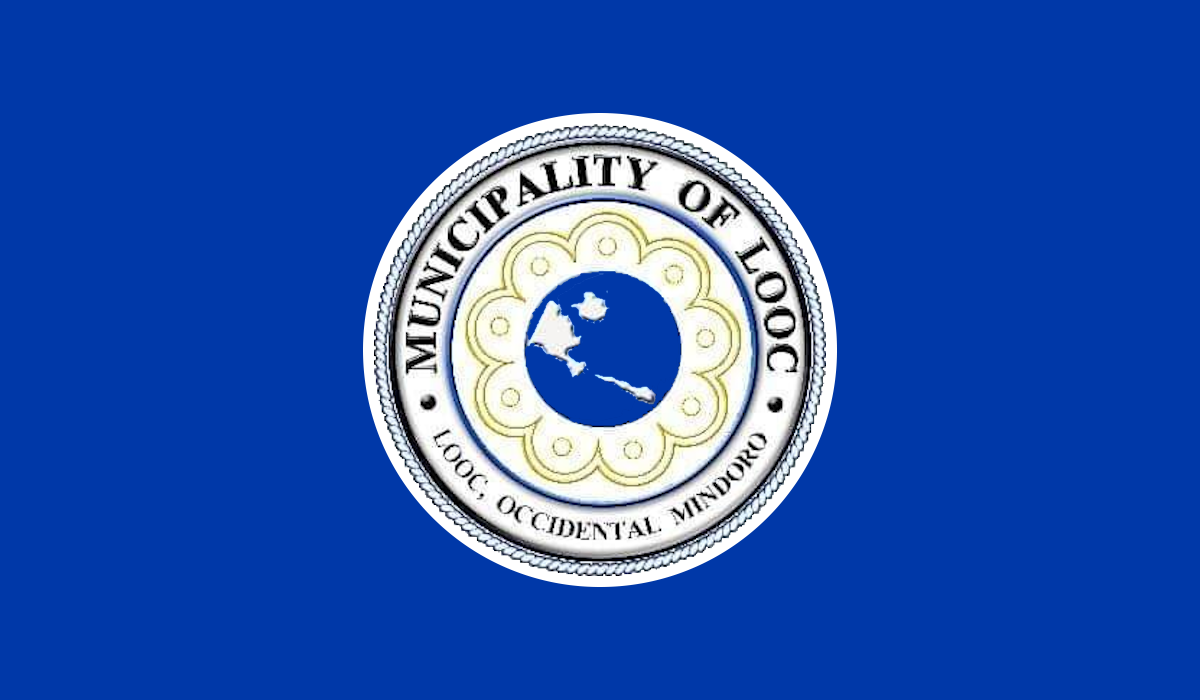
- Flag Seal
- Interactive map of Looc
- Location within the Philippines
- Coordinates: 13°43′N 120°15′E
- Country: Philippines
- Region: Mimaropa
- Province: Occidental Mindoro
- District: Lone district
- Founded: 1913
- Barangays: 9 (see Barangays)

Government
  - Type: Sangguniang Bayan
  - Mayor: Marlon Dela Torre
  - Vice Mayor: Pepe Nobelo
  - Representative: Leody "Odie" Tarriela
  - Electorate: 7,319 voters (2025)

Area
  - Total: 132.30 km^{2} (51.08 sq mi)
- Elevation: 39 m (128 ft)
- Highest elevation: 363 m (1,191 ft)
- Lowest elevation: 0 m (0 ft)

Population (2024 census)
  - Total: 9,426
  - Density: 71.25/km^{2} (184.5/sq mi)
  - Households: 2,103

Economy
  - Income class: 4th municipal income class
  - Poverty incidence: 15.03% (2023)
  - Revenue: ₱ 123.6 million (2024)
  - Assets: ₱ 506.8 million (2024)
  - Expenditure: ₱ 102.6 million (2024)
  - Liabilities: ₱ 45.64 million (2024)

Service provider
  - Electricity: Lubang Electric Cooperative (LUBELCO)
- Time zone: UTC+8 (PST)
- ZIP code: 5111
- PSGC: 1705103000
- IDD : area code: +63 (0)43
- Native languages: Tagalog

Looc, officially the Municipality of Looc (Tagalog: Bayan ng Looc), is a municipality in the province of Occidental Mindoro, Philippines. According to the 2024 census, it has a population of 9,426 people, making it the least populated municipality in the province.

== Geography ==
The municipality encompasses the eastern half of Lubang Island, as well as Ambil, Golo and some other minor islands, which are part of the Tagalog homeland. Looc is part of the Lubang island group, which constitutes 7 islands which are geographically distinct from any landmasses, making the island group biologically unique - and endangered at the same time. The islands are under consideration to be set as a UNESCO tentative site due to its geographic importance, biological diversity, and intact rainforests.

=== Barangays ===
Looc is politically subdivided into nine barangays. Each barangay consists of puroks and some have sitios.

- Agkawayan
- Ambil Tabao & Tambo
- Balikyas
- Bonbon (Poblacion)
- Bulacan
- Burol
- Guitna (Poblacion)
- Kanluran (Poblacion)
- Talaotao

=== Climate ===
Climate data for Looc, Occidental Mindoro
| Month | Jan | Feb | Mar | Apr | May | Jun | Jul | Aug | Sep | Oct | Nov | Dec | Year |
|---|---|---|---|---|---|---|---|---|---|---|---|---|---|
| Mean daily maximum °C (°F) | 29 (84) | 30 (86) | 31 (88) | 33 (91) | 32 (90) | 30 (86) | 29 (84) | 29 (84) | 29 (84) | 29 (84) | 29 (84) | 29 (84) | 30 (86) |
| Mean daily minimum °C (°F) | 20 (68) | 20 (68) | 21 (70) | 22 (72) | 24 (75) | 24 (75) | 24 (75) | 24 (75) | 24 (75) | 23 (73) | 22 (72) | 21 (70) | 22 (72) |
| Average precipitation mm (inches) | 11 (0.4) | 13 (0.5) | 14 (0.6) | 32 (1.3) | 101 (4.0) | 142 (5.6) | 208 (8.2) | 187 (7.4) | 175 (6.9) | 131 (5.2) | 68 (2.7) | 39 (1.5) | 1,121 (44.3) |
| Average rainy days | 5.2 | 5.0 | 7.4 | 11.5 | 19.8 | 23.5 | 27.0 | 25.9 | 25.2 | 23.2 | 15.5 | 8.3 | 197.5 |
Source: Meteoblue

== Demographics ==
Population census of Looc
| Year | Pop. | ±% p.a. |
|---|---|---|
| 1903 | 2,575 | — |
| 1918 | 3,352 | +1.77% |
| 1939 | 3,974 | +0.81% |
| 1948 | 4,299 | +0.88% |
| 1960 | 5,101 | +1.44% |
| 1970 | 5,569 | +0.88% |
| 1975 | 6,491 | +3.12% |
| 1980 | 6,801 | +0.94% |
| 1990 | 7,037 | +0.34% |
| 1995 | 9,031 | +4.79% |
| 2000 | 9,132 | +0.24% |
| 2007 | 11,310 | +2.99% |
| 2010 | 9,758 | −5.23% |
| 2015 | 10,117 | +0.69% |
| 2020 | 7,802 | −5.32% |
| 2024 | 9,426 | +4.64% |
Source: Philippine Statistics Authority

== Economy ==
Poverty incidence of Looc (%)

Source: Philippine Statistics Authority

== Education ==
The Looc Schools District Office governs all educational institutions within the municipality. It oversees the management and operations of all private and public, from primary to secondary schools.

=== Primary and elementary schools ===
- Agkawayan Elementary School
- Balikyas Elementary School
- Bulacan Elementary School
- Burol Elementary School
- Looc Central School
- Tabao Elementary School
- Talaotao Elementary School
- Tambo Elementary School

=== Secondary schools ===
- Looc National High School
- Looc National School of Fisheries
