= Seal of Occidental Mindoro =

Versions
- Seal of Occidental Mindoro (1950–1994)
- Armiger: Occidental Mindoro
- Adopted: March 21, 1994
- Crest: A tamaraw head
- Shield: Per fess, the upper half two mountains proper at the bottom rice field vert, the lower half per pale, the dexter lower half azuere with three bar counter-engrailed argent and tuna embowed proper, the sinister lower half three chevron inverted vert a tree proper and plate on torteau on the chevron nearest to the base.
- Supporters: On both the dexter and sinister a ricestalk proper both within eleven bezzants
- Motto: Province of Occidental Mindoro
- Other elements: Tamaraw, eleven roundels
- Earlier version(s): 1950

The current Seal of Occidental Mindoro is adopted and used on March 21, 1994.

== History seal ==
=== 1950-1994 seal ===
Upon the creation of Occidental Mindoro in 1950, a seal was adopted for the province. The 1950 seal resembles that of its neighboring province of Oriental Mindoro. The history of the seal is dubious regarding the designing and adoption of the seal but according to old officials of the province the following elements symbolizes:

- Roundels: the five roundels or disks symbolizes the five original provinces of Occidental Mindoro; Mamburao, Lubang, Abra de Ilog, Sablayan, and San Jose. The roundels are placed on a red chevron of the shield. The north-facing element, symbolizes the "enthusiastic approach" of the inhabitants of the province to continued progress and development.
- Tamaraws: the three tamaraw heads in the seal represents the three main ethnic groups of the province at that time. The tamaraws together with the shield symbolizes the animals being protected by the people of the province.
- Shield: the shield is yellow-gold in color to represents the etymology of the province name which means Mina de Oro or Mine of Gold.
- The words "Province of Occidental Mindoro" is inscribed in a green background which symbolizes the forests of the province.

=== Present seal ===
The present seal was adopted through the initiatives of Governor Josephine Ramirez-Sato started in early 1992. The provincial government organized a seal design competition in an effort to find a new design to replace the 1950 seal. Five final designs were chosen from the entries submitted on November 15, 1992 and was three designs were chosen from the five. Augusto Viray Jr. was announced first-place winner of the competition and his design was chosen as the primary basis of the current seal.

At the beginning of 1993, Governor Sato organized a committee to finalize the design of the new seal base on the designs of the finalists of the 1992 competition through Executive Order No. 93-02. The final seal design was submitted to the Sangguniang Panlalawigan for approval. During the regular session of the provincial council held on June 21, 1993, Resolution No. 106, Ss. 93 was passed and approved by the Board adopting the new and modified official seal of the province.

The draft seal along with relevant documents were submitted to the Department of the Interior and Local Government on July 20, 1993, where it was studied for two months. The draft seal was then forwarded to the department's Bureau of Local Government Services and on October 13, 1993, it was submitted to the National Historical Commission. On November 4, 1993 the draft was returned to the Office of the Governor of Occidental Mindoro for final comment and possible revision. No revisions were made and the draft design was submitted to the National Historical Institute. In a telegram sent by the National Historical Institute dated February 11, 1994, Governor Sato was informed that the design for the new seal design was approved.

On March 2, 1994, the seal was publicly presented by Governor Sato at the Provincial Developmental Council meeting held on March 2, 1994. By March 21, 1994, the seal was officially adopted for use of the provincial government.

== Description of the present seal ==
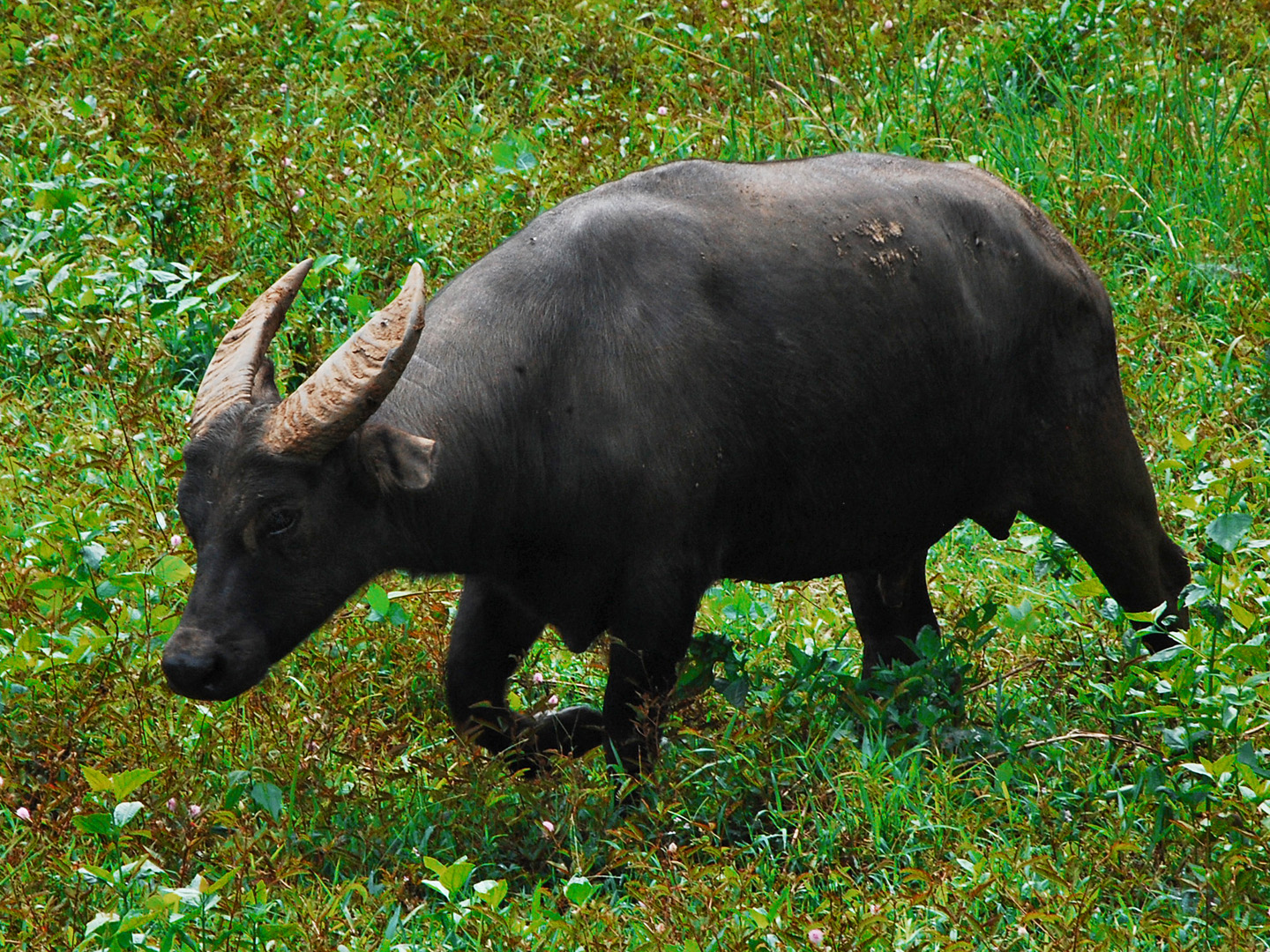
The Tamaraw, one of the elements of both the previous and present seal of Occidental Mindoro

The present seal first approved by the Sangguniang Panlalawigan in 1993 and adopted for use in 1994 has the description.:

- Tamaraw: The tamaraw head is placed in the seal as a reminder to the province's inhabitant to protect the tamaraw, an endangered animal endemic to the island of Mindoro. The tamaraw is associated with the inhabitants of the island.
- Mountains and Ricefield: The chief is occupied by ricefields and two mountains, The two mountains at represents mainland Mindoro and Lubang island group. The ricefields are colored fresh green to represent the abundance of palay and other agricultural products of the province.
- Tuna: A wading tuna is placed at the blue lower left portion of the shield. This represents the aquatic resources of the province. The three wavelike lines at the background represents the national government, provincial government and non-government agencies, which has responsibilities in conserving this resources.
- Tree: a huge living tree is present on the right portion of the shield standing on top of an orange rounded figure with a hollow center. The eternal conservation of the province is symbolized by this. The three heavy lines on the background represents the three entities symbolized by the three wavelike lines at the left portion of the shield, which also has responsibilities in conserving the province's forests.

These elements placed on the shield depicts the commitment of the province's inhabitants in conserving the province's natural resources.

The other elements of the seal depicts:

- Two palay stalks: The full-grained stalks with two leaves each serves as supporters of the shield depicts the major agricultural product of the province - rice. The National Historical Institute is responsible for the curvy lines of the stalks which enhanced the elements aesthetically.
- Roundels: the eleven roundels symbolizes the eleven municipalities of the province, with the roundel at the center symbolizing the provincial capital (currently, Mamburao). The roundels are gold in color to represent their "continued growth and development".
- Inscriptions: "1950" is inscribed at the bottom of the shield to signify the provinces establishment year. The words OFFICIAL SEAL and PROVINCE OF OCCIDENTAL MINDORO were placed in a green background to symbolize the province's forest. The inscriptions were originally stylized in a rope like form to symbolize the inhabitants cohesiveness and unity but was change in a bold black sans-serif typeface for small-scale production of the seal.
