= Occidental Mindoro Sports Complex =

Sports complex in San Jose, Philippines

- Interactive map of Occidental Mindoro Sports Complex
- Location: San Jose, Occidental Mindoro, Philippines
- Coordinates: 12°21′51″N 121°3′36.2″E
- Capacity: 2,000
- Type: Open-air grandstand
- Surface: Grass
- Acreage: 17,689.13 m^{2} (4.37 acres) (approx.)

Construction
- Opened: March 2018

The Occidental Mindoro Sports Complex is a track and field venue in San Jose, Occidental Mindoro.

== Background ==
The Occidental Mindoro Sports Complex was built inside the grounds of the Pedro T. Mendiola Sr. Memorial National High School. It was inaugurated in March 2018 by local officials led by San Jose Mayor Romulo Festin along with provincial officials of Occidental Mindoro. It hosted the MIMAROPA Regional Athletic Association Week which had its opening ceremony on March 12, 2018. The province of Occidental Mindoro last hosted the event in 1970. Its grandstand has a seating capacity of 2,000 people.
