= Magsaysay, Occidental Mindoro =

Municipality in Occidental Mindoro, Philippines

Magsaysay
- Municipality
- Municipality of Magsaysay
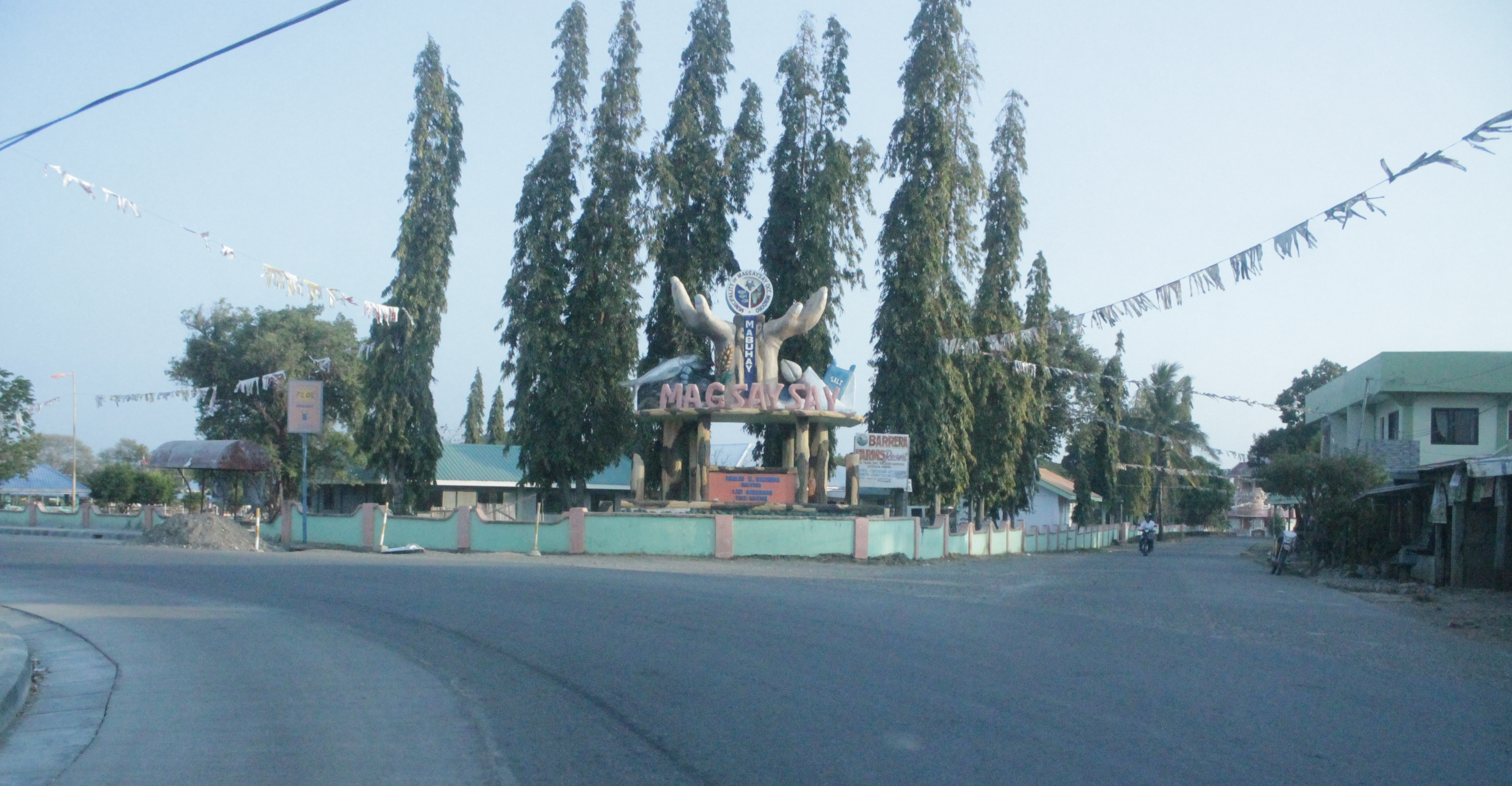
- Poblacion

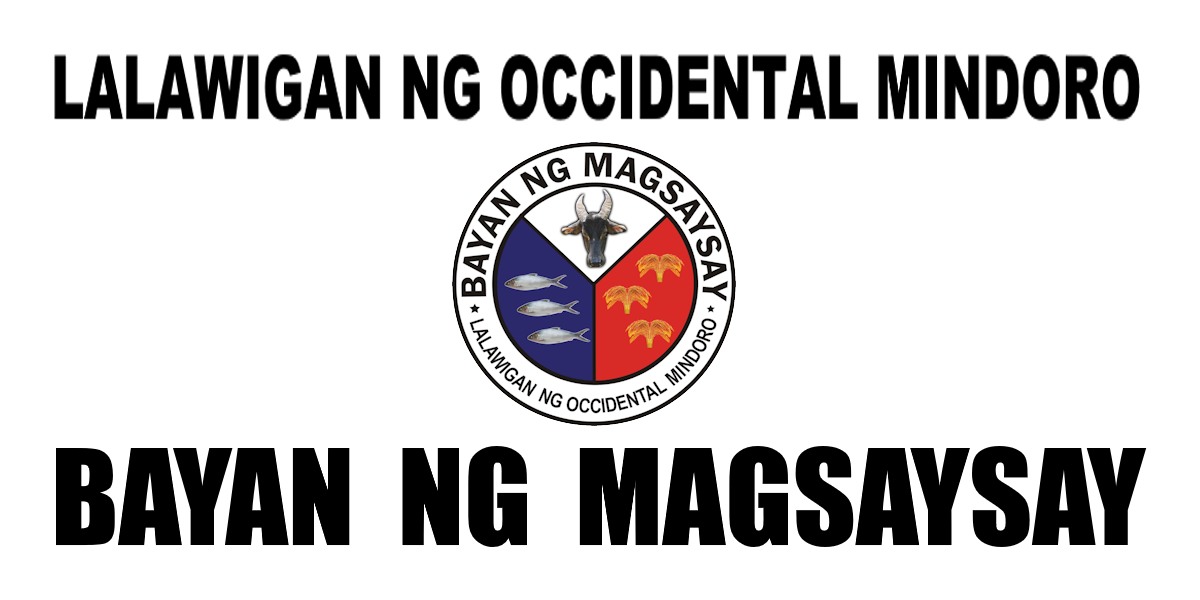
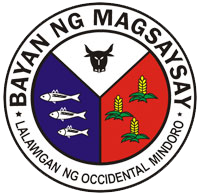
- Flag Seal
- Nickname: Home of the Ratagnons
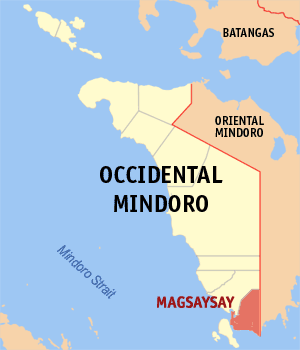
- Map of Occidental Mindoro with Magsaysay highlighted
- Interactive map of Magsaysay
- Location within the Philippines
- Coordinates: 12°18′42″N 121°08′50″E
- Country: Philippines
- Region: Mimaropa
- Province: Occidental Mindoro
- District: Lone district
- Founded: April 3, 1969
- Named for: Ramon Magsaysay
- Barangays: 12 (see Barangays)

Government
  - Type: Sangguniang Bayan
  - Mayor: Cesar M. Tria Jr.
  - Vice Mayor: Benjie Benoza
  - Representative: Leody “Odie” Tarriela
  - Electorate: 23,902 voters (2025)

Area
  - Total: 296.70 km^{2} (114.56 sq mi)
- Elevation: 9.0 m (29.5 ft)
- Highest elevation: 89 m (292 ft)
- Lowest elevation: 0 m (0 ft)

Population (2024 census)
  - Total: 40,987
  - Density: 138.14/km^{2} (357.79/sq mi)
  - Households: 9,140

Economy
  - Income class: 1st municipal income class
  - Poverty incidence: 27.66% (2023)
  - Revenue: ₱ 288.4 million (2024)
  - Assets: ₱ 499.5 million (2024)
  - Expenditure: ₱ 303.2 million (2024)
  - Liabilities: ₱ 104.3 million (2024)

Service provider
  - Electricity: Occidental Mindoro Electric Cooperative (OMECO)
- Time zone: UTC+8 (PST)
- ZIP code: 5101
- PSGC: 1705105000
- IDD : area code: +63 (0)43
- Native languages: Hanunó'o; Ratagnon; Tagalog

Magsaysay, officially the Municipality of Magsaysay (Tagalog: Bayan ng Magsaysay), is a municipality in the province of Occidental Mindoro, Philippines. According to the 2024 census, it has a population of 40,987 people.

== History ==
=== Foundation ===
Magsaysay was formerly as a part of San Jose. On April 3, 1969, it was created as a separate municipality by virtue of Republic Act 5459, signed by President Ferdinand Marcos.

=== New People's Army rebellion ===
Somewhere in 1987, the New People's Army established a base in the hinterlands of the municipality. In October of the same year, a group composing of hundreds of NPA cadres arrived at the municipality via 6x6 ELF trucks and attacked the municipal hall and the nearby police station, in which 1 police officer, 3 prisoners and 1 civilian were killed in the raid, while 2 other police officers were abducted and brought into their mountain base before being released. No employees inside the municipal hall were killed, but the raid destroyed several important documents in the hall.

== Geography ==
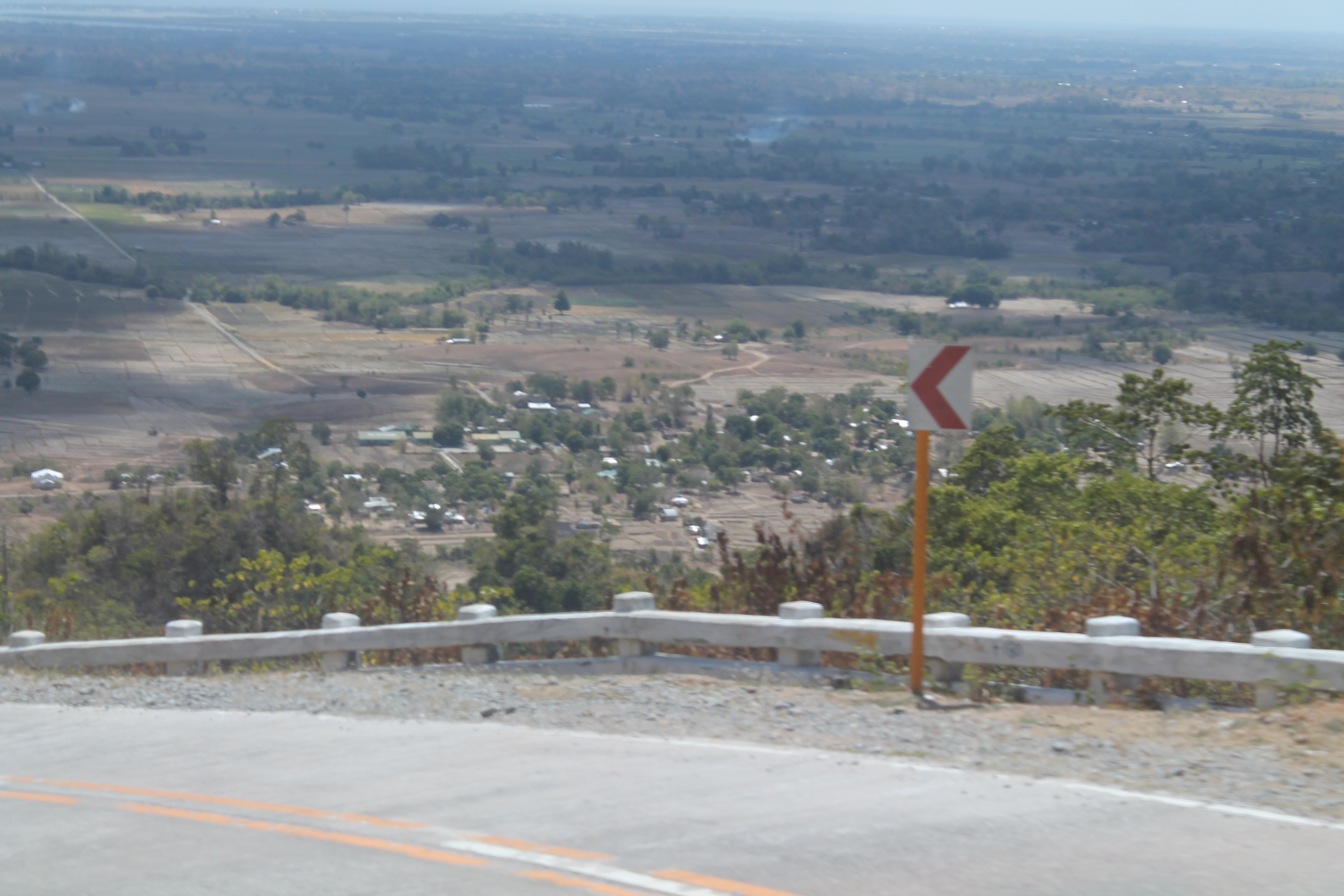
A small settlement in Magsaysay, away from the town center.

Magsaysay, one of the eleven municipalities in the Occidental Mindoro, lies on the southernmost part of Mindoro Island, and is adjacent to the municipality of San Jose on the north; on the east separated by chain of valleys and mountains in the municipality of Bulalacao, Oriental Mindoro; on the south, by Garza Island; and on the west by Iling Island. It is facing the China Sea, with vast plains and valleys. It is characterized by rugged terrain with plain areas. Slope ranges from level to very steep sloping areas. The highest point of elevation is 543 feet above sea level.

The municipality has a total land area of 29,670 hectares (73,300 acres) with a land density of 91.0 per square kilometer. Magsaysay is characterized by rugged terrain with plain areas located at Barangays Calawag, Gapasan, Laste, Nicolas, Purnaga, and Paclolo. Slope of 3-8 percent are observed in the surroundings of Barangays Alibog, Lourdes, Sibalat, Poblacion and Santa Teresa. It is drained by the Caguray River.

Slope ranges from level to very steeply sloping land. The highest point of elevation at 543 feet above sea level located at the north-east portion of Barangay Purnaga, which has slopes of 18 percent and above. Majority or 97.14 percent of the total land area falls below 18 percent slope, which is based on the Forestry Code can be classified Alienable and Disposable or areas that can be owned. This manifests minimal limitation in terms of land development for land falling above 18 percent or land classified as forests have minimal share of only 2.86 percent.

The municipality has abundant water resource for domestic consumption and irrigation supply. Ground water serves as a main source of potable water supply including natural springs. Various river systems also traverse the locality, which is being utilized for irrigation such as Caguray River. In the same manner, it also serves as a natural drainage system in the locality.

Magsaysay is 187 kilometres (116 mi) from Mamburao and 215 kilometres (134 mi) from Calapan.

=== Barangays ===
Magsaysay is politically subdivided into 12 barangays. Each barangay consists of puroks and some have sitios.

Currently, only one is classified urban and the rest of the barangays are rural. Five of which are coastal barangays.

- Alibog
- Caguray
- Calawag
- Gapasan
- Laste
- Lourdes
- Nicolas (Bulo)
- Paclolo
- Poblacion
- Purnaga
- Santa Teresa
- Sibalat

=== Climate ===
Climate data for Magsaysay, Occidental Mindoro
Month	Jan	Feb	Mar	Apr	May	Jun	Jul	Aug	Sep	Oct	Nov	Dec	Year
Mean daily maximum °C (°F)	30 (86)	31 (88)	32 (90)	32 (90)	31 (88)	30 (86)	29 (84)	29 (84)	29 (84)	29 (84)	30 (86)	30 (86)	30 (86)
Mean daily minimum °C (°F)	21 (70)	21 (70)	22 (72)	24 (75)	25 (77)	25 (77)	25 (77)	25 (77)	25 (77)	24 (75)	23 (73)	22 (72)	24 (74)
Average precipitation mm (inches)	00 (0)	26 (1.0)	39 (1.5)	58 (2.3)	192 (7.6)	283 (11.1)	341 (13.4)	323 (12.7)	317 (12.5)	231 (9.1)	119 (4.7)	56 (2.2)	1,985 (78.1)
Average rainy days	10.3	8.3	12.4	16.3	23.5	27.1	28.4	27.3	27.6	26.3	19.2	13.6	240.3
Source: Meteoblue

== Demographics ==
Population census of Magsaysay
Year	Pop.	±% p.a.
1970	11,475	—
1975	13,132	+2.74%
1980	17,560	+5.98%
1990	21,580	+2.08%
1995	26,947	+4.25%
2000	28,740	+1.39%
2007	30,459	+0.80%
2010	31,969	+1.78%
2015	36,016	+2.30%
2020	39,767	+2.11%
2024	40,987	+0.73%
Source: Philippine Statistics Authority

Since 1970, total population has been continuously increasing with fluctuating growth rate. The highest growth rate of 5.98 percent was noted between 1975 and 1980 while the least growth rate of 1.76 percent was recorded between 1985 and 1990.

=== Language ===
The municipality is home to the indigenous Ratagnon language of the Ratagnon people. The language is extremely endangered, with only 2 people speaking the language out of 2,000 Ratagnon residents. Due to government programs from the 1960s to 1970s, most Ratagnons have shifted to the Tagalog language, endangering their own culture. There has yet to be a revitalization program for the language. If no such program is made within the next 5–10 years, the language may be deemed as the first language of the Philippines that has gone extinct in the 21st century, and the fifth Philippine language to be extinct. Other indigenous language spoken in the municipality include Hanunu'o and Buhid. Karay-a and Hiligaynon are also varyingly spoken in Magsaysay due to its geographical contact with Panay.

== Economy ==
Poverty incidence of Magsaysay (%)

Source: Philippine Statistics Authority

== Education ==
The Magsaysay Schools District Office governs all educational institutions within the municipality. It oversees the management and operations of all private and public, from primary to secondary schools.

=== Primary and elementary schools ===
- Alibog Elementary School
- Bagong Silang Elementary School
- Bamban Elementary School
- Bambanay Elementary School
- Banga Primary School
- Bukal Elementary School
- Buriraoan Elementary School
- Cabag Primary School
- Caguray Elementary School
- Calachuchi Elementary School
- Calawag Elementary School
- Canabang Elementary School
- Cawit Elementary School
- Emok Elementary School
- Gapasan Elementary School
- Garza Elementary School
- Guballa Elementary School
- Hinango Elementary School
- Laste Elementary School
- Lourdes Elementary School
- Magarang Elementary School
- Magsaysay Central School
- Magsaysay United Methodist Church Development Center for Children
- Nalwak Elementary School
- Nicolas Elementary School
- Paclolo Elementary School
- Purnaga Elementary School
- Sta. Teresa Elementary School
- Sto. Cristo Elementary School
- Sibalat Elementary School
- Sibalat Elementary School (Silad Elementary School Annex)
- Tadlok Elementary School
- Talaba Elementary School
- Tilaga Elementary School

=== Secondary schools ===
- Magsaysay National High School
- Magsaysay National High School (Purnaga Annex)
- Magsaysay National High School (Alibog Annex)
- Paclolo National High School
- Saint Paul Kiddie Center
- Sta. Teresa National High School
