= Occidental Mindoro =

Province in Mimaropa, Philippines

- Province
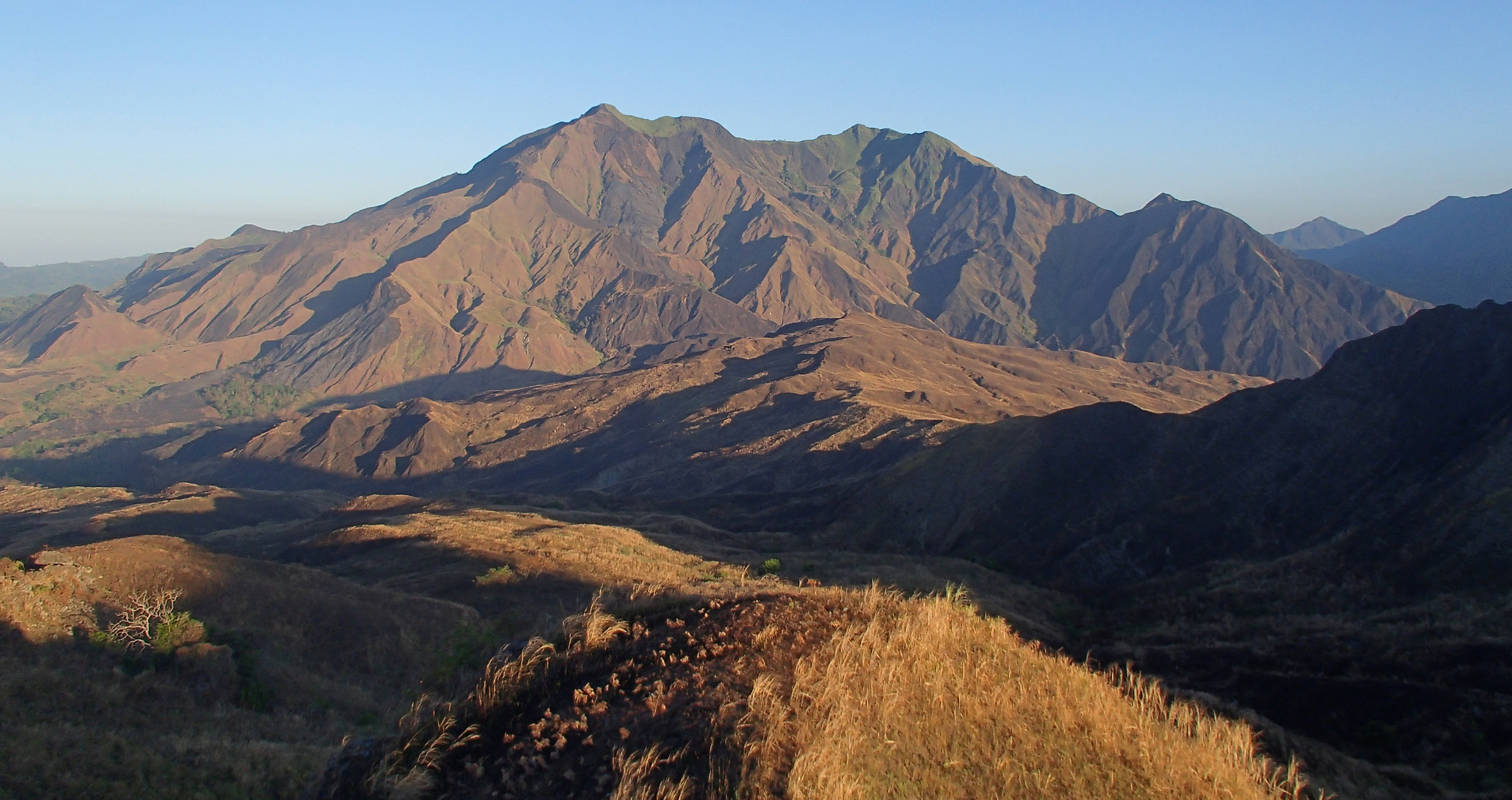
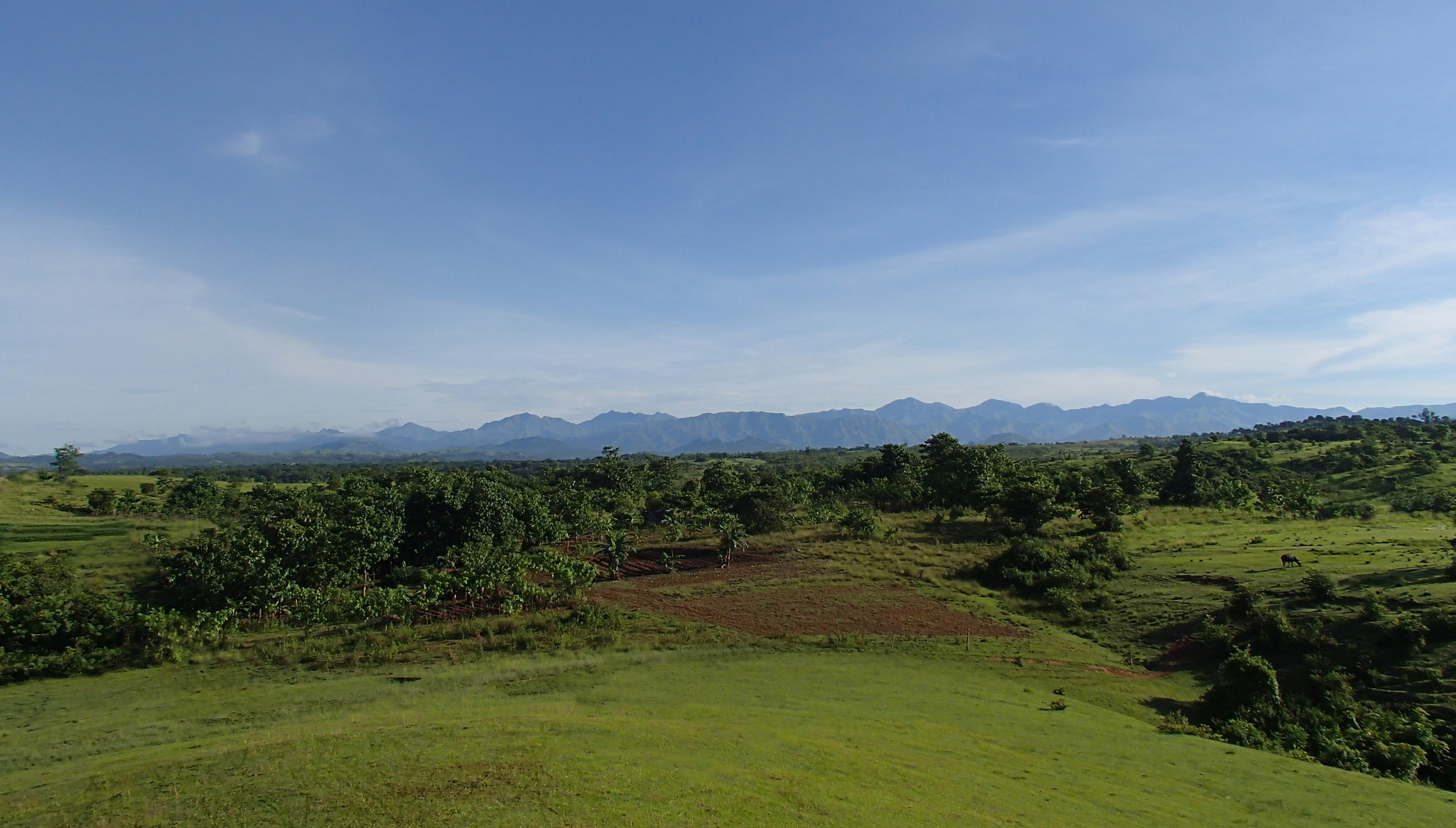
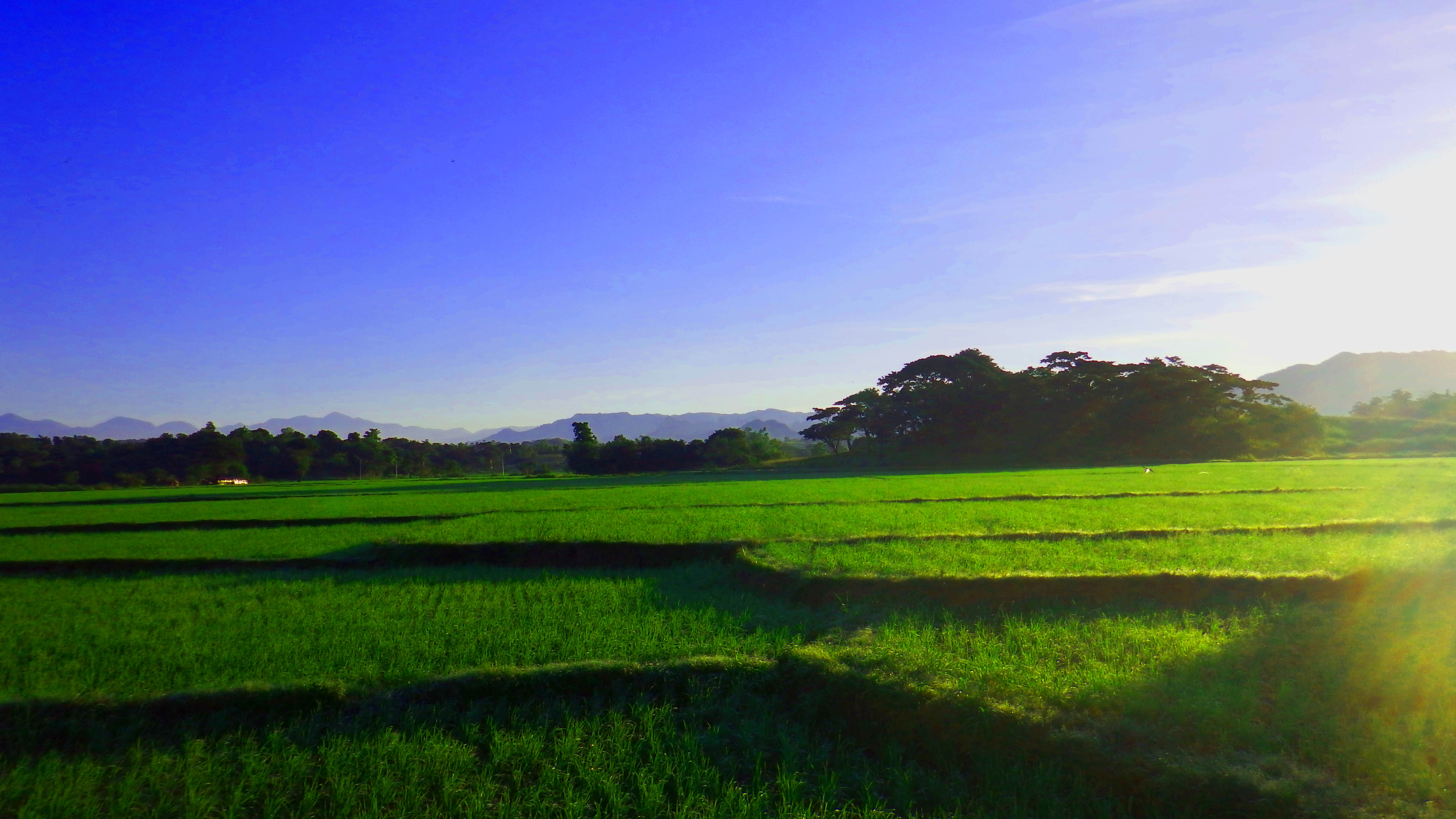
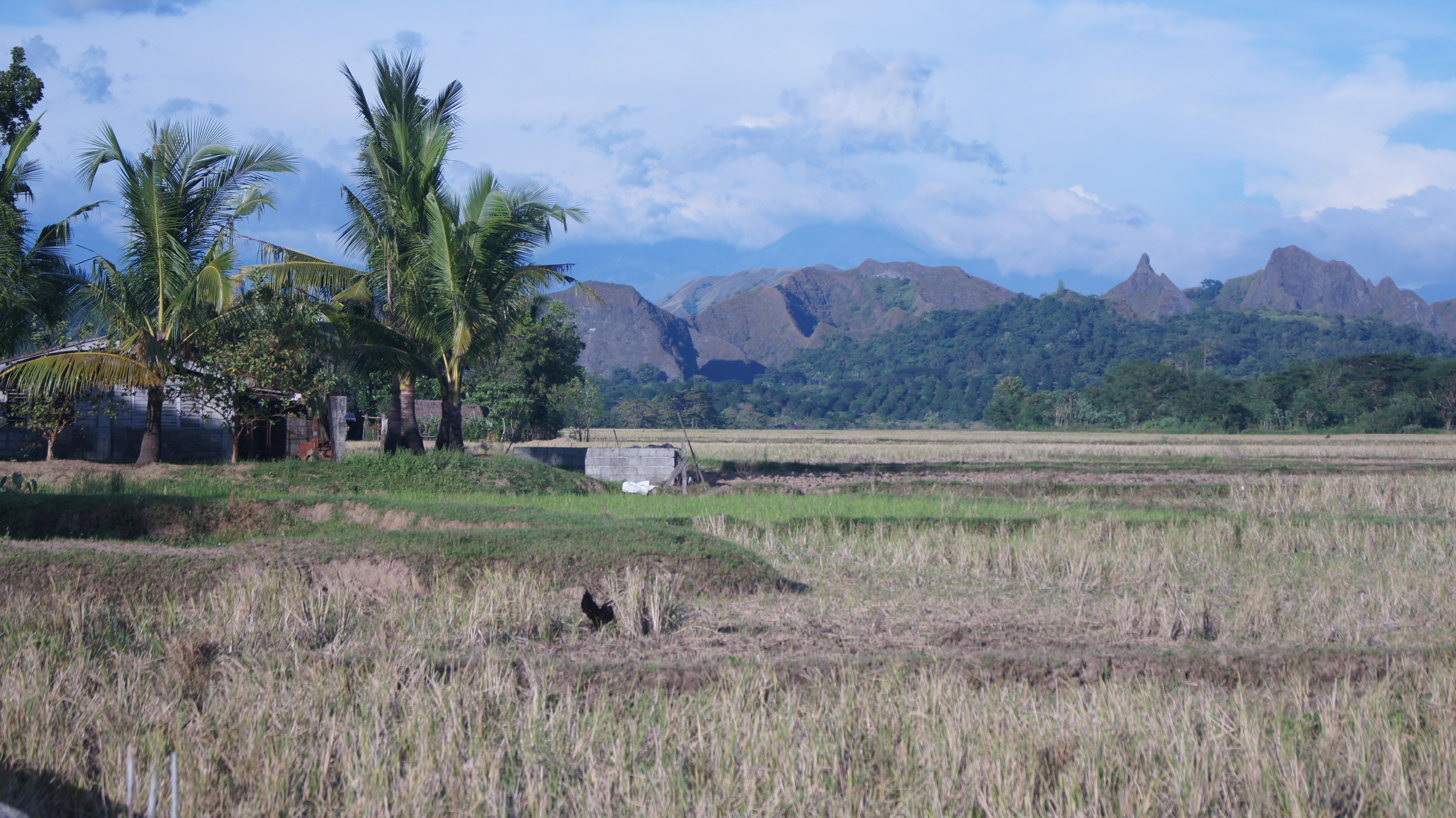
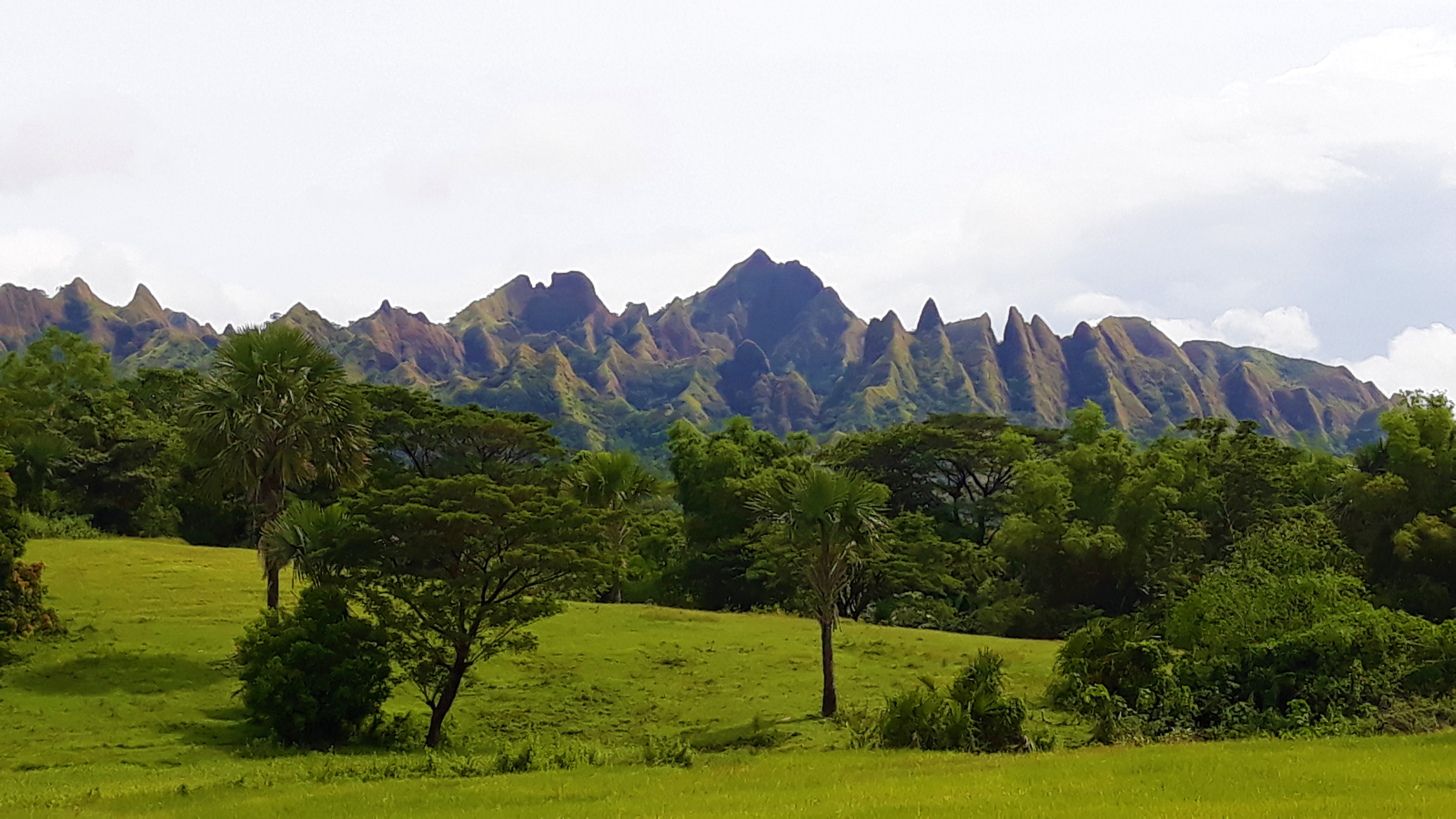
- (from top: left to right) Iglit-Baco National Park, Occidental Mindoro Sports Complex, Sitio Mabuhay, Camburay, San Roque and Devils Mountain in San Jose.

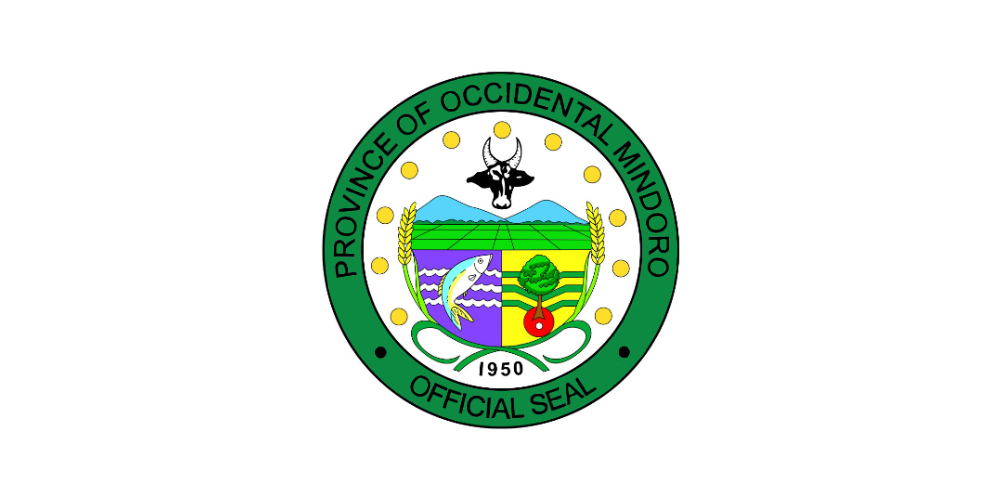
- Flag Seal

- Location in the Philippines
- Interactive map of Occidental Mindoro
- Coordinates: 13°00′N 120°55′E
- Country: Philippines
- Region: Mimaropa
- Founded: November 15, 1950
- Capital: Mamburao
- Largest Municipality: San Jose

Government
  - Type: Sangguniang Panlalawigan
  - Governor: Eduardo Gadiano (PFP)
  - Vice Governor: Diana Apigo-Tayag (PFP)
  - Representative: Leody F. Tarriela (PFP)
  - Legislature: Occidental Mindoro Provincial Board

Area
  - Total: 5,865.71 km^{2} (2,264.76 sq mi)
  - Rank: 11th out of 82
- Highest elevation (Mount Baco): 2,488 m (8,163 ft)

Population (2024 census)
  - Total: 511,417
  - Rank: 58th out of 82
  - Density: 87.1876/km^{2} (225.815/sq mi)
  - Rank: 71st out of 82
  - Households: 126,633
- Demonyms: Mindoreño; Mindorense

Divisions
  - Independent cities: 0
  - Component cities: 0
  - Municipalities: 11: Abra de Ilog; Calintaan; Looc; Lubang; Magsaysay; Mamburao; Paluan; Rizal; Sablayan; San Jose; Santa Cruz
  - Barangays: 164
  - Districts: Legislative district of Occidental Mindoro

Economy
  - Income class: 1st provincial income class
  - Poverty incidence: 20.6% (2023)
  - Revenue: ₱ 3,056 million (2024)
  - Assets: ₱ 5,259 million (2024)
  - Expenditure: ₱ 2,678 million (2024)
  - Liabilities: ₱ 711.4 million (2024)
- Time zone: UTC+8 (PHT)
- PSGC: 175100000
- IDD : area code: +63 (0)43
- ISO 3166 code: PH-MDC
- Spoken languages: Tagalog; Mangyan; English
- Website: occidentalmindoro.gov.ph

Occidental Mindoro (Tagalog: Kanlurang Mindoro), officially the Province of Occidental Mindoro (Tagalog: Lalawigan ng Kanlurang Mindoro or Lalawigan ng Occidental Mindoro), is a province in the Philippines located in the Mimaropa region. The province occupies the western half of the island of Mindoro. Its capital is Mamburao, but the most populous municipality is San Jose. Sablayan is its largest municipality in terms of area, occupying almost half of the entire province. As of 2020, Occidental Mindoro has 525,354 inhabitants.

The province is bordered on the east by the province of Oriental Mindoro, and on the south by the Mindoro Strait. The South China Sea is to the west of the province and Palawan is located to the southwest, across the Mindoro Strait. Batangas is to the north, separated by the Verde Island Passage, a protected marine area and the center of the world's marine biodiversity.

== History ==
=== Early history ===
Mindoro Island was originally known to the ancients as Ma-i. It was formally called Mait, and known to the Chinese traders before the coming of the Spanish. Its existence was mentioned in the old Chinese chronicles in 775 A.D. and more elaborately in 1225.

The natives of Mindoro were called Manguianes by the Spaniards. But the natives refer to themselves by their ethnic or clan identification. There were seven such ethnic or clan distinctions, which are differentiated by language and areas where each can be found. There are no authentic documents in existence explaining the origins of the Mangyan, but later theoreticians postulate that they migrated from Indonesia before 775 A.D. They hopped from island to island, until finally settling down permanently in Mindoro. It appeared that clan settlements existed in the North as well as in the southern ends of the island. By 779, the southwest coast of the island was already a known trading center, and its fine natural harbor frequented by Indian and Chinese maritime traders who plied the route.

The first semblance of a political system in Mindoro's experience was provided by China in the 13th century. Chinese imperial forces under Admiral Cheng Ho with a powerful armada of 60 war junks visited Mindoro and other parts of the archipelago in the 13th century, with the purpose of gaining more trading favors for Chinese merchants. Cheng Ho tried to exert some effort of rule as a prelude to annexation. Internal trouble in the China, however, recalled the armada, and the attempts to annex the archipelago did not materialize.

Some time afterwards, Islamic influence reached the island, probably, through Suluanons who traded with the natives. Moslem peoples, possibly - Orang Dampuans (economic refugees from Sulu) crossed Mindoro Strait from Paragua (now Palawan) and settled along the coastal areas, developing progressive maritime communities.

=== Spanish colonial era ===
In 1570, the Spanish began to explore the island and named it Mina de Oro ("mine of gold") after finding some of the precious metal, though no major gold discoveries were made. In 1572, Captain Juan de Salcedo of the Spanish expeditionary army set sail from Cebu and explored the west coast of the island, encountering the Mangyans, who appeared used to seeing foreigners and were unsurprised at their arrival. Instead, Salcedo and Martin de Goiti were surprised to see cross designs on the clothing and basketwork of the natives, and thought some early Christian missionary had been there before them. But later scholars believed the design was Indic in origin and had no religious meaning.

The Spaniards also encountered Moro settlers in Lubang Island that were vassals of and paid tribute to the kingdom of Maynila in the North, under Rajah Sulayman. This was the first real political system in the island. The Moros, who apparently had heard of the invaders from their kinsmen in the south, engaged the small Spanish force who landed on their shore, but the Spaniards' arquebuses and cannon fire from the ships hoved-to broadside to the island took the field. The Moros fled to the hills, and Salcedo burned their village. After the defeat of Sulaiman in the same year, Mindoro and other vassal states of Maynila became subject of Spanish rule. The island was officially referred to from then on as Mina de Oro, compressed later on into Mindoro. The ancient name, Ma-i, fell into disuse.

The Spanish-Moro war continued in Mindoro until the end of the Spanish regime in the 19th century. In 1602, Moro forces plundered the most important Spanish towns along the coasts of Mindoro and Southern Luzon, and subsequently reestablished their hold in Mindoro by constructing a fort at Mamburao. From 1720 onwards, Moro raids became devastating not only to the island's Hispanized communities but to other parts of the archipelago as well. In 1757, the Moros, more particularly, the Iranuns organized a war fleet of 74 fast native ships called prahus. They destroyed several settlements in the island, carrying off their inhabitants to be sold as slaves in Jolo. The fact that a Moro fort at Mamburao threatened Manila, the capital of the colonial government, embarrassed the conquerors in the eyes of their native subjects, which was politically intolerable to the Spanish administrators. So in 1766, the Spaniards gathered a large force of 1,200 marines, augmented by a large army of native mercenaries, and burned the Iranun fort. But the Moros simply fled into the hills to escape, and came back when the counter-raid was over and the raiders returned to Manila.

The Moros not only plundered goods, but also took prisoners of war which they sold as slaves. Many Islamic leaders in Mindanao supported piratical raids with arms, ammunition and food, not only because it was a patriotic act, but also because it was profitable. They received part of the "prisoners of war" when a successful raider returned, which earned them huge amounts. Most of the raids were successful because of the fast watercraft in the employ of the raiders. It was not until the commission of the vapor, fast steamships, in the mid-18th century that the Spanish navy successfully patrolled the archipelagic waters, and fared well against the wind-powered native seacraft of the pirates. Many pirate fleets were sunk at sea, or confined to their hiding places. The invention of machines during the Industrial Revolution, which gradually replaced manual labor, and the consecutive abolitions of slave ownership in many liberalized countries, caused a great decline in the demand for slave labor. Many of the pirate markets closed, and prices fell severely for captives. With losses to the Spanish navy increasing, and the eventual fall in profits from slave selling, raiding became less appealing to the Iranuns and their supporters. The pirate fort in Mamburao was abandoned, and the Moros retreated to Mindanao to consolidate their forces and continue the resistance in Mindanao. The Spanish presence in Mindoro was strentgthened.

In 1896, the Philippine Revolution broke out. In 1897, the Spaniards posted a rifle company of 140 troops and 51 marines to Calapan to secure the island from the forces of General Emilio Aguinaldo and his revolutionary army, then beginning to overrun Spanish positions in the archipelago. In 1898, the revolutionaries attacked and overwhelmed the settlement of Bongabong and western Mindoro. Finally, they marched against the capital of Calapan with some 1,000 ill-armed foot soldiers, However, the Spanish defenses held. It was only the arrival of 1,000 regular army troops with artillery, all under the command of Miguel Malvar in Batangas, that compelled the surrender of the Spaniards under Governor Morales. On July 1, 1898, Spanish rule in Mindoro Island, lasting for 328 years, ended.

=== American occupation ===
A new battalion "Mindoro", with two rifle companies, was formed under the command of Captain Ruperto Hernandez and Estanislao Cayton, both from Batangas. The revolutionary political reins were held by the elite, who also held the same reins under the Spaniards (and later under the Americans).

In 1910, the successor United States politico-military administration granted over 50 square kilometres (19 sq mi) of land to the Welch and Fargo Sugar Company in what is now San Jose, which built the first modern and biggest sugar mill in the Far East at Siete Central (now barangay Central). In the same year, the boldly developing community of sugar cane planters, mill workers, company professionals and businessmen enabled the creation of San Jose as an official town.

=== Philippine independence ===
In 1950, the province of Mindoro was divided into Oriental Mindoro and Occidental Mindoro by virtue of Republic Act No. 505.

=== Contemporary history ===
In April 2023, the provincial government placed the entire province under a state of calamity due to recurring 20-hour daily power outages.

== Geography ==
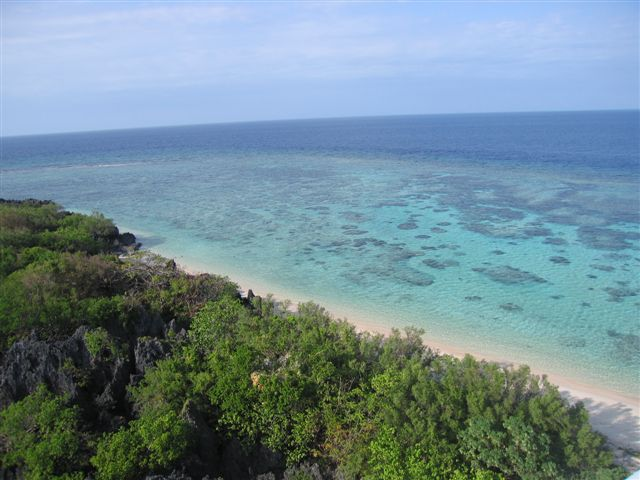
Apo Reef

Occidental Mindoro covers a total area of 5,865.71 square kilometres (2,264.76 sq mi) occupying the western section of the Mindoro island, and includes outlying islands in the northwest.

General land surface features that characterize Occidental Mindoro are mountains, rivers, hills, valleys, wide plains and some small fresh water lakes. The taller mountains can be found in the interior that it shares with Oriental Mindoro. Mountain ranges converge on the two central peaks, Mount Halcon in the north, and Mount Baco in the south. There is also a mountain known as bundok ng susong dalaga, the "Maiden's breast mountain", that looks like a reclined woman.

The northern part of the province has relatively fewer plains, while the southern parts have wider flatlands. Most of the plains are cultivated fields, with few remaining untouched forests. Significant hilly areas can be found rolling off in Santa Cruz in the north, and in San Jose and Magsaysay in the south. These are grassed-over rather than forested.

There are several major drainage or river systems flowing on a generally westerly course: Mamburao River, Pagbahan, Mompong, Biga, Lumintao, Busuanga and Caguray. Swamp areas are restricted to the south, specially, along the river mouths.

The province is also home to one of the most popular coral reefs in the Philippines, Apo Reef.

=== Climate ===
Occidental Mindoro has two distinct weather types: rainy season and dry season. Rains begin to fall in the province in late May, intensifying through June, July, August, September and October, then gradually subsides in November. The months of August and September are the wettest period, with storms directly passing through the area.

On the other hand, dry season starts in November, with rainfall subsiding in intensity, and altogether ceasing in January, February, March and April. March and April are the driest period, with cloudless skies and parched earth characterizing the general area.

Temperature range is from 26 °C (79 °F) in the windy uplands to 32 °C (90 °F) in the lowlands.

Climate data for Occidental Mindoro
Month	Jan	Feb	Mar	Apr	May	Jun	Jul	Aug	Sep	Oct	Nov	Dec	Year
Mean daily maximum °C (°F)	29.3 (84.7)	29.9 (85.8)	31.4 (88.5)	32.6 (90.7)	32.6 (90.7)	32.3 (90.1)	31.8 (89.2)	31.8 (89.2)	31.9 (89.4)	31.4 (88.5)	30.8 (87.4)	29.5 (85.1)	31.3 (88.3)
Mean daily minimum °C (°F)	22.1 (71.8)	22.2 (72.0)	23.2 (73.8)	24.1 (75.4)	24.2 (75.6)	23.9 (75.0)	23.7 (74.7)	23.9 (75.0)	23.7 (74.7)	23.5 (74.3)	23.4 (74.1)	22.6 (72.7)	23.4 (74.1)
Average rainy days	15	10	8	7	11	15	15	13	13	16	17	18	158
Source: Storm247

=== Administrative divisions ===
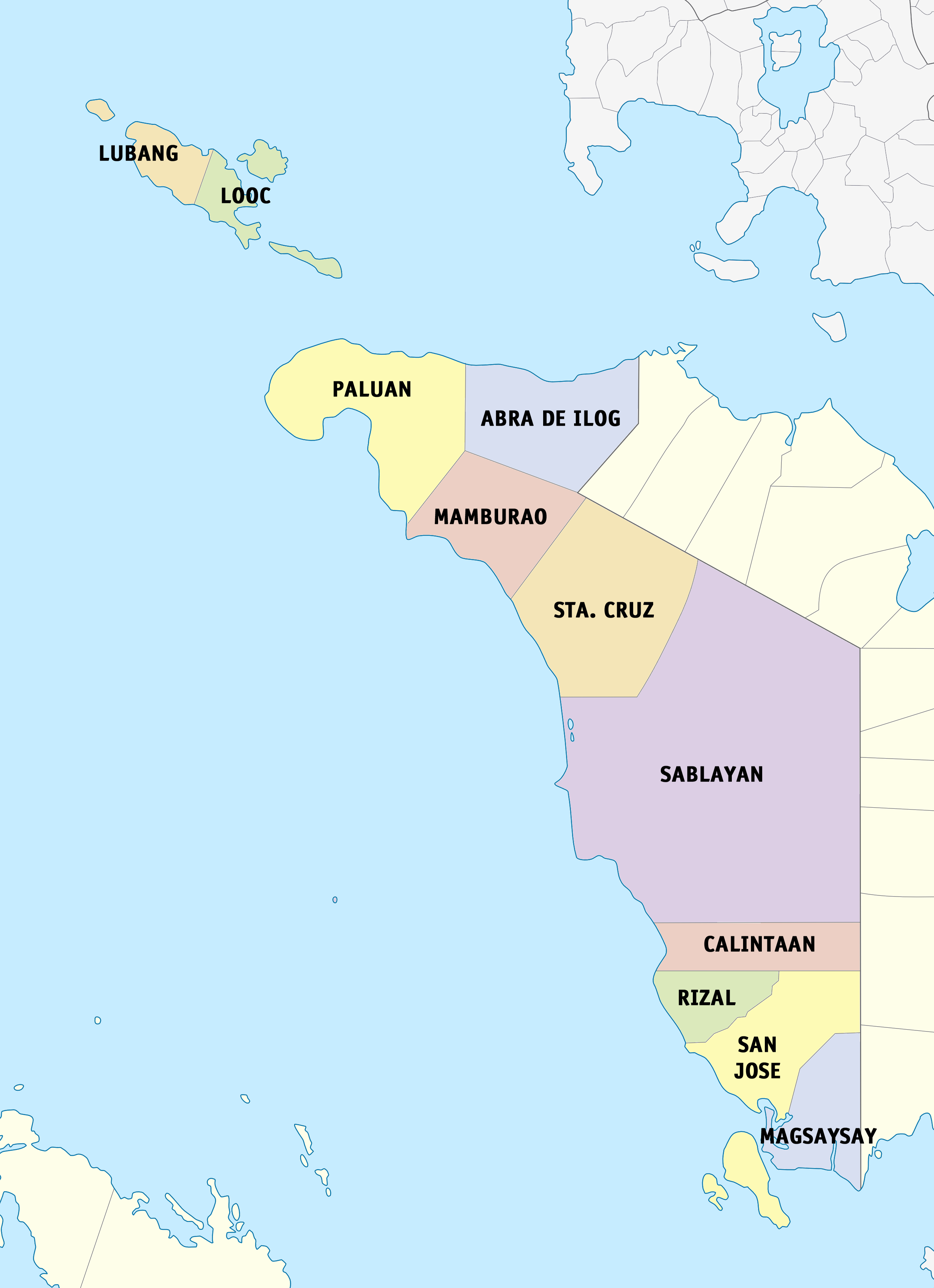
Political map of Occidental Mindoro

Occidental Mindoro comprises 11 municipalities and 2 legislative districts.

Municipality (Note: The globe icon marks the town center.)		District	Population			±% p.a.	Area		Density (2020)		Barangay
			(2020)		(2015)		km^{2}	sq mi	/km^{2}	/sq mi	
Abra de Ilog		1st	6.7%	35,176	31,306	+2.24%	533.70	206.06	66	170	10
Calintaan		2nd	5.7%	30,190	29,826	+0.23%	382.50	147.68	79	200	7
Looc		1st	1.5%	7,802	10,117	−4.83%	132.30	51.08	59	150	9
Lubang		1st	3.3%	17,437	18,803	−1.43%	113.10	43.67	150	390	16
Magsaysay		2nd	7.6%	39,767	36,016	+1.90%	296.70	114.56	130	340	12
Mamburao	†	1st	9.1%	47,705	42,975	+2.01%	283.51	109.46	170	440	15
Paluan		1st	3.5%	18,566	16,025	+2.84%	564.50	217.95	33	85	12
Rizal		2nd	7.7%	40,429	38,263	+1.05%	242.50	93.63	170	440	11
Sablayan		1st	17.6%	92,598	83,169	+2.07%	2,188.80	845.10	42	110	22
San Jose		2nd	29.2%	153,267	143,430	+1.27%	446.70	172.47	340	880	39
Santa Cruz		1st	8.1%	42,417	37,484	+2.38%	681.40	263.09	62	160	11
Total				525,354	487,414	+1.44%	5,865.71	2,264.76	90	230	164
		† Provincial capital					Municipality				

== Demographics ==
Population census of Occidental Mindoro
Year	Pop.	±% p.a.
1903	13,223	—
1918	28,193	+5.18%
1939	39,039	+1.56%
1948	43,149	+1.12%
1960	84,316	+5.74%
1970	144,032	+5.49%
1975	185,787	+5.24%
1980	222,431	+3.66%
1990	282,593	+2.42%
1995	339,605	+3.50%
2000	380,250	+2.45%
2007	421,952	+1.45%
2010	452,971	+2.62%
2015	487,414	+1.41%
2020	525,354	+1.59%
2024	511,417	−0.64%
Source: Philippine Statistics Authority

The population of Occidental Mindoro in the 2024 census was 511,417 people, with a density of 87 inhabitants per square kilometre or 230 inhabitants per square mile.

The indigenous people in the province are the Mangyans (Manguianes in Spanish, Mañguianes in Old Tagalog), consisting of 7 distinct tribes. They occupy the foothills and interior. The Mangyan have inhabited the island since pre-history. They are believed to have originally traveled from Indonesia and settled down for good in the island.

There is much evidence, historical and geophysical, that the Mangyan tribes formerly lived near the coastlines. They were compelled, however, to move into the interior jungles of the island when the inter-island immigrants came, in order to avoid confrontations, which the peace-loving tribes wished to avoid at all costs. They also wished to avoid cultural changes and to preserve their way of life.

Today, the Mangyan number to only around 80,000 (freely moving in and out in both provinces of Oriental and Occidental Mindoro). But there is no accurate accounting of them since many still live elusively in the upper regions of the island, avoiding contact with lowlanders.

=== Languages ===
Major languages spoken are Tagalog and the Mangyan languages. Tagalog is usually spoken with Batangas dialect both due to its geographical contact with Batangas and Batangueño residents in the province, with great influences from native Mangyan and Visayan languages. Ilocano, Visayan, and Bicolano, are varyingly spoken by people who migrated from the provinces where they are spoken. Occidental Mindoro is a cultural melting pot, populated mostly by recent immigrants.

=== Religion ===
Like the Eastern half of the island, most of the population of Occidental Mindoro are of Roman Catholic conviction (82%) while minor religions are usually represented by various Christian denominations, Islam, indigenous Philippine folk religions, animism, and atheism.

== Economy ==
Poverty incidence of Occidental Mindoro (%)

Source: Philippine Statistics Authority

Occidental Mindoro is an agricultural area devoted to the production of food. Its economic base is rice production (Oryza sativa culture), a Philippine staple crop. It is the leading activity and source of seasonal employment in the province, participated in by almost 80 per cent of the population, including children.

Wetland or lowland rice is a rainy season crop, heavily dependent on water and therefore produced from July (planting season) to October (harvest season). Tobacco, onions, garlic and vegetables are grown during the dry season (November to May) since they are not water-intensive crops, and require longer photoperiodicity.

Rice, corn, onions, garlic, salt, fishes (both wild and cultured) are some of the relatively significant surpluses produced in the province in exportable quantities. Mangoes, cashew nuts, cooking bananas (saba) and some other fruits grown in upland orchards are among the other exports of Occidental Mindoro that have traditionally contributed to its income. Peanuts are also grown in some parts of the province, as well as cassava, sweet potatoes, ginger and other minor cultivars.

Forest resources include timber and minerals, among them gold, copper, silver, chrome, and non-metallic minerals such as lime for making cement, and greenstones for ornaments. Timber groups include many species of hardwoods, such as mahogany, and other types of trees in high demand for durability.

There is no large industry in the province. The government is the biggest employer, absorbing most of the off-farm labor force. The local electric cooperative, Occidental Mindoro Electric Cooperative (OMECO), is the biggest employer in the private sector, with nearly 150 regular employees. The rest of the population is engaged in private trades.

=== Problems ===
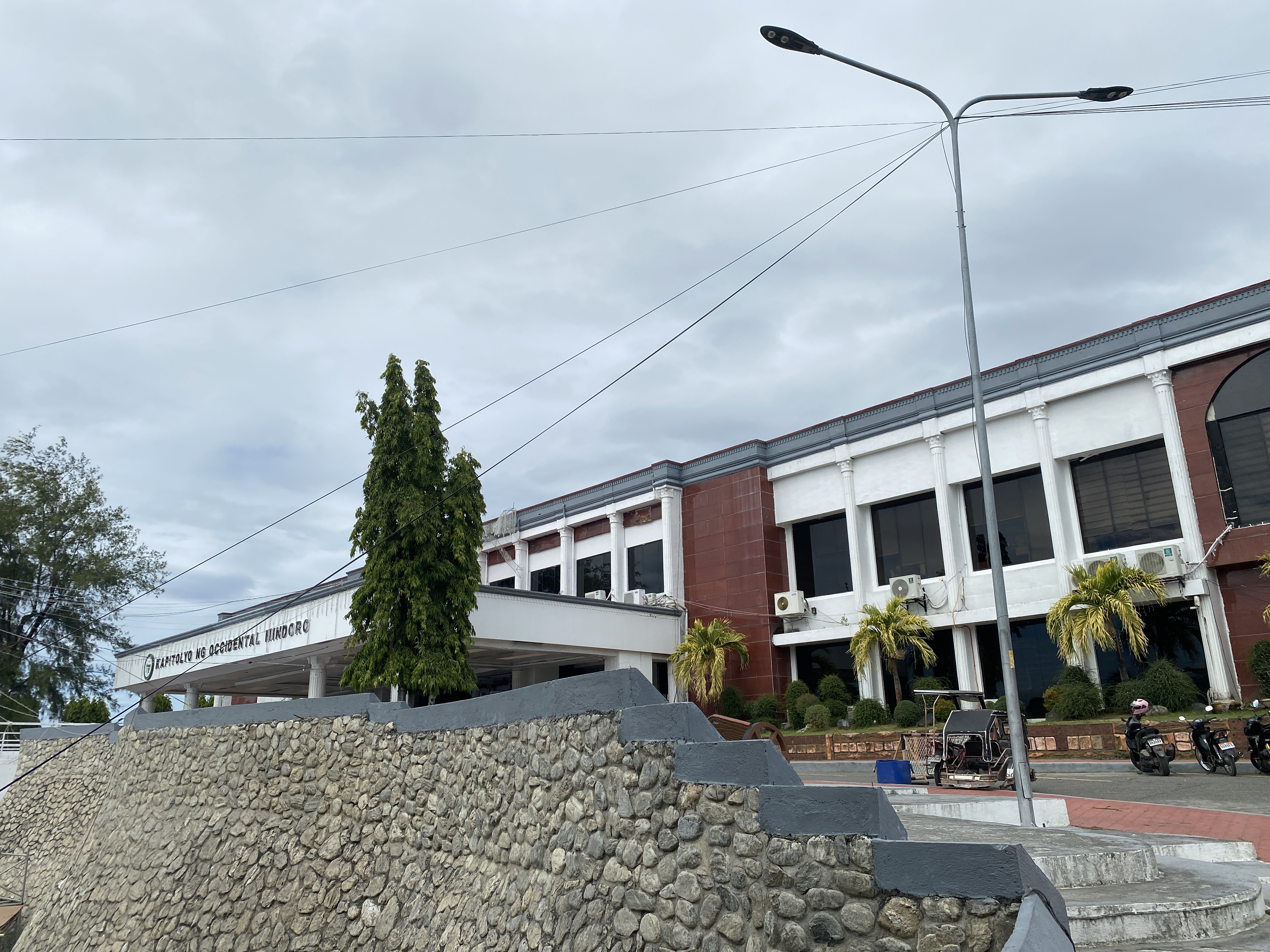
Capitol building, Mamburao.

There are many multi-faceted problems in Occidental Mindoro's economy. In rice farming, the biggest issue confronting the producers is the high cost of production. This is attributed mainly to the spiraling prices of farm inputs. A study concluded that from 1997 to 2003, the cost of production rose by 47 per cent, while the income derived from marketing rice maintained 1997 levels. There are also confused reports that the average production rate has declined due to the reduced application of necessary farm chemicals. In street language, this means that the farmers simply cut the amount of inputs because they cannot afford the high capital requirements of following all the recommended inputs in the farming calendar.

Another structural problem is the inadequacy of irrigation. Most of the river systems in the province no longer have the demanded volume of water to make irrigation feasible. This is attributed to the greatly deforested watersheds.

== Flora and fauna ==
In 2026, the municipality of Sablayan was declared a biosphere reserve by UNESCO.

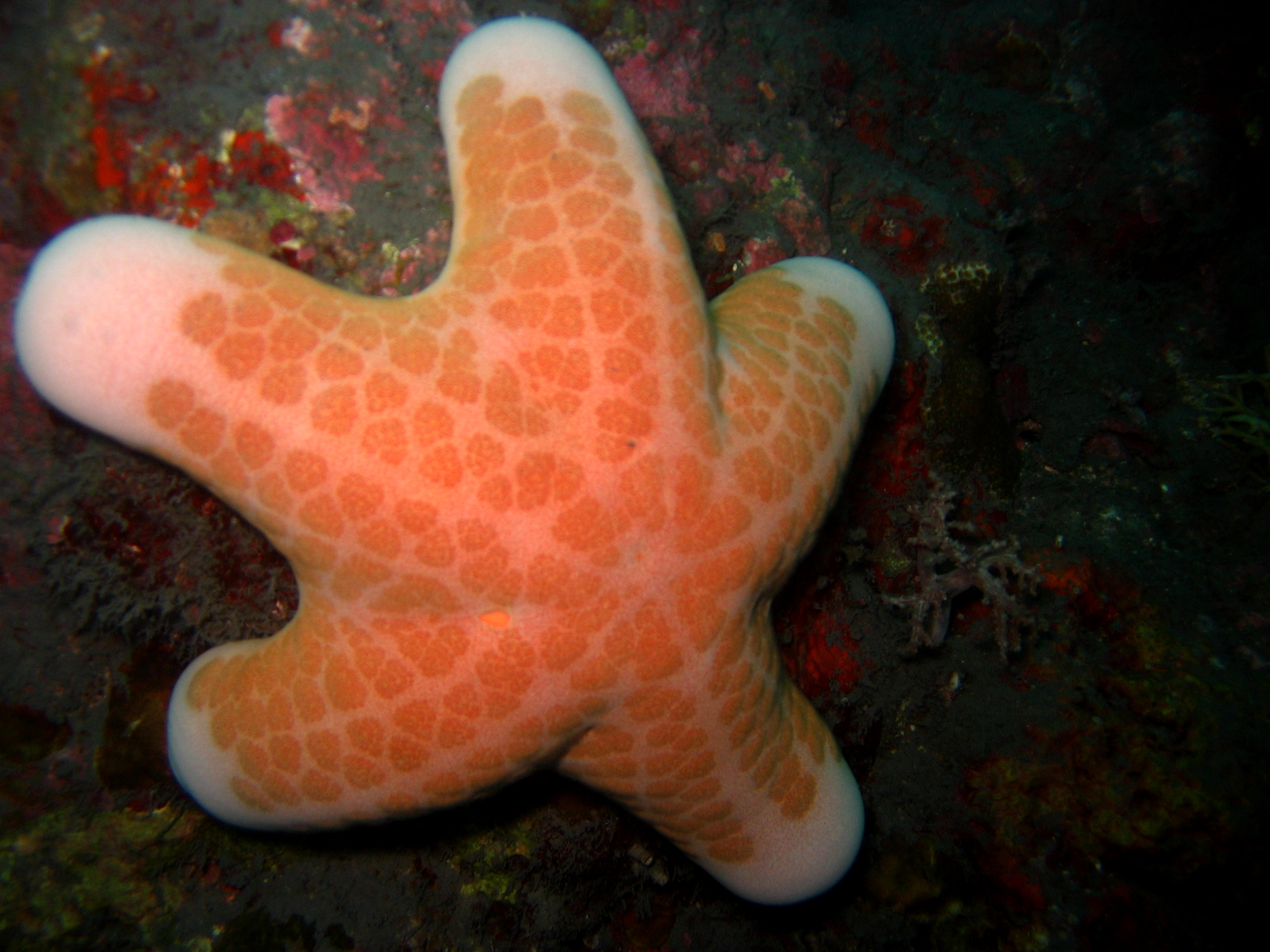
A robust red sea star (Choriaster granulatus) in Pandan Islands

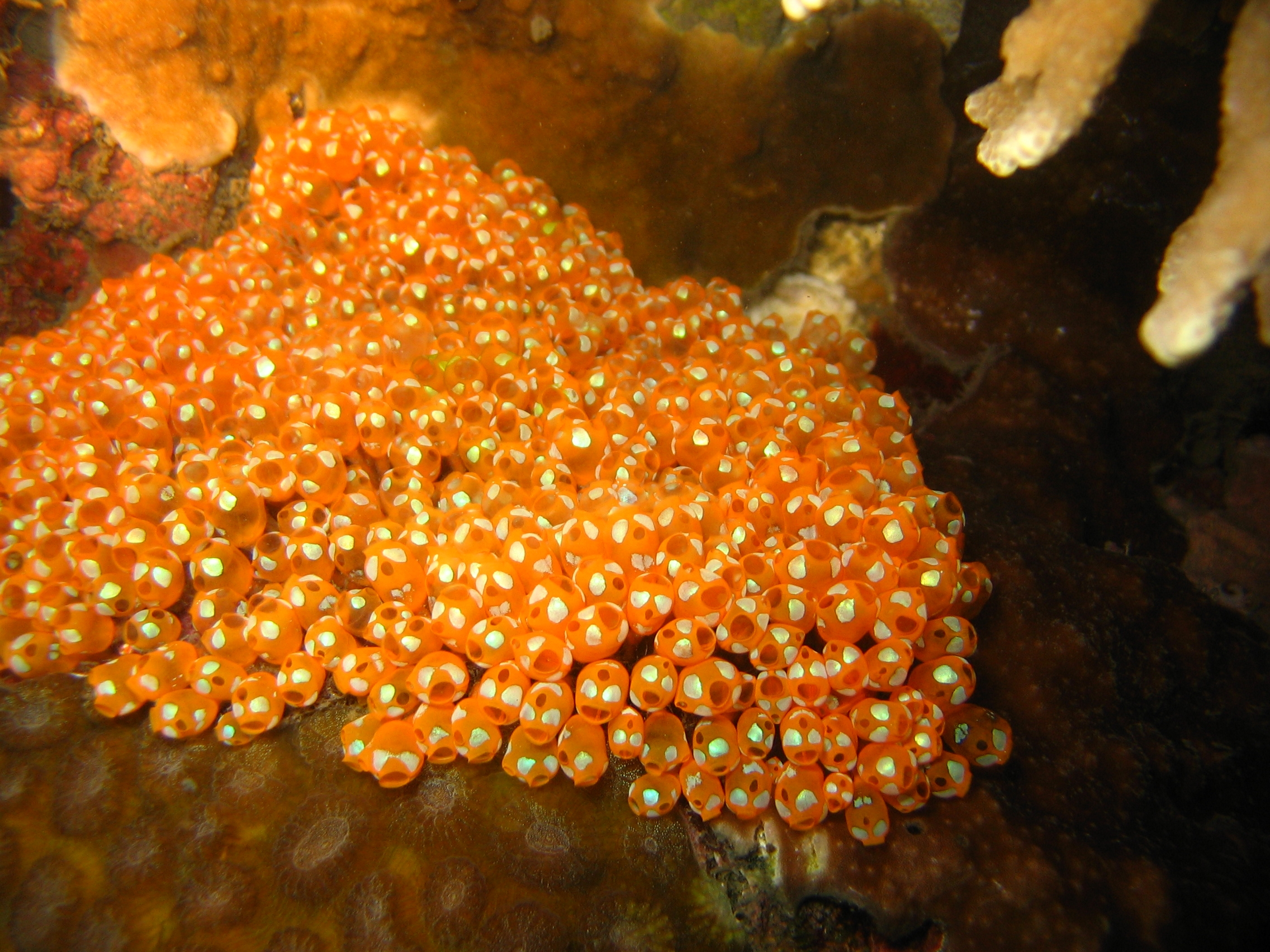
A colony of orange tunicates (Clavelina dimunata) in Pandan Islands

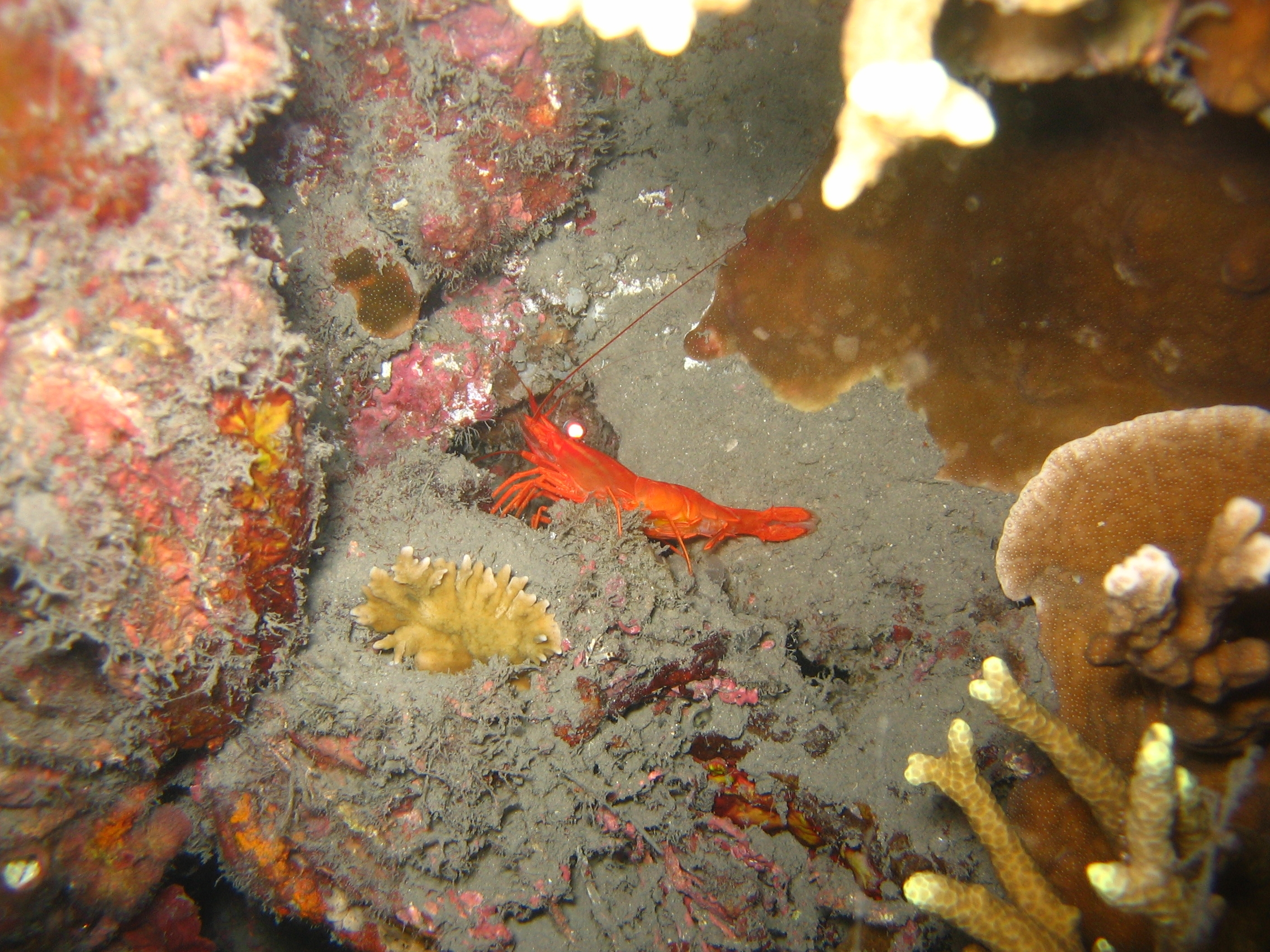
A Bright Red Shrimp in Pandan Islands.

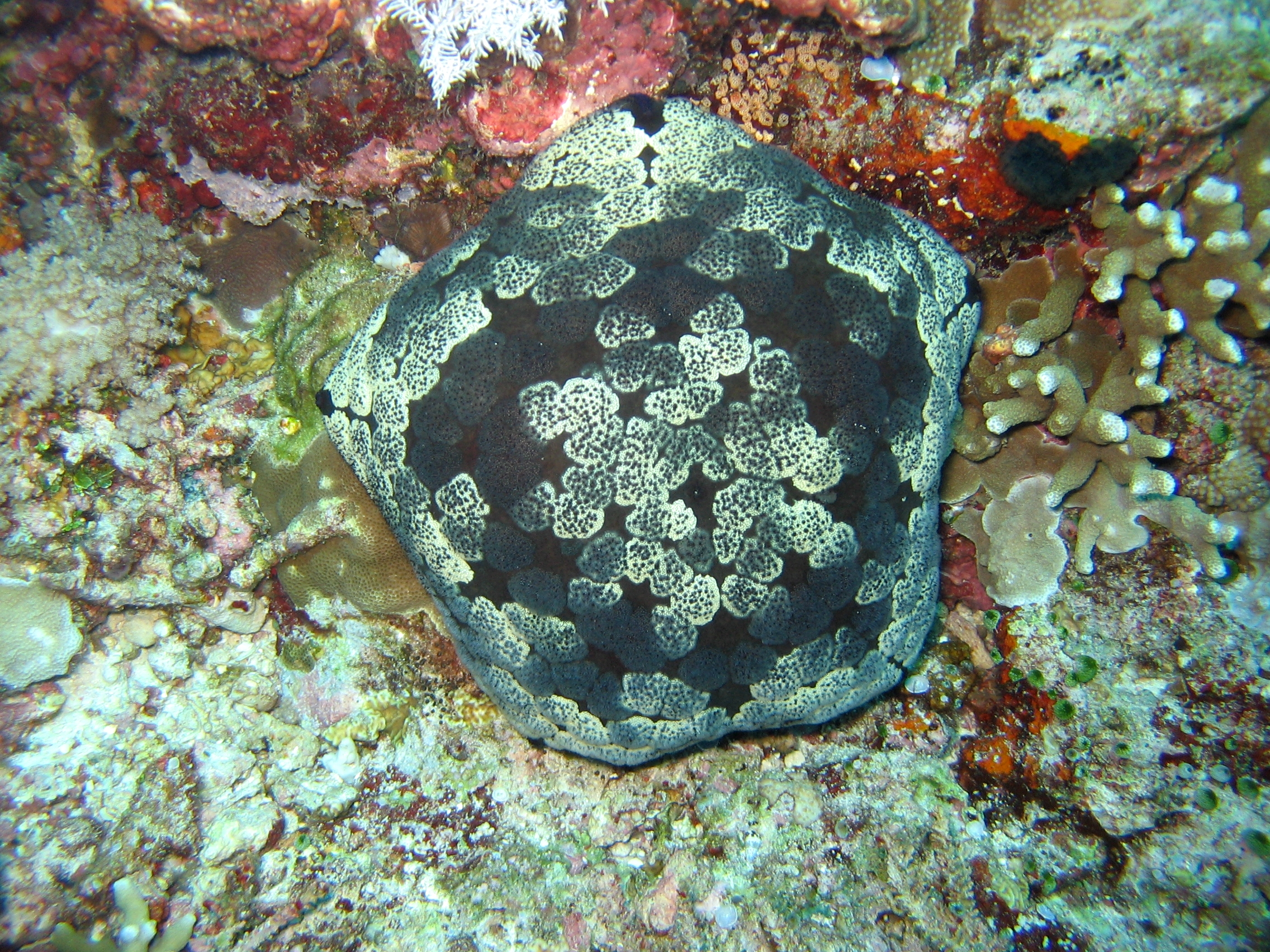
A cushion star in Apo Reef

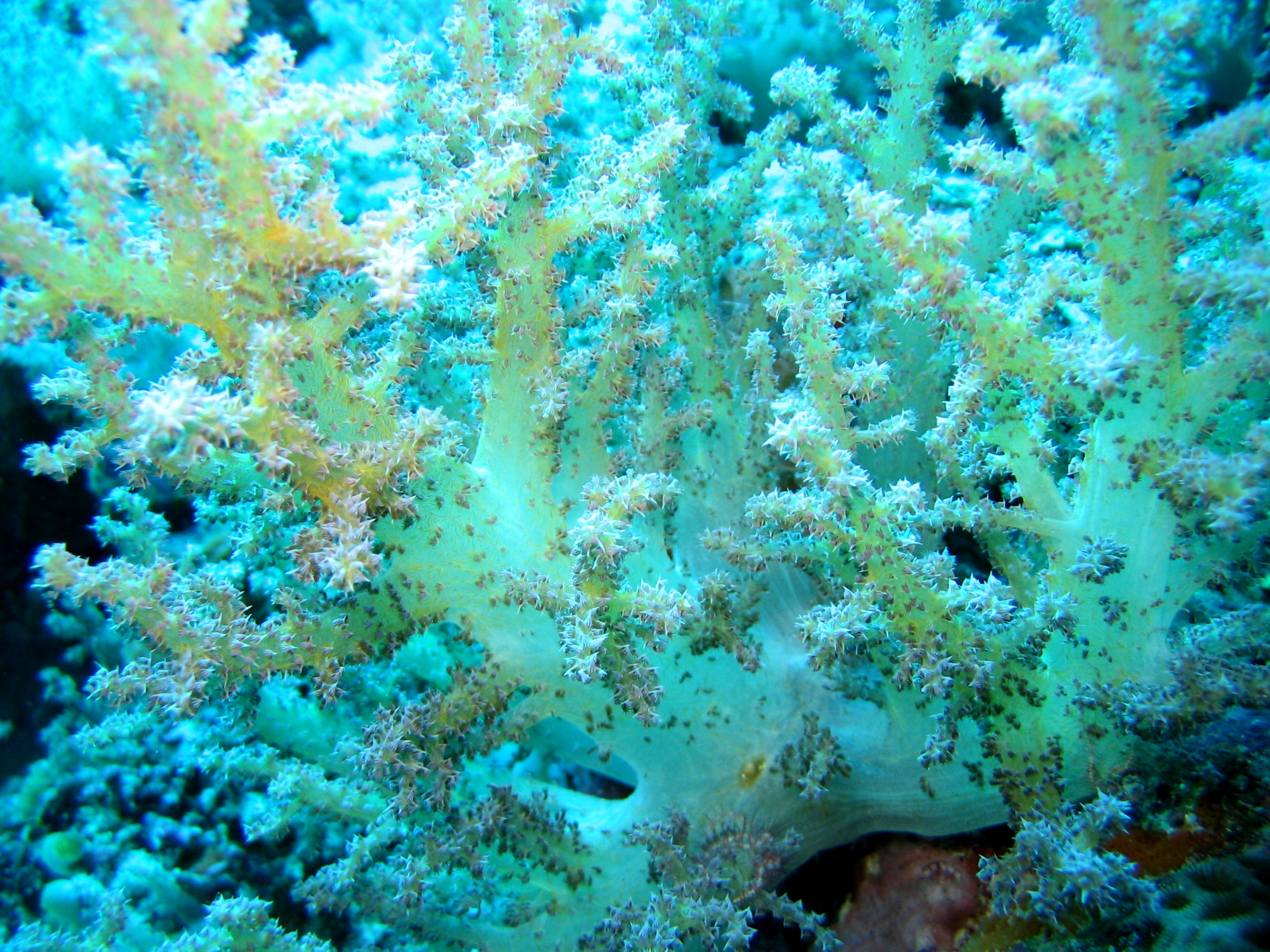
Yellowish white soft coral in Apo Reef

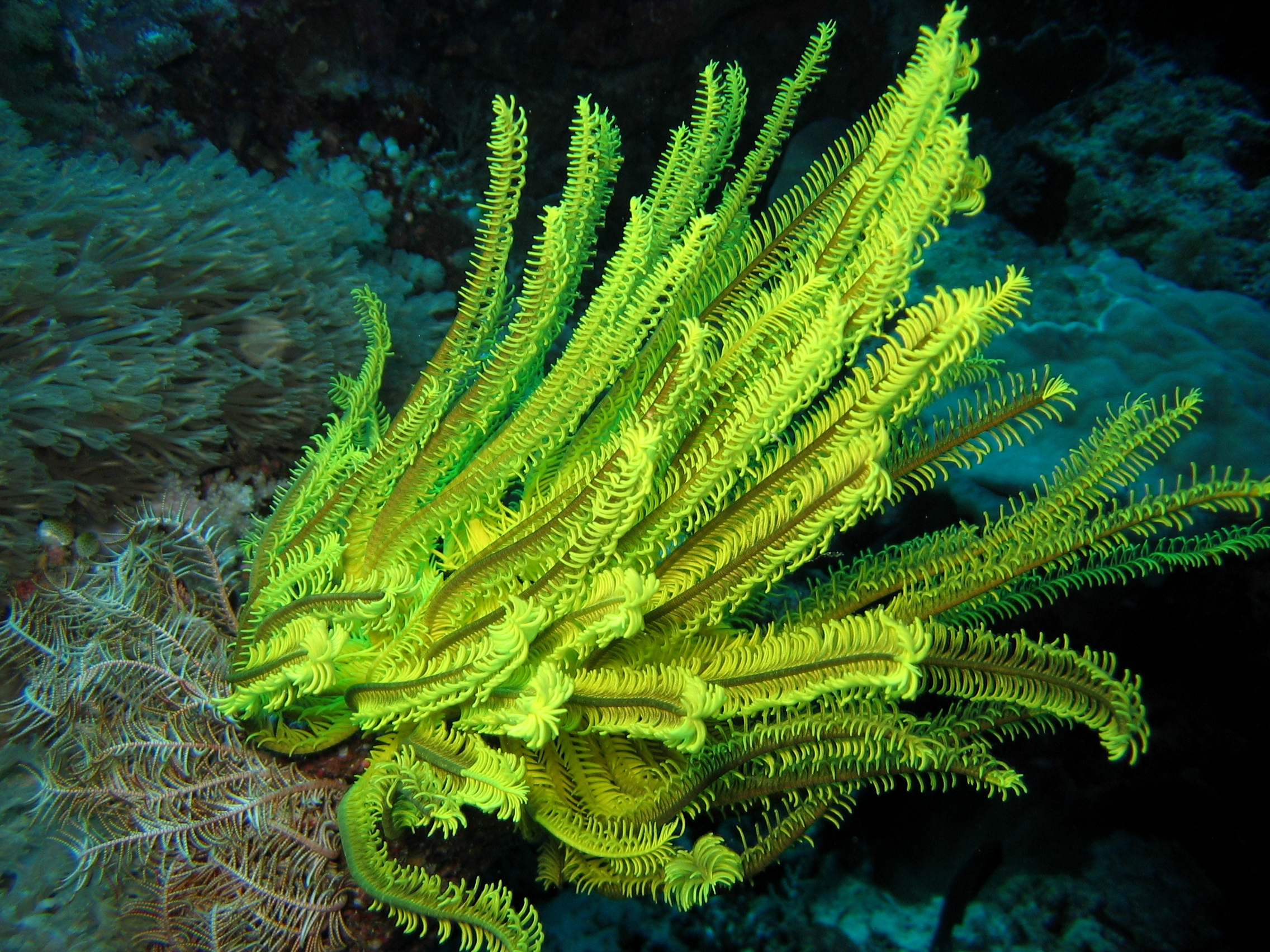
A yellow crinoid in Apo Reef

== Notable people ==
- Risa Hontiveros, senator and former Akbayan representative
- Zaijian Jaranilla, actor
- Kim Chiu, actress
